= Thésée (Lully) =

Opera by Jean-Baptiste Lully

- Opera by Jean-Baptiste Lully
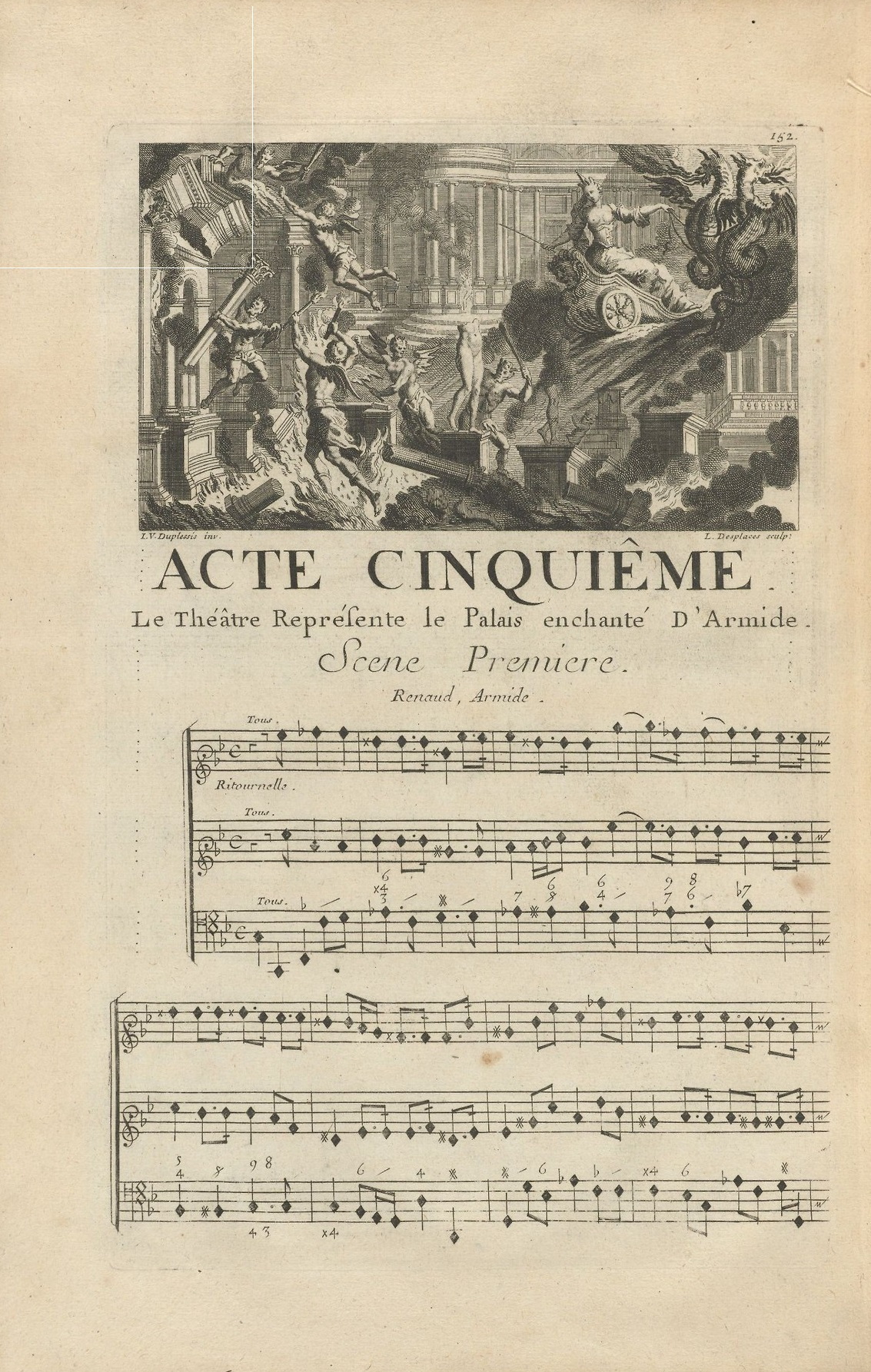
- The work's fifth act
- Librettist: Philippe Quinault
- Language: French
- Based on: Ovid's Metamorphoses
- Premiere: 11 January 1675; Saint-Germain-en-Laye

Thésée (French: [te.ze]; lit. 'Theseus') is a tragédie en musique, an early type of French opera, in a prologue and five acts with music by Jean-Baptiste Lully and a libretto by Philippe Quinault based on Ovid's Metamorphoses. It was first performed on 11 January 1675 by the Paris Opera for the royal court at the Château de Saint-Germain-en-Laye and was first performed in public in April at the Théâtre du Palais-Royal in Paris.

The plot centres around a love triangle: Aegeus wants to marry his ward, princess Aegle, while the sorceress Medea wishes to marry the young warrior Theseus, but Theseus and Aegle love each other. Medea attempts to force the lovers to renounce each other: first by using her magic to bring Aegle to a place of torment, then by convincing Aegeus to have Theseus killed as a potential threat to his reign. But before Theseus can drink the poison he has been given, Aegeus realises that Theseus is his lost son. He then gives Aegle to Theseus. Medea takes vengeance by destroying the festive setting, but the goddess Minerva undoes this.

Thésée is notable for being the earliest known piece of Western classical music to include timpani in its orchestral instrumentation.

== Roles ==
Cast	Voice type	Premiere, 11 January 1675 ( Conductor: – )
Pleasures	haute-contre, tenor	Langeais, Miracle
Un Jeu	bass	François Beaumavieille
Bacchus	haute-contre	La Grille
Venus	soprano	Beaucreux
Cérès	soprano	de La Borde
Mars	bass	Godonesche
Bellone	mute (?)	Dauphin
Églé	soprano	Marie Aubry
Cleone	soprano	Marie-Madeleine Brigogne
Arcas	bass	Antoine Morel
Grande Prêtresse de Minerve	soprano	Marie Verdier
Égée	baritone	Jean Gaye
Médée	soprano	Mlle Saint-Christophle
Dorine	soprano	Mlle Beaucreux
Thésée	tenor	Bernard Clédière
Minerve	soprano	Des Fronteaux
First old man	haute-contre	Tholet
Second old man	tenor	Miracle

== Synopsis ==
=== Prologue ===
Mars and Venus and their followers sing the praises of Louis XIV.

=== Act 1 ===
Princess Aegle is in love with Theseus and prays for his safe return from battle against rebels who are threatening King Aegeus of Athens. Aegeus enters victorious. He tells Aegle he is in love with her, despite being betrothed to the sorceress Medea. Égée says he now intends to marry Medea to his son, whom he has hidden away at Troezen and has not seen for years. The Athenians celebrate their victory with a sacrifice to the goddess Minerva.

=== Act 2 ===
Medea is in love with Theseus. She agrees to let Aegeus break off their engagement, so he can pursue Aegle. Aegeus is jealous of Theseus's popularity with the people of Athens, who want to make him the king's heir because of his bravery in battle. Medea offers to help Theseus, who reveals to her that he is in love with Aegle, provoking the sorceress to jealousy.

=== Act 3 ===
Medea threatens Aegle that she will use her magic against her if the princess does not renounce her love for Theseus and marry the king instead. She conjures up a vision of a terrifying desert full of monsters, and also menaces Aegle with demons from hell.

=== Act 4 ===
Medea orders Aegle to marry Aegeus, otherwise she will put Theseus's life in danger. She conjures a vision of the sleeping Theseus in which she threatens to sacrifice him with a knife. Theseus wakes and is perplexed by Églé's sudden coldness towards him. She explains she is trying to save his life. Theseus reveals that he is Égée's son from Troezen. Medea appears to relent and bless the betrothal of Theseus and Aegle.

=== Act 5 ===
In reality, Medea is still tortured by jealousy. She persuades Aegeus to kill Theseus, warning him that if he makes Theseus his heir, the king will wrong his missing son. Aegeus hands Theseus a poisoned chalice, but he recognises Theseus's sword and realises the young man must be his son. Just in time, he prevents Theseus from drinking the poison. He agrees to let Theseus marry Aegle. Thwarted, Medea escapes on a flying chariot pulled by dragons, burning down the palace. The Athenians pray to Minerva who raises a magnificent new palace and the opera ends with rejoicing.

== Recording ==
- Thésée, Howard Crook (Theseus), Laura Pudwell (Medea), Ellen Hargis (Aegle), Harry van der Kamp (Aegeus), Boston Early Music Festival Chorus and Orchestra, conducted by Paul O'Dette and Stephen Stubbs (CPO, 3 CDs, 2007)
- Thésée, Mathias Vidal (Theseus), Karine Deshayes (Medea), Déborah Cachet (Aegle), Philippe Estèphe (Aegeus), Les Talens Lyriques, conducted by Christophe Rousset (Aparté, 3 CDs, 2023)
