= Mlle Saint-Christophle =

French soprano (fl. 1663 – c. 1682)

- Occupation: Soprano
- Years active: 1663–1682
- Organizations: court of King Louis XIV; Académie Royale de Musique

Mlle Saint-Christophle, sometimes spelled Mlle Saint-Christophe (fl. 1663 – c. 1682), was a French soprano who flourished during the 17th century. As early as 1663 she was a musician in the court of King Louis XIV. She is particularly associated with composer Jean-Baptiste Lully, performing in the world premieres of several of his operas staged between 1674 and 1682. Her career as a musician ended when she entered a convent voluntarily in 1682.

== Biography ==
Mlle Saint-Christophle, a French soprano, worked as a musique du roi (English: Musician of the King) in the court of Louis XIV, and as early as 8 January 1663 was listed as a "musicienne de Sa Majesté" (English: "His Majesty's musician") when she sang in Lully’s Ballet des arts. She was described by one of her contemporaries as a "grande, bien faite, belle et vertueuse" (English: "tall, well-formed, beautiful, and virtuous") woman. According to University of Nottingham music professor Philip Weller, she was described in a period source as having a "nobility and taste in deportment, gesture and action, in addition to great beauty of voice."

Saint-Christophle was one of Lully's favored singers while he was creating his early tragédie en musique. She created the title role in the world premiere of his Alceste on 19 January 1674 with the Académie Royale de Musique. It was the first opera created by Lully that was staged at the Théâtre du Palais-Royal in Paris. On 10 January 1676 she performed the role of the goddess Cybèle in the premiere of Lully's Atys at the Château de Saint-Germain-en-Laye. She portrayed the mother of Proserpine, Cérès (Ceres), in Lully's Proserpine (1680) in which she was given four solo scenes.

Other original operas by Lully that Saint-Christophle starred in included Thésée (1675, as Médée), Isis (1677, as Juno), Psyché (1678, most likely as Venus), (Note: Grove Music Online states she played the Queen in this opera. However, there is no queen character in the opera. Banducci proposes that she played Venus, but this is not for certain.) Bellérophon (1679, as Sténobée), and Persée (1682, as Cassiope). She also portrayed the role of the Night in Lully's ballet Le triomphe de l’amour (1681). According to musicologist Antonia Banducci it is possible, but not certain, that she portrayed Climène in the premiere of Lully's Phaëton (1683). Banducci lists the role of Climène as a potential part played by Saint-Christophle in the premiere of the opera in her table of role premieres in Lully operas. However, the scholar acknowledges that other sources say Saint-Christophle retired earlier, and that it may be the role was only crafted with her in mind.

Multiple sources state Saint-Christophle's career ended when she voluntarily entered a convent in 1682. It is unknown exactly when she died after this.

== Notes and references ==
=== Bibliography ===
- Sadie, Stanley; Macy, Laura, eds. (1996). The New Grove Book of Operas, Second Edition. Oxford University Press. ISBN 978-0195309072.
- Somerset-Ward, Richard (2004). Angels and Monsters: Male and Female Sopranos in the Story of Opera, 1600–1900. Yale University Press. ISBN 9780300099683.
