= Proserpine (Lully) =

Opera by Jean-Baptiste Lully

- Opera by Jean-Baptiste Lully
- Title page of the score
- Librettist: Philippe Quinault
- Language: French
- Premiere: 3 February 1680; Saint-Germain-en-Laye

Proserpine (Proserpina) is an opera with music by Jean-Baptiste Lully and a libretto by Philippe Quinault first performed at Saint-Germain-en-Laye on 3 February 1680.

== Roles ==
Roles, voice types, premiere cast
Role	Voice type	Premiere cast, 3 February 1680
Prologue
La Paix (Peace)	soprano	Catherine Ferdinand
La Félicité (Felicitas)	soprano	Mlle Rebel
L'Abondance (Abundantia)	soprano	Mlle Puvigné (or Puvigny)
La Discorde (Discord)	tenor (en travesti)	Puvigné (or Puvigny)
La Victoire (Victoria)	soprano	Claude Ferdinand
Tragédie
Pluton (Pluto)	bass	Jean Gaye
Ascalaphe (Ascalaphus), son of Acheron, confidant of Pluton	bass	Antoine Morel
Proserpine	soprano	Claude Ferdinand
Cérès (Ceres)	soprano	Mlle Saint-Christophle
Jupiter	bass	Godonesche
Alphée (Alpheus)	haute-contre	Bernard Cledière
Aréthuse (Arethusa)	soprano	Catherine Ferdinand
Mercure (Mercury)	tenor	Langeais
Cyané, a Sicilian nymph, confidante of Cérès	soprano	Mlle Bony
Crinise, god of the Sicilian river Crinisus	basse-taille	Arnoul
Furies	2 tenors and a basse-taille(?)	Claude Desvoyes, Puvigny (or Puvigné) and Le Maire
A blessed spirit	soprano	

== Synopsis ==
Based on Ovid's Metamorphoses, the plot centers around the abduction of Proserpine by Pluton, with side plots concerning Cérès's love for Jupiter and the love intrigue between Alphée and Aréthuse.

== Recordings ==
- soloists, Le Concert Spirituel, conducted by Hervé Niquet (Glossa, 2 CDs, 2008)
- soloists, Les Talens Lyriques, cond. Christophe Rousset (Chateau de Versailles label, 2025)
