= Marie Aubry =

French operatic soprano

Marie Aubry (c. 1656 – 1704) was a French operatic soprano of the Baroque period.

== Life and career ==
Marie Aubry was born in France in c. 1656. She was the daughter of Léonard Aubry and Geneviève Béjart, sister of French actress Madeleine Béjart. While in the service of the Philippe I, Duke of Orléans's private music troupe, she was recruited by Pierre Perrin and Robert Cambert of the Académie Royale de Musique and became first soprano in the troupe of Jean-Baptiste Lully, creating for him roles in the following operas: Oriane in Amadis de Gaule, Sangaride in Atys, Philonoé in Bellérophon, Io in Isis, Andromède in Persée, and the title role in Proserpine, Églé in Thésée.

She and her brother Sébastien were supposedly implicated in the so-called assassination attempt of Lully by her lover Henri Guichard in 1675. A subsequent trial lasted for a three year period.

Described as small, with white skin and black hair, she retired from the stage in 1684, because of obesity such that she could no longer walk.
