= Louise-Anastasia Serment =

French natural philosopher and poet

Louise-Anastasia Serment (1642 in Grenoble, Dauphiné – 1692 in Paris) was a French natural philosopher and poet. Born in Grenoble, she spent most of her life in Paris. She was a disciple of Descartes. She was a member of the Ricovrati Academy. Serment reputedly collaborated as an author with Philippe Quinault in his operas.

== Sources ==
- Renate Strohmeier: Lexikon der Naturwissenschaftlerinnen und naturkundigen Frauen Europas, 1998
- Jane Stevenson: Women Latin Poets: Language, Gender, and Authority, from Antiquity to the Eighteenth century, 2005
