= Les Talens Lyriques =

French musical ensemble created in 1991

The French musical ensemble Les Talens Lyriques was created in 1991 in Paris, France, by the harpsichordist and orchestral conductor Christophe Rousset. This instrumental and vocal formation derives its name from the subtitle of Les fêtes d'Hébé (1739) an opera by Jean-Philippe Rameau.

== Description ==
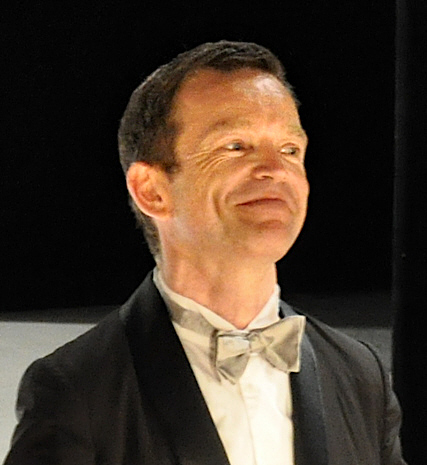
Christophe Rousset, founder of the ensemble, in 2012

The repertoire of Les Talens Lyriques extends from Monteverdi (L'incoronazione di Poppea, Il ritorno d'Ulisse in patria and L'Orfeo), Francesco Cavalli (La Didone and La Calisto) to Handel (Scipione, Riccardo Primo, Rinaldo, Admeto, Giulio Cesare, Serse, Arianna, Tamerlano, Ariodante, Semele and Alcina), taking in on the way Jean-Baptiste Lully (Persée, Roland, Bellérophon, Phaéton, Isis, Amadis and Armide), Henri Desmarets (Vénus et Adonis), Jean-Joseph Cassanéa de Mondonville (Les fêtes de Paphos), Cimarosa (Il Mercato di Malmantile, Il matrimonio segreto), Tommaso Traetta (Antigona and Ippolito ed Aricia), Jommelli (Armida abbandonata), Martin y Soler (La capricciosa corretta, Il Tutore burlato), Mozart (Mitridate, Die Entführung aus dem Serail and Cosi fan tutte), Salieri (La grotta di Trofonio, Les Danaïdes), Rameau (Zoroastre, Castor et Pollux, Les Indes galantes and Platée), Gluck (Bauci e Filemone) and Beethoven, and not forgetting Cherubini (Médée), García (Il Califfo di Bagdad), Berlioz, Massenet and Saint-Saëns.

The revival of such scores has gone hand in hand with close collaboration with stage directors and choreographers such as Pierre Audi, Jean-Marie Villégier, David McVicar, Éric Vigner, Ludovic Lagarde, Mariame Clément, Jean-Pierre Vincent, Macha Makeïeff, Laura Scozzi, Marcial di Fonzo Bo, Claus Guth, Robert Carsen, and David Hermann.

In addition to the lyrical repertoire, the ensemble also explores other musical genres such as the madrigal, cantata, air de cour, symphony, and the vast repertoire of sacred music (masses, motets, oratorios, leçons de Ténèbres and much else), leading Les Talens Lyriques to perform everywhere in the world with forces varying from a handful of musicians to over sixty from all generations.

The discography of Les Talens Lyriques comprises around seventy titles on numerous labels: Erato, Fnac Music, Auvidis, Decca, Naïve, Ambroisie, Virgin Classics, Aparté and Outhere. The ensemble is also responsible for the much-acclaimed soundtrack of the film Farinelli (1994).

Since 2007 Les Talens Lyriques have been devoting some of their time to introducing secondary school pupils to the world of music with a programme of workshops and teaching residencies, leading a practical orchestral class and, from 2014, developing new and innovative technological resources designed to help young people discover and appreciate the Baroque repertoire.

The ensemble receives subsidies from the French Ministry of Culture and the City of Paris, and generous support from its Circle of Patrons.

Since 2011 Les Talens Lyriques have been associate artists, in residence at the Singer-Polignac Foundation in Paris. Les Talens Lyriques are founding members of FEVIS and PROFEDIM.

== Recordings ==
Les Talens Lyriques has recorded the following works:

=== Operas ===
- Luigi Cherubini, Médée, 2012 - DVD BelAir Classiques
- Antoine Dauvergne, Hercule Mourant, 2012 - Aparté
- Henri Desmarets, Vénus & Adonis, 2007 - Ambroisie-Naïve
- Manuel Garcia, Il Califfo di bagdad, 2007 - Archiv Produktion
- Christoph Willibald Gluck, Philémon & Baucis, 2006 - Naïve-Ambroisie-Astrée
- Charles Gounod, Faust, 2019 – Palazzetto Bru Zane
- Georg Friedrich Haendel, Scipione, 1993 / 2010 - Aparté
- Georg Friedrich Haendel, Riccardo Primo, re d’Inghilterra, 1996 - Decca
- Georg Friedrich Haendel, Serse, 2005 - TDK
- Niccolo Jommelli, Armida abbandonata, 2005 - Ambroisie
- Stefano Landi, La morte d'Orfeo, 2020 - DVD Naxos
- Jean-Baptiste Lully, Persée, 2001 - Astrée / Naïve
- Jean-Baptiste Lully, Roland, 2004 - Ambroisie
- Jean-Baptiste Lully, Bellérophon, 2011 - Aparté
- Jean-Baptiste Lully, Phaéton (opéra), 2013 - Aparté
- Jean-Baptiste Lully, Amadis (opéra), 2014 - Aparté
- Jean-Baptiste Lully, Armide (opéra), 2015 - Aparté
- Jean-Baptiste Lully, Alceste (opéra), 2017 - Aparté
- Jean-Baptiste Lully, Isis (opéra), 2019 - Aparté
- Jean-Baptiste Lully, Psyché (opera), 2023 - Château de Versailles Spectacles
- Vicente Martin y Soler, La capricciosa corretta, 2004 - Naive Astrée
- Vicente Martin y Soler, Il Tutore Burlato, 2007 - L’Oiseau-Lyre
- Etienne-Nicolas Méhul, Uthal, 2016 - CD Palazzetto Bru Zane
- Jean-Joseph Cassanéa de Mondonville, Les fêtes de Paphos, 1997 - Decca
- Claudio Monteverdi, L’Incoronazione di Poppea, 2005 - DVD BBC / Opus Arte
- Wolfgang Amadeus Mozart, Mitridate, rè di Ponto, 1999 - Decca
- Jean-Philippe Rameau, Zoroastre, 2007 - DVD Opus Arte
- Jean-Philippe Rameau, Castor & Pollux, 2008 - DVD Opus Arte
- Jean-Philippe Rameau, Zaïs, 2015-CD Aparté
- Jean-Philippe Rameau, Pygmalion, 2017-CD Aparté
- Antonio Salieri, La grotta di Trofonio, 2005 - CD/DVD Ambroisie
- Antonio Sacchini, Renaud, 2013 - Palazzetto Bru Zane
- Antonio Salieri, Les Danaïdes, 2015 - CD Palazzetto Bru Zane
- Antonio Salieri, Les Horaces, 2018 - CD Aparté
- Antonio Salieri, Tarare, 2019 - CD Aparté
- Antonio Salieri, Armida, 2021 - CD Aparté
- Tommaso Traetta, Antigona, 2000 - Decca

=== Vocal ===
- Pascal Collasse, Cantiques spirituels de Jean Racine, 1993 - Fnac Music
- François Couperin, Motets, 1993 - Fnac Music
- François Couperin, Leçons de ténèbres, Motets, Magnificat, 2000 - Decca
- François Couperin, Couperin et moi, 2018 - Aparté
- Daniel Danielis, Motets, 1993 - Koch Schwann
- Daniel Danielis, Motets d’Uppsala, 1997 - Cyprès
- Henri Dumont, Motets en dialogue, 1992 - Virgin
- Handel/Sandrine Piau, Opera seria, 2004 - Naïve
- Handel/Opera Arias Joyce DiDonato, Furore, 2008 - Virgin Classics
- Leonardo Leo, Miserere - Musique sacrée, 2002 - Decca
- Wolfgang Amadeus Mozart, Airs sacrés/Sandrine Piau, 2006 - DVD Armide classics
- Wolfgang Amadeus Mozart, Betulia liberata, 2019 - Aparté
- Giovanni Battista Pergolesi, Stabat Mater - Salve Regina, 1999 - Decca
- Giovanni Battista Pergolesi, Stabat Mater, 2020 - Outhere
- Henry Purcell, Harmonia Sacra/Rosemary Josha, 2010 - Aparté
- De Lully à Gluck, Tragédiennes 1/Véronique Gens, 2006 - Virgin
- De Gluck à Berlioz, Tragédiennes 2/Véronique Gens, 2009 - Virgin Classics
- Méhul, Rodolphe Kreutzer, Salieri, Gluck, Gossec, Meyerbeer, Auguste Mermet, Berlioz, Saint-Saëns, Massenet, Verdi, Tragédiennes 3 Héroïnes romantiques/Véronique Gens”, 2011 - Virgin Classics
- Lully, Rameau, Gluck, Desmarest, Les grandes eaux musicales de Versailles, 2008 - CD Ambroisie
- Jean-Baptiste Lully, Ballet royal de la Naissance de Vénus, 2021 - Aparté
- Handel, Ricardo Broschi, Porpora, Johann Adolph Hasse, Pergolesi, Farinelli, Il castrato, 1994 - Naïve-Auvidis
- Handel, Ricardo Broschi, Giacomelli, Porpora, Johann Adolph Hasse, Leonardo Leo, Farinelli - A portrait, live in Bergen/Ann Hallenberg, 2016- Aparté
- Mozart, Haydn, Soler, Cimarosa, Salieri, Gazzaniga, Sarti/Roberto Scaltriti, Amadeus & Vienna, 1998 - Decca
- José de Nebra, de Hita, Martin y Soler/Maria Bayo, Arias de Zarzuela barroca, 2003 - Naïve
- Niccolo Jommelli, Mozart, Gluck, Myslivecek/Teodora Gheorghiu, Arias for Anna de Amicis, 2010 - Aparté

=== Instrumental ===
- Johann Sebastian Bach, Sonates pour violon et clavecin, 2006 - Ambroisie
- Johann Sebastian Bach, Wilhelm Friedemann Bach, Carl Philipp Emanuel Bach, Johann Christian Bach, The Bach Dynasty, 2007 - Naïve-Ambroisie
- François Couperin, Les goûts réunis, 2001 - Decca
- François Couperin, Les Nations, 2018 - Aparté
- François Couperin, Couperin et moi, 2018 - Aparté
- François Couperin, Concerts Royaux, 2018 - Aparté
- Jean-Marie Leclair, Ouvertures et sonates en trio, 1993 - Fnac Music
- Jean-Joseph Cassanéa de Mondonville, Pièces de clavecin avec violon, 1997 - Verany
- Henry Purcell, Songs from Orpheus Britannicus/A. Mellon, W. Kuijken, 1993 - Astrée
- Jean-Philippe Rameau, Ouvertures, 1997 - Decca
- Jean-Philippe Rameau, Six concerts en sextuor, 2003 - Decca
- Georg Philipp Telemann, Quatuors Parisiens, 1993 - Denon
- Lully, Campra, Marin Marais, André Cardinal Destouches, Jacques Cordier, Musiques à danser à la cour et à l’opéra, 1995 - Erato
