= La capricciosa corretta =

Opera by Vicente Martín y Soler

- Opera by Vicente Martín y Soler
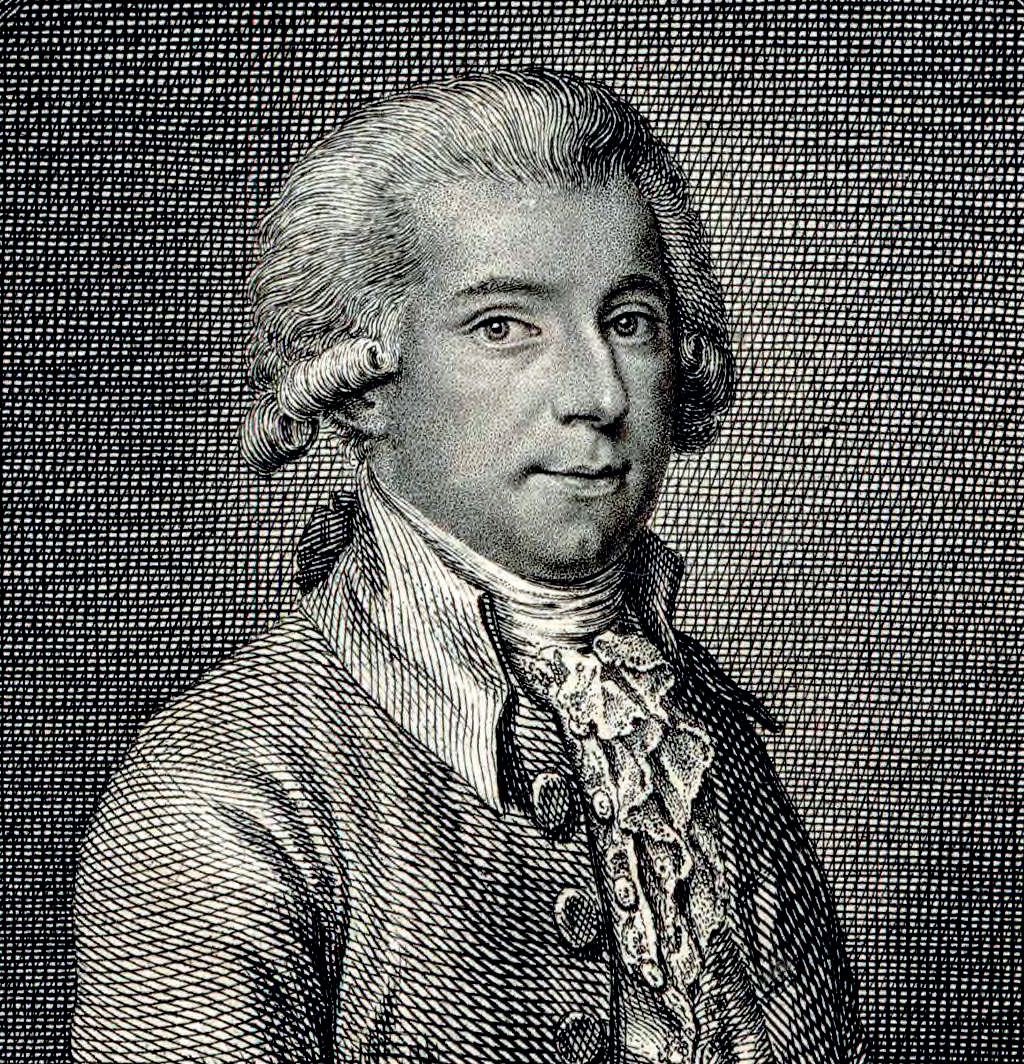
- Vicente Martín y Soler
- Librettist: Lorenzo Da Ponte
- Premiere: 27 January 1795; King's Theatre, London

La capricciosa corretta (The capricious woman reformed) is a comic opera (commedia per musica) in two acts composed by Vicente Martín y Soler. The libretto by Lorenzo Da Ponte is based on the comedy La moglie in calzoni from 1728 by Jacopo Angelo Nelli. The story takes place over a 24-hour period and examines the marriage of an older man to his vain and capricious second wife whose antics make her husband, stepchildren, and servants miserable until she is finally brought to heel through the machinations of her husband's major domo. The opera premiered under the title La scuola dei maritati (The school for spouses) at the King's Theatre in London on 27 January 1795 to considerable success. It was later performed throughout Europe under the alternative titles Gli sposi in contrasto, La moglie corretta, and La capricciosa corretta—the title used by Da Ponte and the one by which it is known today.

== Background ==
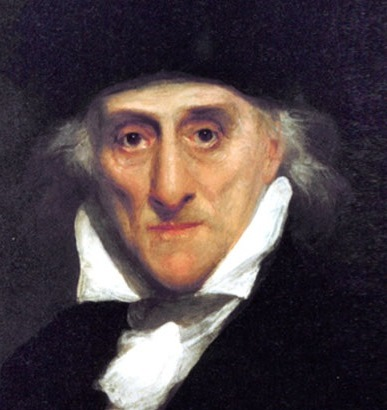
Lorenzo Da Ponte in old age (detail from a portrait attributed to Samuel Morse)

La capricciosa corretta was the fourth of Martín y Soler's five collaborations with Lorenzo Da Ponte. The first three—Il burbero di buon cuore (1786), Una cosa rara (1786), and L'arbore di Diana (1787)—were premiered at the Burgtheater in Vienna, where Da Ponte had been the poet to the imperial theatres of Emperor Joseph II since 1783. After the death of Joseph II in 1790 Da Ponte fell into disfavour, feuded with Salieri, and was replaced as the poet of the Habsburg court theatres. On the advice of Casanova, he moved to London in 1792 and offered his services to the King's Theatre. William Taylor, the theatre's proprietor at the time, initially refused the offer, but in 1793 invited Da Ponte back to London as his advisor and suggested that he also summon Martín y Soler from Russia to collaborate with him on a new opera for the theatre. (Note: In the interim, Da Ponte had been in Holland, where he made an unsuccessful attempt to establish an Italian opera company.) This was to be La capricciosa corretta. According to Da Ponte, he completed the libretto in three weeks and handed it over to Martín y Soler who was living in Da Ponte's house while he composed the music.

Like The Marriage of Figaro, the action takes place over a 24-hour period, involves a domineering spouse, and ultimately results in a marriage saved through the servants' machinations. Like Così fan tutte, the story is set in a villa in Naples and involves a woman being brought "down to earth" by an oriental impostor (in the case of La capricciosa, a servant in disguise). When adapting Nelli's comedy, Da Ponte retained the names Ciprigna, Bonario, Valerio and Fiuta from the original. The characters Clarice, Buonamico and Vespina were renamed Isabella, Lelio and Cilia, respectively. The name of the capricious woman of the title, Ciprigna, is a double word play on "La Ciprigna" (an Italian epithet for Venus) and the word "inciprignire" meaning "to become angry and embittered", while her hapless husband's name, Bonario, evokes goodness. The name of Bonario's confidante and major domo, Fiuta, alludes to "fiutare" meaning "to flatter". The names of the opera's young lovers, Valerio, Isabella, and Lelio, are the standard ones for such characters in commedia dell'arte plays. Captain Sbaraglia is likewise a commedia dell'arte character whose name derives from "sbaraglio" meaning "disorder or confusion".

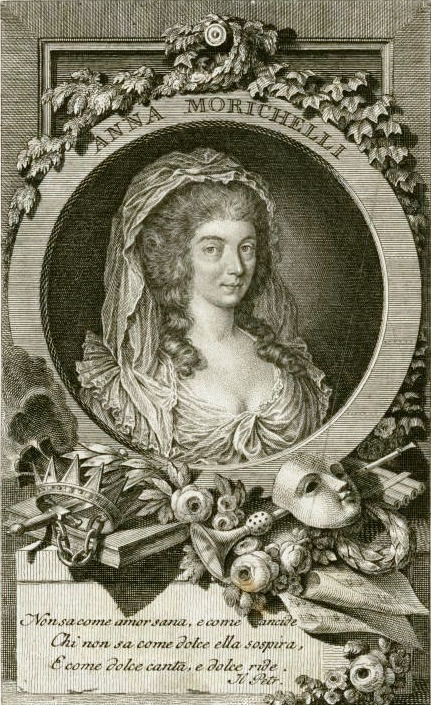
Anna Morichelli who created the role of Ciprigna, the "capricious woman" of the opera's title

The success of La capricciosa led to another joint commission from the King's Theatre—L'isola del piacere which premiered four months later. However, Martín y Soler and Da Ponte had a serious falling out midway through the writing process. According to Da Ponte, while living in his house Martín y Soler had made Da Ponte's servant girl pregnant and then spread rumours that Da Ponte was the father. Martín y Soler then moved in with Anna Morichelli who had created the role of Ciprigna and was to sing the lead in L'isola del piacere. The opera was a failure and ran for only four performances. Da Ponte blamed both Martín y Soler and Morichelli for the failure. Martín y Soler returned to Russia at the end of the season and never again collaborated with Da Ponte.

== Reception and performance history ==
La capricciosa coretta premiered on 27 January 1795 under the title La scuola dei maritati to "rapturous applause" despite the presence of a large claque which had been hired to hiss the performance, partly by supporters of "real" Italian composers as opposed to the Spanish interloper, Martín y Soler, and partly by devotees of Brigida Banti who was also performing at the King's Theatre during that season and was the arch-rival of Anna Morichelli, the prima donna of La Capricciosa. The critic from the Morning Chronicle wrote of the premiere:

It is not easy to speak in adequate praise of this composition. The variety and beauty of the airs strike the most uninformed as forcibly as the most classical ear, and we are persuaded that they will all find their way to the English Theatre, and strike John Bull as pleasantly as they have the more refined taste of the Italian cognoscenti.

The opera initially ran for twelve performances and was revived four times at the King's Theatre in the ensuing years. As late as 1802, The Times wrote of the work that "no modern composition is equal to it".

Following the end of the 1795 season, Anna Morichelli returned to Italy and scored further triumphs in the leading role of La capricciosa, performing it in Venice in 1795; Florence, Genoa and Udine in 1796; and Pisa and Naples in 1797. By 1800, the opera had been performed in several other Italian cities as well as in Dresden, Prague, Vienna, Madrid, Lisbon, Weimar, and Darmstadt. It also received a performance in Paris at the Théâtre-Italien in 1819 with Joséphine Mainvielle-Fodor in the leading role. During this period it was variously performed under three alternative titles Gli sposi in contrasto, La moglie corretta, and La capricciosa corretta—the title used by Da Ponte and the one by which it is known today.

In its day, La capricciosa coretta was one of Martín y Soler's most frequently performed operas but eventually fell into oblivion until several early 21st-century revivals. In 2002, Christophe Rousset produced a critical edition of the score from a manuscript found in the Accademia Chigiana and conducted performances of the work with his ensemble Les Talens Lyriques for Opéra de Lausanne, later taking the production on tour to Bordeaux and Madrid. The televised Lausanne production was broadcast in the European Union in 2002, and a studio recording (with the same cast) was released in 2004. The opera was also performed in a new production by Patrik Sörling at the Drottningholm Festival in 2005, and the following year received yet another new production when it was performed by Bampton Classical Opera. The Bampton production was sung in English under the title The Taming of the Shrew using a new translation of the libretto by Robert Thicknesse.

== Roles ==
Roles, voice types
Role	Voice type	Premiere cast 27 January 1795
Ciprigna, the vain and capricious second wife of Bonario	soprano	Anna Morichelli Bosello
Bonario, a wealthy merchant	bass	Giovanni Morelli
Isabella, Bonario's daughter from his first marriage	mezzo-soprano	Elisabetta Colombati
Valerio, Bonario's son from his first marriage	tenor	Paolo Torreggiani
Lelio, a young count in love with Isabella	tenor	Luigi Brida
Giglio, Ciprigna's cavaliere servente	baritone	Carlo Rovedino
Cilia, Ciprigna's maid	soprano	Giovanna Pastorelli
Fiuta, Bonario's major domo and confidante	baritone	Lorenzo Cipriani
Captain Sbaraglia (Note: This character was eliminated in versions subsequent to the premiere.)	bass	Luigi Bonfanti
Bonario's servants, Turks, Moors, slaves, sailors

== Synopsis ==
Setting: A villa in Naples in the late 18th century. The action takes place over a single day.

=== Act 1 ===
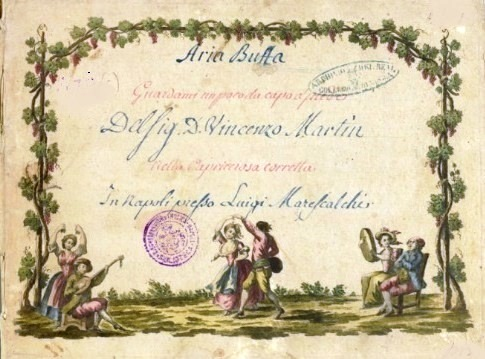
Cover of the score for Ciprigna's Act 1 aria "Guardami un poco da capo a piedi" (Look at me a bit from head to toe), published in Naples c. 1798

Bonario, a wealthy but mild-mannered merchant and former widower, is now married to Ciprigna. Much younger than her husband, Ciprigna is vain, capricious, and bullying. Bonario's children from his first marriage, Valerio and Isabella, and his servants, Fiuta the major domo and Cilia the maid, are so exasperated by her behaviour that they confront Bonario and threaten to leave his house unless he does something to curb his new wife's antics. Giglio, Ciprigna's fawning and flamboyant cavaliere servente, arrives and pays court to her. Their encounter in the garden is observed by Bonario, his children, and the servants. Bonario prepares a speech which he plans to deliver to Ciprigna in an attempt to reassert his authority but accidentally drops it. When she finds it, the outraged Ciprigna unbraids her husband in a lengthy tirade. Fiuta reproves his master for cowardice.

The young count Lelio, who is in love with Isabella, arrives to request her hand in marriage. Ciprigna is unaware of the purpose of his visit and smitten by the handsome young man, begins to flirt with him. Fiuta advises Lelio to play along with the flirtation in order to trap her. Bonario rehearses a new speech to his wife in front of an empty chair. Fiuta provides his master with pistols which he can use to intimidate Ciprigna when he makes his speech. However, she grabs the pistols, turns them on Bonario, and further terrifies him. Meanwhile, Valerio, Cilia and Fiuta trick Giglio into believing that assassins are after him. He hides in a closet from which he observes Lelio and Ciprigna's flirtation and her attempts to seduce him. When Giglio's hiding place is exposed, the act ends in uproar and confusion.

=== Act 2 ===
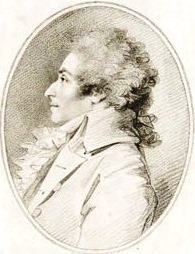
Giovanni Morelli who created the role of Bonario, Ciprigna's browbeaten husband

Worried about her reputation, Isabella rejects the suggestion that she elope with Lelio, while Valerio reiterates his threat to leave home and join the army. Undeterred, Fiuta vows to devise a new plan to defeat Ciprigna and promises to marry Cilia if he succeeds. Ciprigna, still unaware of Lelio's love for Isabella, is determined to have him. She tells Lelio that she has dismissed Giglio on finding out that he was already married and presents Lelio with jewels and property deeds belonging to Bonario. Lelio returns them to Bonario, who is so impressed that he consents to his marriage to Isabella. The furious Ciprigna then writes a letter to Giglio instructing him to kidnap Isabella and place her in a convent. Later, a mysterious oriental ambassador calling himself Irco Berlico (but actually Fiuta in disguise) arrives in Ciprigna's rooms accompanied by a retinue of Turks and Moors and praises her beauty. He convinces her to return with him to a magic island where she will be declared queen by forty young men and where she will remain forever young and beautiful.

As Ciprigna makes preparations to leave that night with the mysterious ambassador, Cilia discovers the plot to kidnap Isabella who is then rescued by Lelio. Later that night Ciprigna is about to depart for the magic island, but hears gunfire and then finds herself locked outside in a huge thunderstorm. Terrified, she begs to be let back into the house, seeks Bonario's forgiveness, and promises to submit to his authority. She is further humiliated when Fiuta reveals that he was the fictitious ambassador and the family berate her for her foolishness. She acknowledges her debt to Fiuta for bringing about her reform. Giglio is forgiven by the family but sent on his way. Bonario orders a feast to be prepared to celebrate the family's reconciliation.

== Recordings ==
- La capricciosa corretta – Marguerite Krull (Ciprigna), Josep Miquel Ramón (Fiuta), Yves Saelens (Lelio), Enrique Baquerizo (Bonario), Carlos Marin (Don Giglio), Katia Velletaz (Isabella), Raffaella Milanesi (Cilia), Emiliano González Toro (Valerio); Les Talens Lyriques orchestra and chorus conducted by Christophe Rousset. Label: Astrée Naïve.
