= Psyché (opera) =

Opera by Jean-Baptiste Lully

- Opera by Jean-Baptiste Lully
- Librettist: Thomas Corneille
- Language: French
- Based on: Molière's original play
- Premiere: 19 April 1678; Théâtre du Palais-Royal, Paris

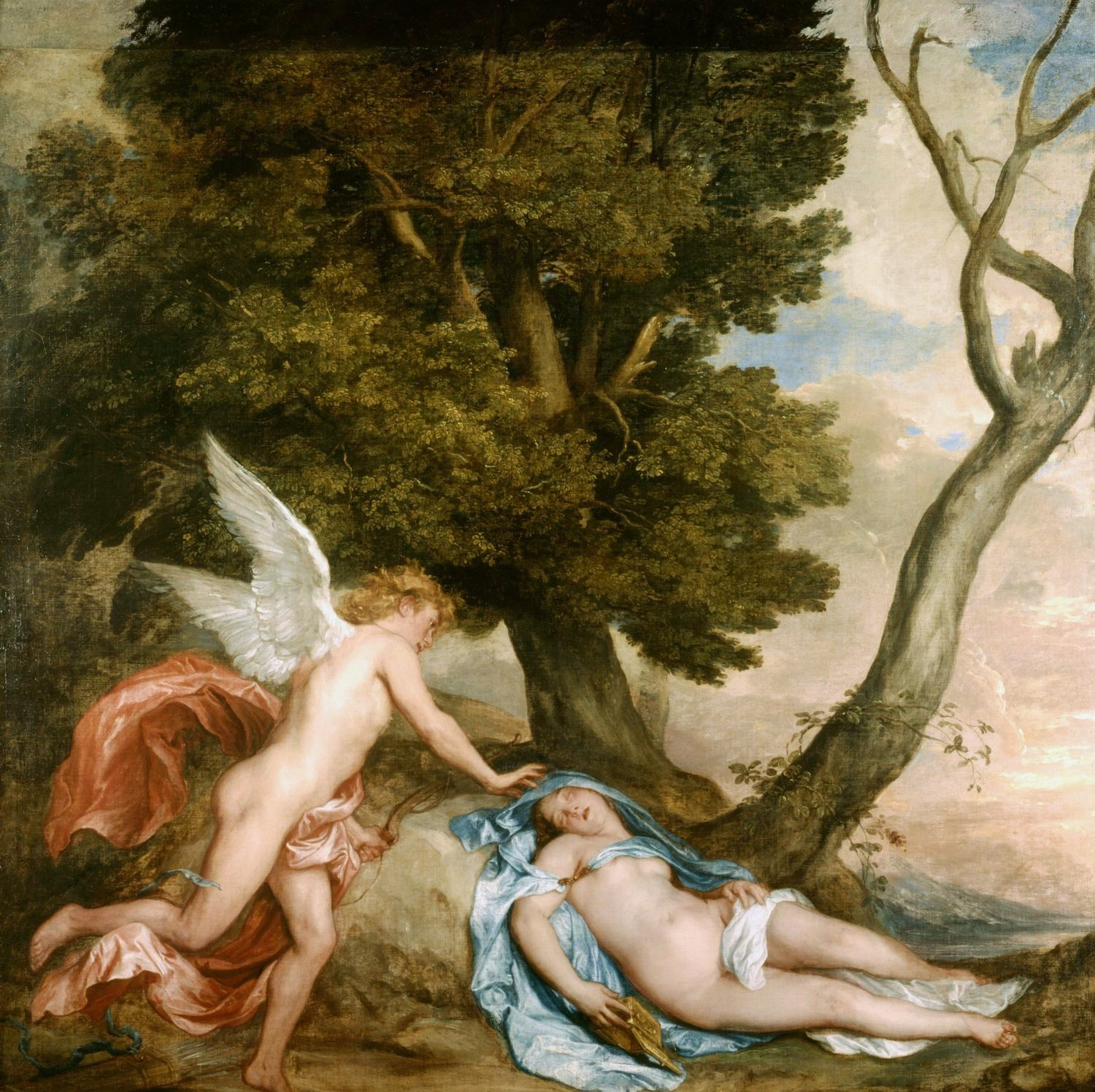
Cupid and Psyche (1639–40) by Anthony van Dyck

Psyché is an opera (tragédie lyrique) in a prologue and five acts composed by Jean-Baptiste Lully to a libretto by Thomas Corneille (adapted from Molière's original play for which Lully had composed the intermèdes). Based on the love story of Cupid and Psyche, Psyché was premiered on 19 April 1678, by the Académie Royale de Musique at the Théâtre du Palais-Royal in Paris.

== Background ==
According to the Mercure Galant, the opera Psyché was composed in three weeks; libretto, score and all. Although it is impossible to verify the truth of this statement, there is every reason to believe that Lully was in a hurry when writing this opera. In effect, the opera reuses the intermèdes from Molière's play. Since these intermèdes had met with such spectacular success seven years earlier, Lully must have felt that given his lack of time, he could at the very least attract a crowd with the promise of reviving the plainte italienne and the final divertissement.

All that was required was a synthesis of Molière's play (Molière had died in 1673) that could coherently string together the existent intermèdes. Such a text would have to be one third the length of the original — that is, 600 rather than 1800 lines long — and composed in varied rimes and rhythms rather than the alexandrines in riming couplets used in spoken declamation. Lully's usual librettist, Philippe Quinault, was inconveniently in disgrace at court over his previous opera Isis, and so the task fell to Thomas Corneille, likely at the bidding of the same cabal that had sought to disgrace Quinault.

Whether by choice or of necessity Corneille's text emerged not as a synthesis of the Molière but rather as a different plot for a profoundly different genre. Corneille's nephew, Bernard le Bovier de Fontenelle, is believed to have collaborated; it is impossible to know to what extent. No anecdote speaking of Psyché mentions Fontenelle. Nevertheless, the latter placed the libretto among his complete works without mention of his uncle. Conversely none of Corneille's three opera librettos appear in any of the editions of his works or theatre.

== Roles ==
Prologue

- Venus (soprano)
- L'Amour (mute)
- Flora (soprano)
- Vertumne (haute-contre)
- Palemon (taille)
- Nymphs of Flora (sopranos)
- Deities of land and water (chorus)

Tragedy

- Jupiter (bass)
- Venus (soprano)
- L’Amour (boy soprano/haute-contre)
- Mercure (haute-contre)
- Vulcain (haute-contre)
- Zéphir (haute-contre)
- The king, father of Psyché (bass)
- Psyché (soprano)
- Aglaure, Psyché's sister (soprano)
- Cidippe, Psyché's sister (soprano)
- Licas (bass)
- The god of a river (bass)
- Nymphs, Zephyruses & Amours (boy sopranos)
- Two nymphs of Acheron (sopranos)
- The three Furies (haute-contre, taille and bass)

Final divertissement

- Apollon (haute-contre)
- Bacchus (soprano)
- Mome (bass)
- Mars (haute-contre)
- Two Muses (sopranos)
- Silène (soprano)
- Two satyrs (taille and bass)

== Synopsis ==
The prologues to the two works are identical up until the arrival of Venus. In Corneille's text, Venus banishes the followers of Flora who had summoned her and calls her son Cupid to punish Psyché, whom mortals revere as a second Venus.

In the first act, Psyché's sisters learn with the spectators that Psyché must be sacrificed to a dragon that has been ravaging the kingdom. The plainte italienne from Molière's play is sung to represent the mourning of the people. The sisters flee at Psyché's arrival and it is her father who informs her of the oracle that has pronounced her doom. Psyché unhesitatingly climbs the rock to offer herself in sacrifice, much to her father's consternation, and is carried away by Zephyrs.

Act two opens with Vulcan and a group of cyclops who are building a palace for Psyché at Cupid's bidding. Just before Vulcan can complete the palace, he is surprised by his wife Venus who discovers that her son has betrayed her. She quarrels with her husband and vows revenge against her son. Psyché awakes and is courted by Cupid. The act ends in a happy love scene, but Cupid must hide his identity and begins a divertissement sung by three nymphs to divert Psyché's attention.

In act three, Venus disguises herself as a Nymph and gives Psyché a lamp with which to discover the identity of her lover. Psyché is overjoyed to discover that her lover is Cupid himself, but the light of the lamp awakes the god who flees. At the same time, the palace disappears and Psyché is left in a desolate wilderness. Venus exposes her treachery to Psyché and further accuses her of trying to marry her way into immortality. She forces her to descend to hell and recover a box wherein Proserpine keeps her beauty. Psyché, in despair, attempts to drown herself, but is saved by the River God who peacefully accompanies her to the underworld.

In act four, Psyché resists the torture of the three Furies in order to meet the Nymphs of the Acheron. These nymphs banish the Furies, give Psyché the box she is looking for and conduct her to Venus's garden where act five is set.

In act five, Psyché opens the box, hoping to restore any beauty she might have lost during her recent hardships. But instead of beauty, the box exudes a poisonous vapour that kills Psyché. Venus appears to rejoice and brings Psyché back to life in order to gloat and torture her further. She is amazed to see that Psyché is still in love with her son despite so many hardships. But she is resolved to continue punishing her. Mercury descends and begs her to stop, recounting the chaos and suffering in the universe that has been produced by Cupid's displeasure. Venus takes no heed and Jupiter descends himself to calm the goddess and pronounce Psyché immortal. The lovers are united and the opera ends with a magnificent ballet, identical to the one closing the 1671 version.

== Reception ==
Accounts of the success of the opera vary greatly. The Mercure Galant states that the opera was extremely well received; that audiences were enthralled by Lully's music as always and that they would never have guessed that Corneille had composed the libretto in so little time as three weeks. On the other hand, the Frères Parfraict in their Histoire de l'académie royale de musique claim that the opera is "irremediably cold" and that "the diabolical character of Venus ruins what little galantry there is to be found" in it. These reports are both equally difficult to believe when one considers, on the one hand, that Thomas Corneille was one of the chief editors of the Mercure Galant and, on the other hand, in what contempt the Parfaict brothers held all authors of the 17th century other than Pierre Corneille, Molière, Jean Racine and, for opera, Philippe Quinault. Might they have felt obligated to condemn Thomas Corneille's libretto out of fidelity to his brother, Molière and most of all Quinault whose place Thomas Corneille may have thought he was usurping indefinitely? The Parfaict brothers' attitude seems to have remained the dominant one since the 18th century. Robert Fajon, in his Opéra à Paris du Roi Soleil à Louis le Bien-Aimé, even goes so far as to accuse Thomas Corneille of being responsible for Lully's only operatic failure. Concretely, however, none of Lully's operas were a failure. Their success continued to daunt operatic composers well into the 18th century. It is true that Psyché, unlike many of Lully's operas, was not created at court and was only revived twice (once in 1703 and again in 1713). Thésée, by comparison was revived ten times and remained in the repertoire of the Académie royale de musique until 1744.

== Recordings ==
- Psyché, Carolyn Sampson (Psyché), Karina Gauvin (Vénus), Aaron Sheehan (L’Amour), Amanda Forsythe (Aglaure), Colin Blazer (Vulcain), Mireille Lebel (Cidippe), Yulia Van Doren (Femme affligée), Olivier Laquerre, Jason McStoots, Matthew Shaw, Aaron Engebreth; Boston Early Music Festival Chorus and Orchestra, conducted by Paul O'Dette and Stephen Stubbs (CPO, 3 CDs, 2008)
- Psyché, Ambroisine Bré (Psyché), Bénédicte Tauran (Vénus), Eugénie Lefebvre (Flore, Cidippe), Déborah Cachet (Amour, Aglaure), Cyril Auvity (Vertumne, Amour jeune homme), Robert Getchell (Vulcain), Fabien Hyon (Palémon, Silène), Zachary Wilder (Apollon, Zéphire), Philippe Estèphe (Jupiter, homme affligé), Anas Séguin (Lycas, Le Roi), Matthieu Heim (Mars), Dominique Bonnetain, Benoît Porcherot; Les Talens Lyriques, conducted by Christophe Rousset (Chateau de Versailles Spectacles 86 [2 CDs] 145 minutes, 2022)

== Sources ==
- Arnason, Luke, Psyché. De Thomas Corneille, critical edition of the 1678 libretto, master's thesis at the Sorbonne (pdf copy at the University of Manitoba)
- Gaines, James F. (2002). The Molière Encyclopedia. Greenwood Publishing Group. ISBN 0-313-31255-9
- Midgette, Anne (June 16, 2007). "Singing! Dancing! Tragedy! Comedy! Resurrecting a 1600s Operatic Spectacle". New York Times
- Powell, John S. (2000). Music and Theatre in France, 1600-1680. Oxford University Press. ISBN 0-19-816599-4
- Sadie, Julie Anne (1998). Companion to Baroque Music. University of California Press. ISBN 0-520-21414-5
