= Thomas Corneille =

French lexicographer and dramatist (1625-1709)

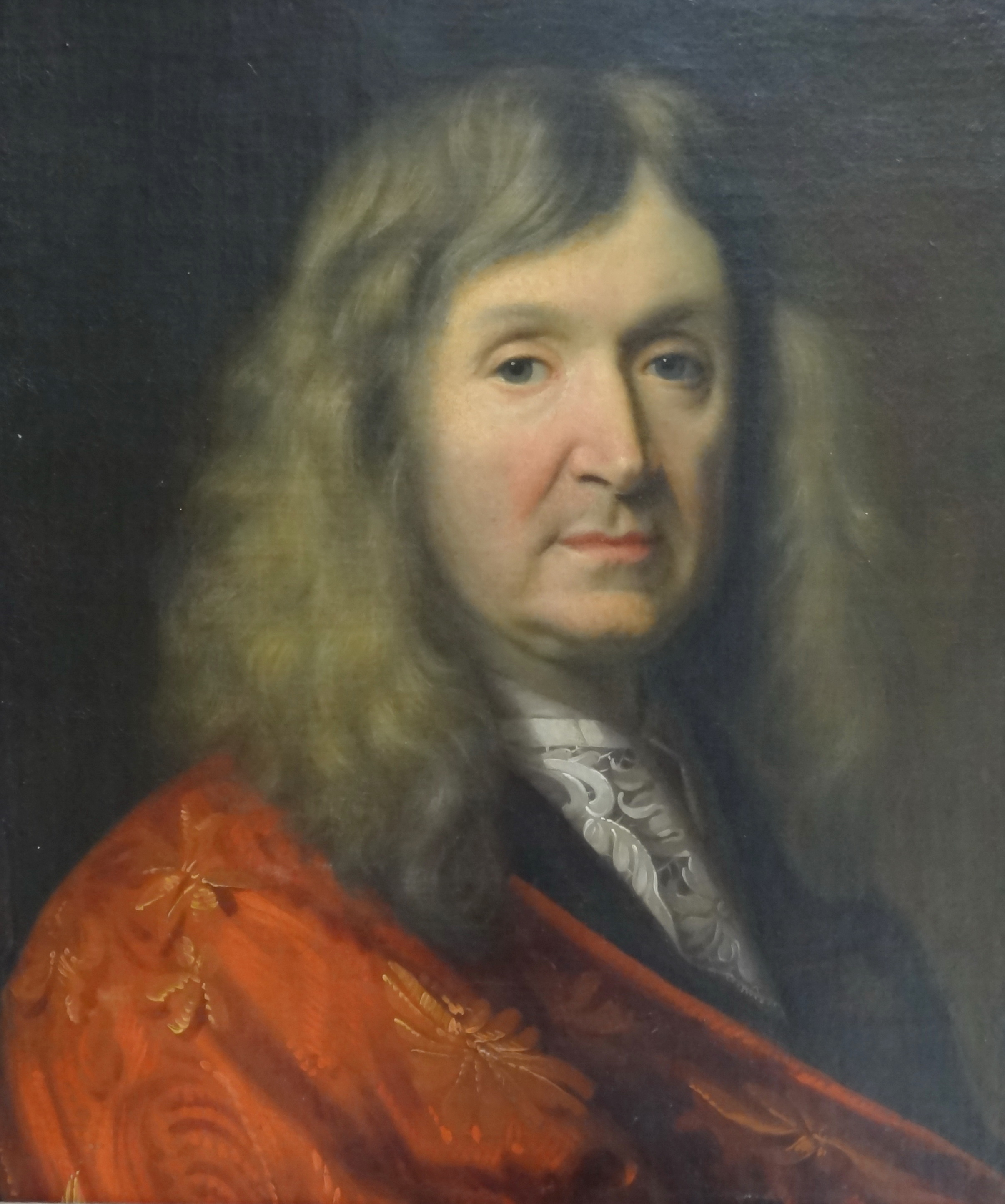
Thomas Corneille (Jacob van Loo, Musée des Beaux-Arts de Rouen)

Thomas Corneille (20 August 1625 – 8 December 1709) was a French lexicographer and dramatist.

== Biography ==
Born in Rouen some nineteen years after his brother Pierre, the "great Corneille", Thomas's skill as a poet seems to have shown itself early. At the age of fifteen he composed a play in Latin which was performed by his fellow-pupils at the Jesuit school in Rouen, the Collège de Bourbon (now the Lycée Pierre Corneille). His first play in the French language, Les Engagements du hasard, was probably first performed at the Hôtel de Bourgogne in 1647, although not published until 1656. Le Feint Astrologue, imitated from the Spanish of Pedro Calderón de la Barca, and itself imitated in Dryden's An Evening's Love, came the following year. His play Le Galant doublé (1660) was later the basis for Susanna Centlivre's 1706 play into Love at a Venture.

After his brother's death, Thomas succeeded his vacant chair in the Académie française. He then turned his attention to philology, producing a new edition of the Remarques of CF Vaugelas in 1687. His Le Dictionnaire des Arts et des Sciences first appeared in 1694 as a supplement to the first edition of Le dictionnaire de l'Academie françoise—also published that year—and as a competitor to Furetière's Dictionaire universel of 1690. Corneille's Dictionnaire is regarded by Kafker as one of the nine Notable encyclopaedias of the seventeenth and eighteenth centuries that preceded Diderot and d'Alembert's Encyclopédie.

A complete translation of Ovid's Metamorphoses (he had published six books with the Heroic Epistles some years previously) followed in 1697.

In 1704 he lost his sight and was constituted a "veteran," a dignity which gave him the privileges of an academician, while exempting him from the duties. He did not allow his blindness to put a stop to his work, however, and in 1708 produced a large Dictionnaire universel géographique et historique in three volumes folio. This was his last major work. He died at Les Andelys at the age of eighty-four.

== List of plays ==
- Les Engagements du hasard (1647)
- Le Feint astrologue (1648)
- Don Bertrand de Cigarral (1650)
- L'Amour à la mode (1651)
- Le Charme de la voix (1653)
- Les Illustres ennemis (1654)
- Le Geolier de soi-même (1655)
- Timocrate (1656)
- Bérénice (1657)
- La Mort de l'empereur Commode (1658)
- Stilicon (1660)
- Le Galant doublé (1660)
- Camma (1661)
- Maximian (1662)
- Persée et Démétrius (1663)
- Antiochus (1666)
- Laodice (1668)
- Le Baron d'Albikrac (1668)
- La Mort d'Annibal (1669)
- La Comtesse d'Orgueil (1670)
- Ariane (1672)
- La Mort d’Achille (1673).
- Don César D'Avalos (1674)
- Circé (1675)
- L'Inconnu (1675)
- Le Festin de pierre (1677)
- Le Triomphe des dames (1676)
- Le Comte d'Essex (1678)
- La Devineresse (1679)
- Bradamante (1695)

== Opera libretto ==
- Médée for Charpentier (1693, adapted from Pierre Corneille's play of the same name and Euripides)

== Place in French literature ==
Thomas Corneille has often been regarded as one who, but for his surname, would merit no notice. Others feel he was unlucky in having a brother (Pierre Corneille) who outshone him, as he would have outshone almost anyone else. In 1761 Voltaire wrote of Thomas Corneille: ‘si vous exceptez Racine, auquel il ne faut comparer personne, il était le seul de son temps qui fût digne d’être le premier au-dessous de son frère' (if you except Racine, to whom nobody can be compared, he was the first of his time who was worthy to be behind his brother).

The brothers were close, and practically lived together. Of his forty-two plays (the highest number assigned to him), the last edition of his complete works contains only thirty-two dramas, but he wrote several in collaboration with other authors. Two are usually reprinted as his masterpieces at the end of his brother's selected works. These are Ariane (1672) and the Le Comte d'Essex (The Earl of Essex (1678)), in the former of which Rachel attained success. (An oil painting depicting a scene from Le Comte d'Essex is in the Hermitage Museum.) But of Laodice, Camma, Stilico and some other pieces, Pierre Corneille himself said that "he wished he had written them," and he was not wont to speak lightly. Camma (1661, on the same story as Tennyson's Cup) deserves special notice.

Thomas Corneille is remarkable in the literary gossip-history of his time. His Timocrate boasted of the longest run (80 nights) recorded of any play during the century. For La Devineresse, he and his cowriter Jean Donneau de Visé, founder of the Mercure galant (to which Thomas contributed), received over 6,000 livres, the largest sum known to have been paid during that period. Lastly, one of his pieces (Le Baron des Fondrières) claims the honor of being the first which was booed off the stage. Thomas Corneille is also remarkable for having excelled in almost all dramatic genres of his time, including the new and innovative genres that were the pièce à machines and opera at the time. His machine play Circé was among the most successful of the century. His three opera librettos, Psyché (1678), Bellérophon (1679) and Médée (1693) make him, next to Philippe Quinault and Jean Galbert de Campistron, one of the most important French librettists of the seventeenth century.

In a letter to her father, shortly before her execution, Charlotte Corday quotes Thomas Corneille: "Le Crime fait la honte, et non pas l’échafaud!" (The crime causes the shame, and not the scaffold!).
