= Uthal (opera) =

- Opéra comique by Étienne Méhul
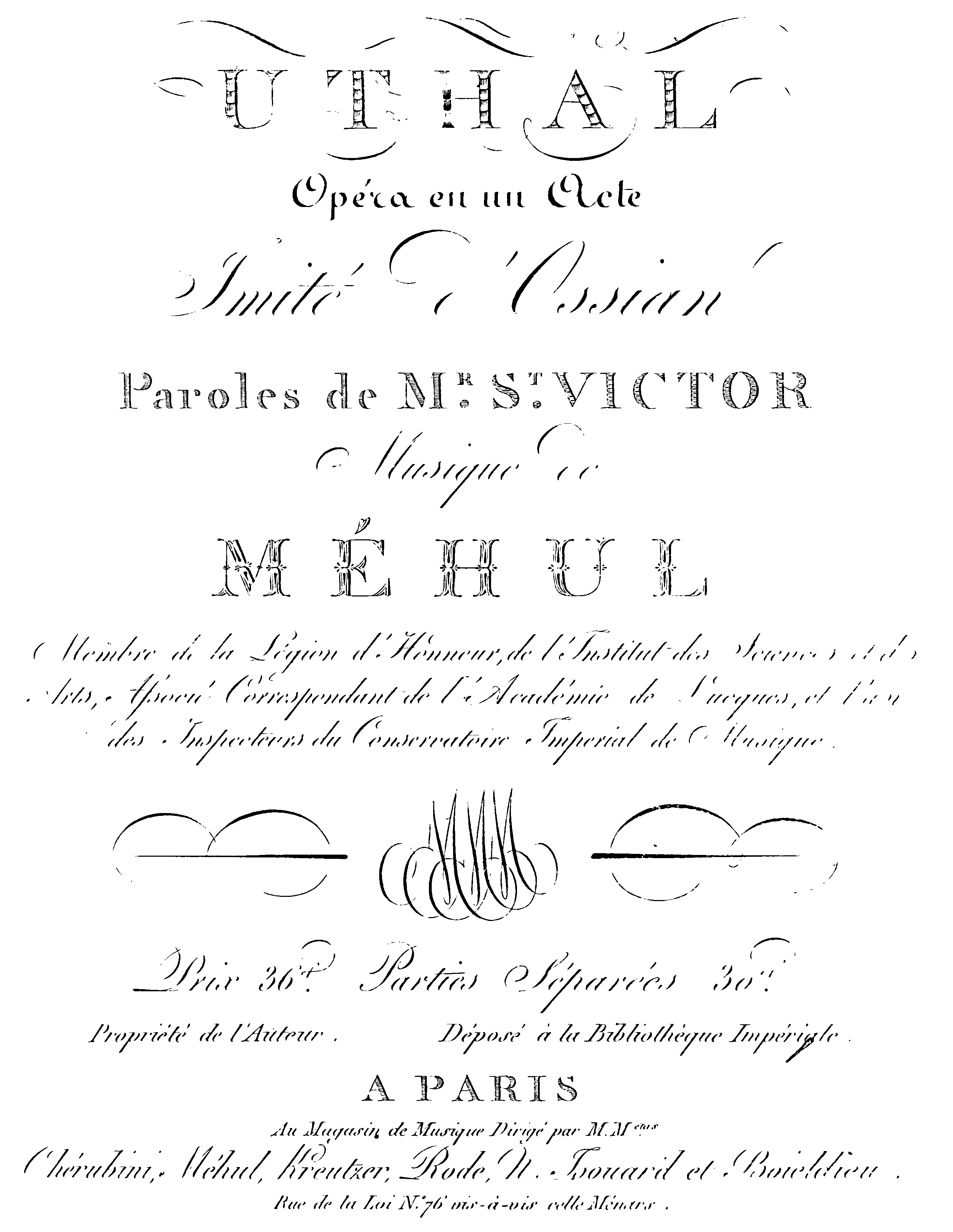
- Title page of the score
- Librettist: Jacques-Benjamin-Maximilien Bins de Saint-Victor
- Language: French
- Based on: Ossian poems by James Macpherson
- Premiere: 17 May 1806; Opéra-Comique, Paris

Uthal is an opéra comique in one act by the French composer Étienne Méhul. The libretto, by Jacques-Benjamin-Maximilien Bins de Saint-Victor is based on the Ossian poems of James Macpherson. It was first performed at the Opéra-Comique in Paris on 17 May 1806. Méhul tried to give the work a dark "Scottish" atmosphere by eliminating the violins from the orchestra and replacing them with violas.

== Roles ==
Role	Voice type	Premiere Cast, 17 May 1806 (Conductor: - )
Uthal	haute-contre	Jean-Baptiste-Sauveur Gavaudan
Malvina	soprano	Julie-Angélique Scio
Ullin	tenor	Pierre Gaveaux
Larmor	baritone	Jean-Pierre Solié
Chief bard	bass	Baptiste Cadet

== Synopsis ==
Uthal has seized the lands of his father-in-law Larmor, who sends the bard Ullin to get help from Fingal, chief of Morven. Malvina, Uthal's wife and Larmor's daughter, is divided between love for her husband and her father and seeks in vain to delay the war. Uthal is beaten in battle and sentenced to banishment. When Malvina offers to follow him into exile, Uthal confesses that he has been wrong and he and Larmor are reconciled.

== The work ==
Uthal was part of the European vogue for the Ossianic poems of Macpherson. Another notable example from the time is the opera Ossian, ou Les bardes (1804) by Méhul's rival Jean-François Le Sueur. In fact, critics accused Méhul's librettist Saint-Victor of copying Les bardes, an allegation Saint-Victor rejected, claiming his work would have been ready in 1804 had it not been for a "host of obstacles".

Méhul in 1799 – portrait by Antoine Gros

Méhul's orchestration in Uthal is strikingly experimental. In his Treatise on Orchestration, Berlioz, an admirer of the composer, wrote, "Méhul was so struck by the kinship between the sound of violas and the dreamy character of Ossianic poetry that in his opera Uthal he used them constantly, even to the complete exclusion of the violins. The result, according to the critics of the day, was an intolerable monotony which ruined the opera's chances of success. This is what prompted Grétry to exclaim: 'I'd give a louis d'or for the sound of an E string!'" Part of this statement has been challenged. Edward Dent wrote, "It has been suggested that the opera would for this reason [i.e. the lack of violins] be unbearably tedious, but, as Sir Donald Tovey has pointed out, Uthal is in one act only and quite short, so that its peculiar colouring would hardly have time to become oppressive." In fact, contemporary critics praised Uthal, it was the public that was less enthusiastic and the opera was withdrawn after 15 performances.

The overture depicting the heroine Malvina crying out for her lost father amid the storm has been compared to similar opening music in Grétry's Aucassin et Nicolette and Gluck's Iphigénie en Tauride (both 1779). Winton Dean describes it as "athematic, at moments almost atonal, and in no definable form."

== Performance history ==
In modern times, a BBC studio recording of the opera was made on 21 October 1972 for broadcast on Radio 3 on 4 March 1973. Stanford Robinson conducted the BBC Concert Orchestra with John Wakefield in the role of Uthal and Laura Sarti as Malvina.

On 30 May 2015 there was a concert performance at Versailles with Christophe Rousset conducting Les Talens Lyriques and the Chœur de Chambre de Namur. Yann Beuron sang Uthal and Karine Deshayes Malvina.

== Recording ==
The Rousset performance was recorded and released as a CD by Ediciones Singulares in February 2017.

== Sources ==
- Adélaïde de Place Étienne Nicolas Méhul (Bleu Nuit Éditeur, 2005)
- Edward Joseph Dent The Rise of Romantic Opera (Cambridge University Press, 1979 edition)
- Winton Dean, chapter on French opera in Gerald Abraham (ed.) The New Oxford History of Music Volume 8: The Age of Beethoven 1790-1830 (Oxford University Press, 1988)
- The Viking Opera Guide ed. Holden (Viking, 1993)
- Hugh Macdonald (ed, and translator) Berlioz's Orchestration Treatise: a Translation and Commentary (Cambridge University Press, 2002)
- Ian Kemp (ed.) Berlioz: Les Troyens (Cambridge University Press, 1988)
- Del Teatro (in Italian)
- Casaglia, Gherardo (2005). "Uthal, 17 May 1806". L'Almanacco di Gherardo Casaglia (in Italian).
