= Alceste (Lully) =

Opera by Jean-Baptiste Lully

- Opera by Jean-Baptiste Lully
- Title page of the libretto
- Librettist: Philippe Quinault
- Language: French
- Based on: Euripides' Alcestis
- Premiere: 19 January 1674; Théâtre du Palais-Royal, Paris

Alceste, ou Le triomphe d'Alcide is a tragédie en musique in a prologue and five acts by Jean-Baptiste Lully. The French-language libretto is by Philippe Quinault, after Euripides' Alcestis. It was first performed on 19 January 1674 at the Théâtre du Palais-Royal by the Paris Opera.

The opera was presented in celebration of King Louis XIV's victory against Franche-Comté, and the prologue features nymphs longing for his return from battle. The opera itself concerns Alceste, princess of Iolcos and queen of Thessaly, who in the first act is abducted by Licomède (Lycomedes), king of Scyros, with the aid of his sister Thetis, a sea nymph; Aeolus, the god of the winds; and other supernatural forces. In the battle to rescue her, Alcide (Hercules) is triumphant, but Alceste's husband, Admète (Admetus), suffers a mortal wound. Apollo agrees to let Admète live if someone will die in his place. Alceste stabs herself to fulfill this requirement, but is rescued from the Underworld by Alcide, who loves her. The opera ends with a celebration of Alceste's return from the underworld and of Alcide's noble gallantry in returning her to her husband and relinquishing any claims to her.

Alceste is Lully's second tragédie en musique, after Cadmus et Hermione. It was revived at Court twice in 1677 and once again in 1678.

== Roles ==
Role	Voice type	Cast, 1678 (Conductor: – )
Nymph of the Seine	soprano	Mlle Saint-Christophle
La Gloire	soprano	Mlle de La Garde
Nymph of the Tuileries	soprano	Mlle Rebel
Nymph of the Marne	soprano	Mlle Ferdinand
Alceste, Princess of Iolcos	soprano	Mlle Saint-Christophe
Admète, King of Thessaly	haute-contre	Bernard Clédière
Alcide (Hercules), Greek hero	baritone	Jean Gaye
Licomède, King of Scyros and brother of Thetis	bass	Jacques Godonesche
Lychas, confidant of Alcide	haute-contre	François Langeais
Straton, confidant of Lycomedes	bass	Antoine Morel
Céphise, confidante of Alcestis	soprano	Mlle Beaucreux
Cléante, knight of Admetus	tenor	Frizon
Pherès, father of Admetus	tenor	Gingan
Charon,	baritone	Antoine Morel
Pluton,	bass	Jacques Godonesche
Thétis, a sea-nymph	soprano	Mlle des Fronteaux (or Desfronteaux)
Apollon,	haute-contre	Le Roy
Proserpine,	soprano	Mlle Bony
The Ghost of Alcestis,	silent role	
Alecton, a Fury	haute-contre (en travesti)	Le Roy
A Rebuffed Ghost,	soprano	
Eole, King of the winds	baritone	Puvigny
Diane,	soprano	Mlle Piesche
Mercure (Mercury)	silent role	

== Synopsis ==
=== Prologue ===
The Nymph of the Seine longs for Louis XIV to return from battle. A Soprano assures her that he follows Glory and will return. A celebration of the pastoral divinities commences.

=== Act 1 ===
The scene shows a port in Thessaly where we see a great ship, decorated and prepared for a festival, at anchor alongside several warships.

A grand festival is planned for the wedding of Alceste and Admète, the king of Thessaly. Alcide, who also loves Alceste, tells his man Lychas that he would prefer not to attend the wedding, so as not to suffer unnecessarily. Lychas persuades him to stay until nightfall, so as not to invite gossip.

In the next scene, Lychas and Straton each claim that Céphise has professed to love them, but neither believes the other, each thinking himself to be her only lover. Lychas then leaves Straton with Céphise, and eavesdrops on them. Céphise admits to her inconstancy, but is unapologetic. Straton is indignant, having been faithful to her for two years.

Lycomède enters and interrupts the dialogue between Céphise and Straton. Lycomède also loves Alceste, but he seems to be more at peace with his rejection than Alceste, even undertaking to help plan the day's festivities.

Later, during the festivities, Lycomède and Straton lead Céphise and Alceste onto Lycomède's ship, explaining that this is part of the entertainment. But before Alcide and Admète have had time to board, the gangway collapses into the sea. The boat then leaves and sets sail for Scyros with Céphise and Alceste on board. It is revealed that Lycomède, with Straton's help, had been plotting to kidnap Alceste for revenge on Admète. The Thessalonians try to get in their own ships and give chase, but the goddess Thétis, Lycomède's sister, commands the North Winds to create a violent storm so as to protect her brother's flight.

But soon, the god Éole intervenes. He calms the storm and sends the gentle West Winds to displace the North Winds, allowing Admète's ships to chase the traitors all the way to Scyros.

=== Act 2 ===
On the island of Scyros. The scene shows the main town of the Island.

On Scyros, Céphise is being held prisoner by Straton, and likewise Alceste is the prisoner of Lycomède.

Hoping to regain her freedom, Céphise tries to placate Straton by promising to be faithful to him. Skeptical of this promise, Straton agrees to free her on the condition that she marry him first. Being wary, Céphise tells him that she won't marry him until she is free.

The dialogue is interrupted by the arrival of Lycomède and Alceste. Alceste tries to calm the anger of her kidnapper by explaining that no one can be forced to love, and that he shouldn't take his rejection personally. But nothing works: Furious, desperate, and ruthless, Lycomède cannot be persuaded to give up his revenge.

Straton then goes to warn Lycomède that enemy troops, led by Admète and Alcide, are approaching the city. Alceste tries one last time to reason with Lycomède and urges him to surrender rather than cause needless bloodshed. But the king, refusing to hear her supplications, makes her enter the fortified city and prepares for a siege.

Thanks to the heroics of Alcide and the determination of Admète, after a tumultuous battle which destroys the fortifications, the city is finally taken and the defenders surrender or are taken prisoner.

Alceste and Céphise are freed. Alcide returns the princess to the arms of Admète's father, Phérès, and they go to look for Admète. He leaves immediately, so as to avoid having to suffer again by seeing the happiness of a young couple.

After the departure of Alcide and Lychas, Alceste discovers Admète on the ground, mortally wounded by Lycomède. Seeing the tears of his wife, the king, much weakened and aware of his situation, tells Alceste not to cry and assures her that he will have been happy to die for her.

Apollo enters the scene and announces to the king that he has permitted him to escape death, on the condition that someone agree to die in his stead. At this prospect, the Arts appear and raise up a monument to the glory of the person who would sacrifice himself or herself for Admète.

=== Act 3 ===
The scene is of a great monument erected by the Arts. In the middle is an empty altar which will hold the image of the person who sacrifices their life for Admète.

Alceste, in tears, asks the gods not to rob her of her husband, even as Admète is dying. No one, for the moment, has offered to take his place, and each character gives a good reason why he should not make such a sacrifice: Céphise says she is too young to die; Phérès says he is too old.

Alceste withdraws sadly, understanding that she cannot count on anyone else to save her husband. Céphise follows her.

Cléante, a friend of the king, comes to warn Phérès that Admète has only a few more moments to live. Suddenly, a joyous ritornello is heard, and Admète enters, miraculously cured. Happy to have survived, and to be soon able to dry the tears of his beloved wife, he asks the gods to reveal to him the image of the person who gave their life for him.

The altar's curtains open, revealing the image of Alceste stabbing herself, while Céphise announces that the princess just died, sacrificing herself for him whom she loved.

Overwhelmed with sadness, Admète falls into the arms of his entourage. A party of sad men and another of women carrying flowers and all the ornaments which had adorned Alceste, enter and hold a funeral ceremony. A hysterical pain takes hold of the crowd: Some rend their garments, others tear their hair, and each person breaks, at the foot of the image of Alceste, the ornaments he carries.

At this time, Alcide enters. Intrigued by the wailing and by the funeral ceremony, he has delayed his departure. Quickly having been brought up to speed on the situation, he talks to Admète and offers to go look for Alceste in Hades, but on the condition that when he returns with her, she should be made his own wife. Without hesitation, the king agrees to renounce his love for her and urges Alcide to snatch Alceste out of the jaws of death.

The moon appears. Its globe opens up and displays Diana on a shining cloud. She announces that the gods, moved by such a beautiful idea, have decided to help Alcide by opening a new passage into Hades. Mercury flies down to hit the ground with his caduceus. The passage opens and Alcide descends into it.

=== Act 4 ===
The scene shows the river Acheron and its gloomy banks. A few ghosts are waiting for Charon. He arrives rowing in his boat.

Charon takes into his boat those ghosts who can pay him, ferry them across the Acheron. Without compunction or pity, he chases away the souls who cannot pay.

Alcide enters the scene and jumps into the boat while Charon is chasing away the ghosts there. Ignoring the ferryman's protests and threats, he commands him to take him to Pluto without further argument.

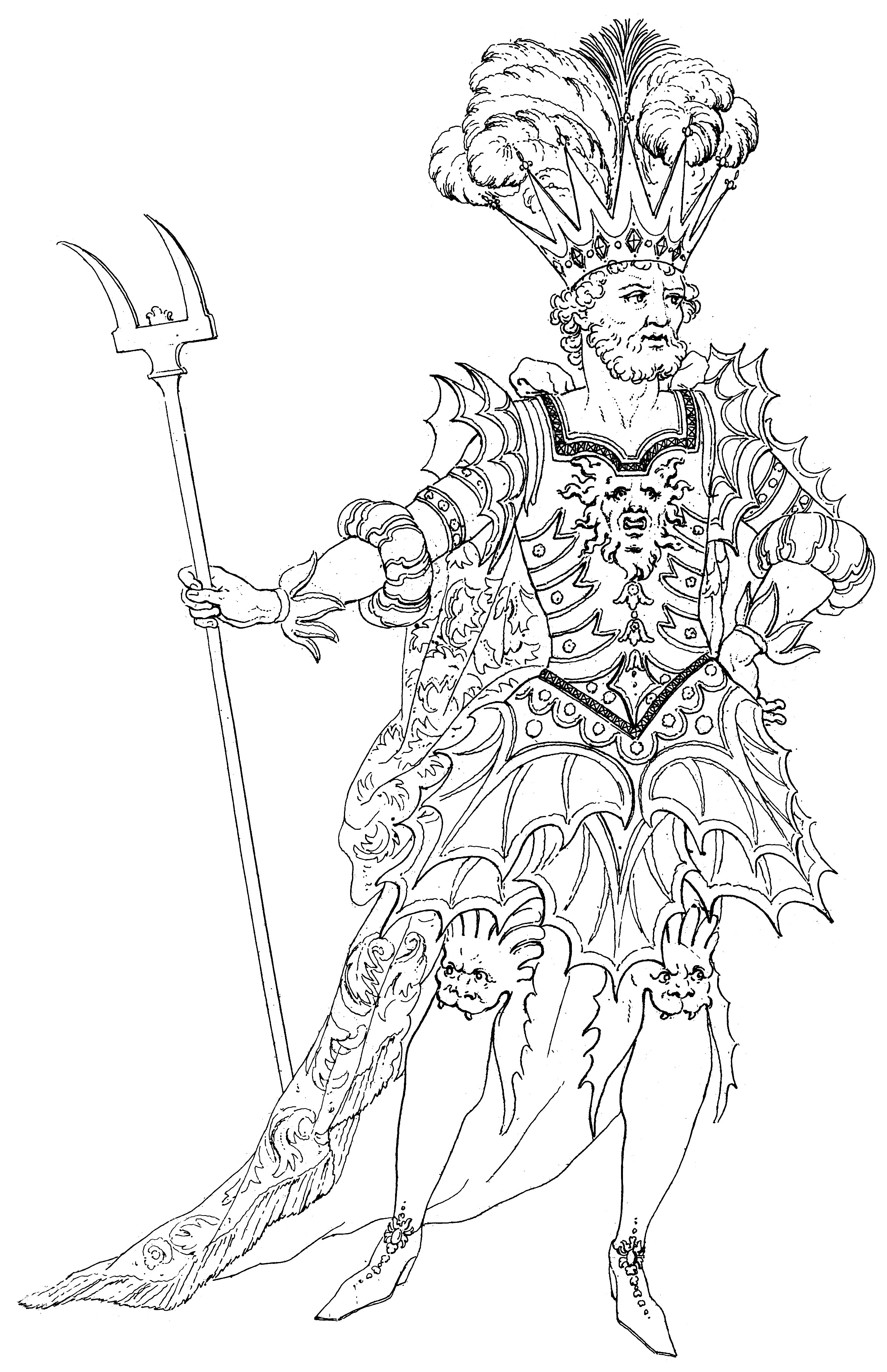
Costume design for Pluto by Jean Bérain

The scene changes. It now shows Pluto's palace. Pluto is seated on his throne. Proserpina, Pluto's followers, and the ghost of Alceste are around him.

Pluto and Proserpina bid welcome to the ghost of Alceste and organized a party in her honor. But Alecton enters in great haste, interrupts the festivities, and informs Pluto that Alcide has come down to attack Hades.

Pluto releases Cerberus to bar Alcide's route, but Alcide quickly subdues the guardian of the Underworld and puts him in chains. Pluto, therefore, admits defeat. But Alcide reassures him: he hadn't come to conquer the Realm of the Dead, but simply to search for Alceste.

Touched by the sincerity of his love, Proserpina insists to her husband that he should support Alcide's quest. Pluto, also moved by this great love, agrees to let both Alcide and Alceste leave. In order to facilitate their return, Pluto puts his own chariot and his own escort at their disposal. Alcide and Alceste's ghost get into Pluto's chariot, which flies escorted by a flying troop of Pluto's followers.

=== Act 5 ===
The scene contains a triumphal arch between two amphitheaters, where a multitude of different Grecian peoples can be seen assembled to receive Alcide in his triumph from the Underworld.

Among the people gathered to welcome Alcide is Admète, who rejoices at the thought of seeing Alceste living again. Yet he remembers his agreement with Alcide. Alceste will regain her life, but her life will no longer be devoted to him. Admète smothers these regrets, telling himself that seeing Alceste alive is the most important thing. Forbidding himself from feeling sorry for himself, he pulls himself together and rejoins the rejoicing crowd so as to be able freely to celebrate Acide's triumph.

On the occasion of the celebrations, Lychas has decided to free Straton (chained up since the end of Act 2) and to make up with him. Seeing Céphise arrive, they both ask her to choose which one of them she wishes to have for her future husband. But the girl refuses to choose and informs them that she has no intention of getting married. The two suitors seem to accept this and all three participate in the celebration.

Alcide and Alceste enter. Alcide accuses Alceste of having eyes for only Admète, and reminds her that despite this, she is his. Alceste assures him that she has no intention of betraying Admète's commitments, but she adds that it would have been impossible to bring back her life without also bringing back her feelings.

Alceste and Admète say moving farewells, because, for them, duty must be stronger than love.

Admète leaves and Alceste offers her hand in marriage to Alcide. But Alcide, moved by the depth of their feelings, stops her and turns down her offer. Thus Alcide, having triumphed over the Underworld's monsters, finally learns how to "triumph over himself."

== Audio recordings ==
- 1974: conducted by Jean-Claude Malgoire; cast: Felicity Palmer (Alceste), Bruce Brewer (Admète), Max van Egmond (Alcide), François Loup (Caron and Licomède) — 1974 studio recording for CBS
- 1992: conducted by Jean-Claude Malgoire; cast: Colette Alliot-Lugaz (Alceste), Howard Crook (Admète), Jean-Philippe Lafont (Alcide), Gregory Reinhart (Caron), François Loup (Licomède); supporting cast: Veronique Gens, Jean-François Gardeil, Olivier Lallouette, Gilles Ragon and Sophie-Marin Degor; chorus and orchestra: La Grande Écurie et La Chambre du Roy — live in Paris, 4-8 Jan. 1992, Disques Montaigne (later released on Astrée Auvidis)
- 2017: conducted by Christophe Rousset; cast: van Wanroij (Alceste), González Toro (Admète), Crossley-Mercer (Alcide), Williams (Caron and Licomède); Choeur de Chambre de Namur; Les Talens Lyriques; 13–16 July 2017; studio recording for Aparté; Grammy-nominated
