= Il burbero di buon cuore =

- Opera by Vicente Martín y Soler
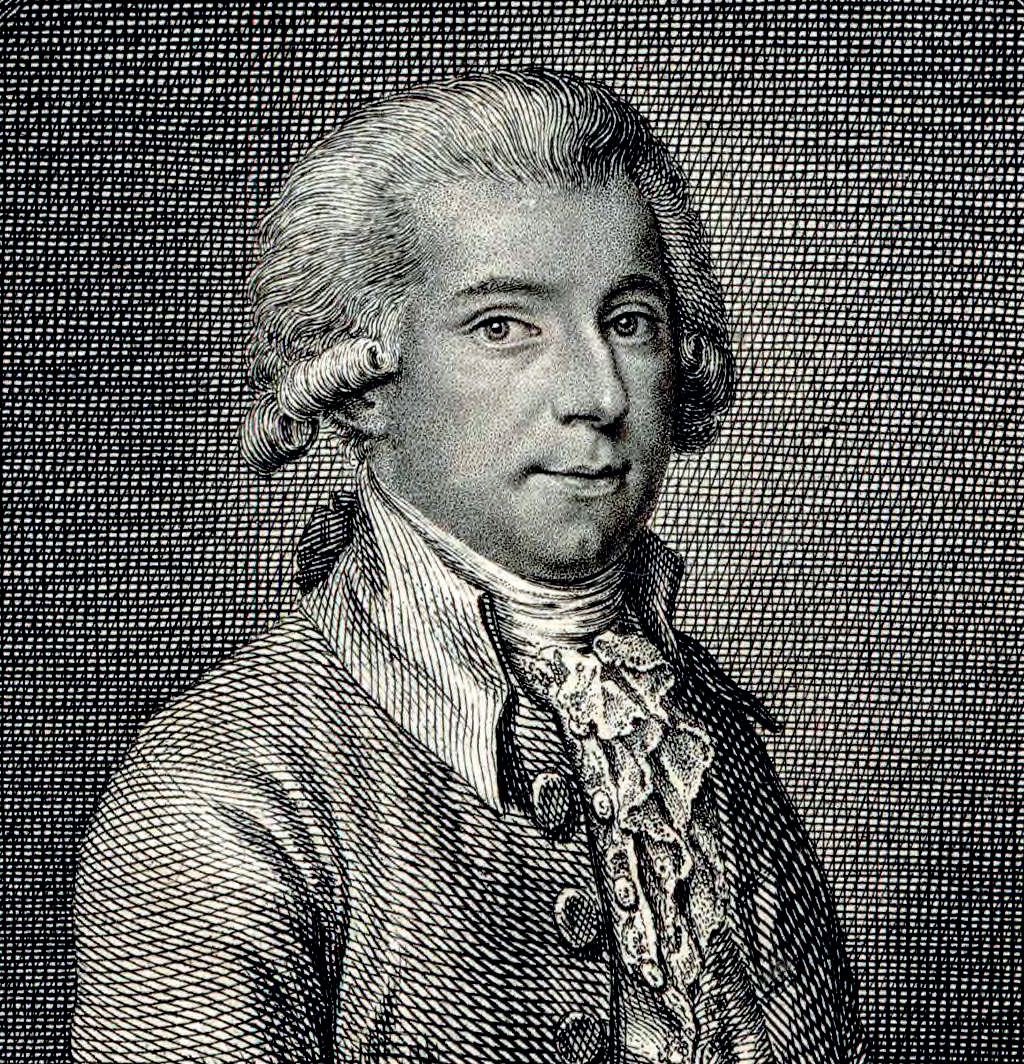
- Vicente Martín y Soler
- Librettist: Lorenzo Da Ponte
- Premiere: 4 January 1786; Burgtheater, Vienna

Il burbero di buon cuore (The Good-Hearted Curmudgeon) is an opera dramma giocoso in two acts by Vicente Martín y Soler. The Italian libretto by Lorenzo Da Ponte is based on the French comedy Le bourru bienfaisant by Carlo Goldoni.

== Background ==
The opera premiered on January 4, 1786 in Vienna at the Burgtheater with a cast that included three well known Viennese singers of the day: Nancy Storace as Angelica, Francesco Benucci as Ferramondo, and Maria Mandini as Marina. The opera premiered in the same year and at the same house as Mozart's Le nozze di Figaro, and both operas enjoyed revivals at the Burgtheater three years later – each boasting two new arias for new leading ladies. The new arias for Il burbero di buon cuore ("Chi sa, chi sa, qual sia" K. 582 in act 1 and "Vado, ma dove?" K. 583 in act 2, both for Lucilla) were actually composed by Mozart, as Martín y Soler had left Vienna to work at the court of Catherine the Great in Saint Petersburg.

The opera received its first modern revival in 2007 at the Teatro Real in Madrid directed by Irina Brook, with Elena de la Merced (Angelica), Véronique Gens (Lucilla), Cecilia Díaz (Marina), Saimir Pirgu (Giocondo), Juan Francisco Gatell (Valerio), Carlos Chausson (Ferramondo), and Luca Pisaroni (Dorval) conducted by Christophe Rousset, a performance of which was videotaped live and released on DVD in 2009.

== Roles ==
Roles, voice types, premiere cast
Role	Voice type	Premiere cast
Angelica	soprano	Nancy Storace
Castagna	baritone	
Cavalier Giocondo	tenor	
Madama Lucilla	soprano	Louise Villeneuve
Marina	contralto	Maria Mandini
Dorval	bass	
Ferramondo	bass	Francesco Benucci
Valerio	tenor	

== Synopsis ==
Ferramondo, a rich, bad-tempered old man, lives in his grand home with his niece and nephew, Angelica (who has a lover, Valerio) and Giocondo (married to Lucilla). Lucilla has spent most of Giocondo's money on jewelry and clothes, and cannot therefore provide a dowry for Angelica to wed Valerio. To get around this Giocondo decides that Angelica should enter a convent, but she wants to get married, although she doesn't tell her brother that she has chosen Valerio as her husband. Ferramondo agrees to her marriage. Giocondo visits Dorval, a friend of Ferramondo and explains his financial difficulties, and his decision about Angelica becoming a nun. Ferramondo decides that if Angelica is keen to be married rather than enter the convent, Dorval can be her husband. Ferramondo agrees to meet the cost of the dowry and the three men agree the course of action. Angelica is naturally upset, then Ferramondo begins to suspect the place of Valerio with Angelique and is furious. Lucilla calms matters but the first act nonetheless ends in confusion.

In act 2 Ferramondo retains his suspicions of Valerio and Angelica. Giocondo receives a letter about his debts, which leads Lucilla to understand that her profligancy has ruined them and prevented Angelica and Valerio's marriage. Valerio tells Angelica that as he has enough money, he can wed her without a dowry. Dorval tries present himself in a good light to Angelica but realizes her feelings and agrees not to go ahead, thus infuriating Ferramondo even more. Giocondo admits to Ferramondo that Lucilla has run through their money, his sister's dowry is impossible, and eventually Ferramondo comes round to agreeing to help out, but not before Lucilla faints. Finally Ferramondo agrees that Lucilla can stay in the house, he will pay the dowry, and all ends happily.
