= François Beaumavielle =

French opera singer

François Beaumavielle (died 1688, Paris) was a French operatic bass-baritone.

Trained in Toulouse, he was engaged at the Académie Royale de Musique in Paris by Pierre Perrin and Robert Cambert, where he created their opera Pomone in 1671.

He went on creating all the first roles within his vocal range, then known as "basse-taille", in the operas by Jean-Baptiste Lully notably; Cadmus in Cadmus et Hermione, le Temps in Atys, Jupiter in Isis, Phinée in Persée, etc.

A singer with a powerful voice and a consummate actor, he was sometimes criticised for over-emphasis.

== Sources ==
- Le guide de l'opéra, R. Mancini & J.J. Rouvereux, (Fayard, 1986) ISBN 2-213-01563-5
