= Bellérophon =

Opera by Jean-Baptiste Lully

- Opera by Jean-Baptiste Lully
- Cover of the score
- Librettist: Thomas Corneille; Bernard le Bovier de Fontenelle
- Language: French
- Based on: Hesiod's Theogony
- Premiere: 31 January 1679; Théâtre du Palais-Royal, Paris

Bellérophon is an opera with music by Jean-Baptiste Lully and a libretto by Thomas Corneille and Bernard le Bovier de Fontenelle first performed by the Opéra at the Théâtre du Palais-Royal in Paris on 31 January 1679.

The libretto is based on Hesiod's Theogony. The opera played for nine months and was one of Lully's greatest successes.

== Roles ==
Cast	Voice type	Premiere, 31 January 1679 (Conductor: - )
Apollon (prologue)	bass	François Beaumavielle
Pan (prologue)	baritone	Arnoul
Bacchus (prologue)	tenor	Roy
Bellérophon	haute-contre	Bernard Clédière
Sténobée	soprano	Mlle Saint-Christophle
Philonoé	soprano	Marie Aubry
Argie	mezzo-soprano	Bony
Pallas	mezzo-soprano	de La Prée
Jobate	baritone	Jean Gaye
Amisodar	bass	Nouveau
Pythie	tenor	Roy
Sacrificial priest	bass	Pulvigny

== Synopsis ==
The queen Sténobée (soprano), spurned by Bellérophon (tenor) who loves the princess Philonoé (soprano), has the magician Amisodar (bass) turn the garden into a barren desert and summon a chimera which terrorizes the country of Lycia. Apollo (tenor) appears and all is solved.

== Modern performances ==
The first performance in modern times was by Les Talens Lyriques conducted by Christophe Rousset at the Festival of Beaune, 24 July 2010. It was followed by a two performances in Paris, the first of which was recorded and released in 2011 by the record label Aparté.

== Recording ==
- Bellérophon Cyril Auvity, Ingrid Perruche, Céline Scheen, Les Talens Lyriques, conducted by Christophe Rousset (Aparté, 2 CDs, 2011)

== Sources ==
- Casaglia, Gherardo (2005). "Bellérophon". L'Almanacco di Gherardo Casaglia (in Italian).
- The New Grove French Baroque Masters, ed. Graham Sadler (Macmillan, 1986)
- The Viking Opera Guide ed. Holden (Viking, 1993)
- Le magazine de l'opéra baroque by Jean-Claude Brenac (in French)
