= Véronique Gens =

French operatic soprano (born 1966)

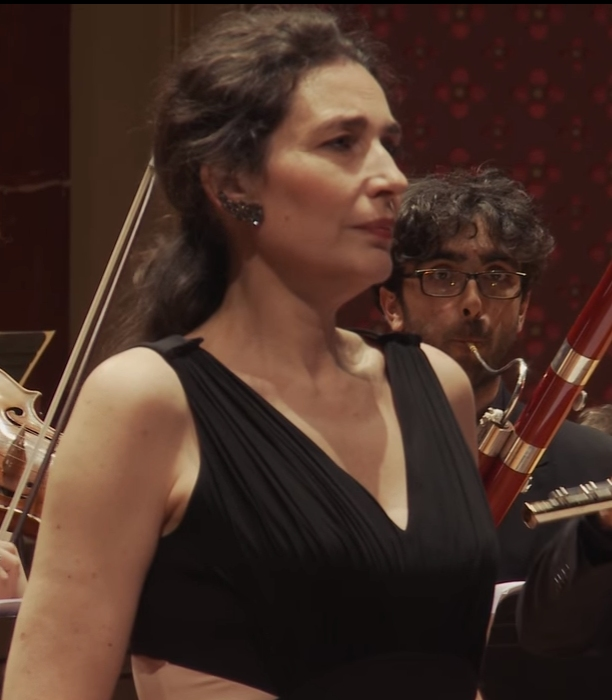
- Véronique Gens in 2015
- Born: 19 April 1966 (age 60); Orléans, France
- Education: Conservatoire de Paris
- Occupation: Opera singer (soprano)

Véronique Gens (born 19 April 1966) is a French operatic soprano. She has spent much of her career recording and performing Baroque music.

Gens was born in Orléans, France, and studied at the Conservatoire de Paris, winning first prize at the school. Her debut in 1986 was with William Christie and his Les Arts Florissants. She has since worked with Marc Minkowski, René Jacobs, Christophe Rousset, Philippe Herreweghe, Martin Gester, and Jean-Claude Malgoire.

While she started out as a Baroque specialist, Gens has also come into demand for roles in Mozart operas, and as an interpreter of songs by Berlioz, Debussy (see also Beau Soir), Fauré and others. Her numerous recordings include many works by Mozart and Purcell, as well as Joseph Canteloube's Chants d'Auvergne and Berlioz's Nuits d'été.

== Recordings ==
- Marc-Antoine Charpentier : Le Massacre des Innocents H.411, Super flumina Babylonis H.170, Psaumes de David H .215, H.216, H.220, H.221, Gratiarum actiones ex sacris… H.326, La Symphonie du Marais, Ensemble Vocal Contrepoint, conducted by Olivier Schneebeli. CD Adda 1990
- Marc-Antoine Charpentier : Office des Ténèbres, H.95, H.92, H.112, H.93, H.119, H.95, H.134, Miserere H.157, Noémi Rime, Le Parlement de musique, Martin Gester (organ, harpsichord and conducting). CD Opus 111 (1991)
- Jean-Sébastien Bach : Messe en si, Collegium Vocale Gent, dir. Philippe Herreweghe
- Jean Philippe Rameau, Hippolyte et Aricie, avec Jean-Paul Fouchécourt, Véronique Gens, Bernarda Fink, Russell Smythe, Thérèse Feighan, Annick Massis, Laurent Naouri, Florence Katz, Luc Coadou, M. Hall, Monique Simon, Jean-Louis Georgel, K. Okada, S. Van Dyck, Jean-Louis Meunier, Jacques-François Loiseleur des Longchamps, Jérôme Varnier, l'Ensemble vocal Sagittarius et Les Musiciens du Louvre conducted by Marc Minkowski : Deutsch Grammophon Archiv 4458532, ℗ 1994)
- Reynaldo Hahn, Henri Duparc, Ernest Chausson with piano accompanist Susan Manoff, on Alpha records, 2019.
- Berlioz: Les nuits d'été - La Mort de Cléopâtre, direction: Louis Langrée
- Nuit d'étoiles: mélodies de Fauré, Debussy, Poulenc. Avec Roger Vignoles (piano)
- Galuppi: Motets, Il Seminario Musicale, Gérard Lesne
- Mozart: Così fan tutte, Concerto Köln, direction: René Jacobs
- Mozart: Le nozze di Figaro, Concerto Köln, direction: René Jacobs
- Tragédiennes (récital, airs extraits d'œuvres de Lully, Rameau, Gluck…): Les Talens Lyriques, direction: Christophe Rousset. Virgin Classics
- Tragédiennes 2 (récital, airs extraits d'œuvres de Gluck à Berlioz): Les Talens Lyriques, direction: Christophe Rousset. Virgin Classics
- Handel: Agrippina, direction : J. C. Malgoire, la Grande Ecurie et la Chambre du Roy, enregistrement réalisé au Théâtre Municipal de Tourcoing, mars 2003
- Tragédiennes 3, airs d'opéras de Gluck à Verdi. Avec Les Talens Lyriques & Christophe Rousset. Virgin Classics, 2011
- Visions Münchner Rundfunkorchester, Hervé Niquet Alpha 2017
- "Charpentier - Médée" with Le Concert spirituel - Hervé Niquet (conductor), Vèronique Gens, Mèdèe, Cyrille Dubois, Jason, Thomas Doliè, Crèon, Judith Wanroij, Crèuse, David Witczak, Oronte. 3 CD Alpha, recorded in 2023
- Franz Lehár - La Veuve Joyeuse (The Merry Widow) (2006)
