= Daniel Danielis =

Belgian composer

Daniel Danielis (Visé near Liège 1635- Vannes 1696) was a Belgian composer. He studied at Maastricht and was organist at Saint Lambert's Church. Between 1661 and 1681 he served as Kapellmeister at the court of Mecklenburg-Güstrow. In 1684 he became maître de musique at Vannes Cathedral.

== Works, editions and recordings ==
Surviving works include 72 petits motets, several of them preserved by composer and collector Sébastien de Brossard, another 12 in a collection by Philidor. 54 of these motets are for 1 or 2 voices. A full catalogue of his works was published by Catherine Cessac, of the CMBV, in 2003.

Recordings

- Motets for one or two voices - including Caelo rores. Adjuro vos. Cognoscam. O Dulcissime. Jesu dulcissime. Quid reminiscimini Adoro te meo salus. Dic mihi o bone Jesu. Jesu mi. O alme vindex criminum. Mellon, Collot, Terakado, Malgoire, Uemura. dir. Christophe Rousset 1993 (Koch Schwann 3–1031)
- Motets d’Uppsala - 11 motets, including Paratum cor meum. Inter flammas amoris. Françoise Masset, Stephanie Revidat, Jean-François Novelli, Jérôme Corréas. Rousset 1997 (Cypres Records)
- Caeleste convivium - motets including Propter nimiam charitatem. Ornate aras. O bonitas, o amor! Ad arma fideles. Obstupescite omnes. O ! o salutaris hostia!. Ad fontes amoris. Venite ed videte. Super flumina Babylonis. Ad gaudia cœli. Quo tendimus mortales. Ensemble Pierre Robert, Frédéric Desenclos. Alpha 2008
