= Christophe Rousset =

French harpsichordist and conductor

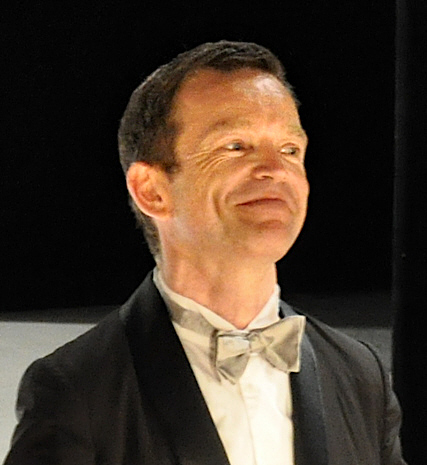
- Rousset in 2012
- Born: 12 April 1961 (age 65); Avignon, France
- Education: Schola Cantorum de Paris; Royal Conservatory of The Hague
- Occupations: Harpsichordist; Conductor
- Organizations: Les Talens Lyriques
- Awards: Legion of Honour; Ordre des Arts et des Lettres; Ordre national du Mérite

Christophe Rousset (French: [ʁusɛ]; born 12 April 1961) is a French harpsichordist and conductor, who specializes in the performance of Baroque music on period instruments. He is also a musicologist, particularly of opera and European music of the 17th and 18th centuries and is the founder of the French music ensemble Les Talens Lyriques.

== Biography ==
Rousset was born in Avignon, France on 12 April 1961. He studied harpsichord at La Schola Cantorum de Paris with Huguette Dreyfus, and subsequently at the Royal Conservatory of The Hague with Bob van Asperen winning the prestigious First Prize in the 7th Bruges Harpsichord Competition at the age of 22. This was followed by the creation of his own ensemble, Les Talens Lyriques, in 1991. At the heart of the ensemble is Rousset's research and expertise across the music of the Baroque, Classical and early Romantic periods.

Having initially attracted the notice of the international press and record companies for his proficiency as a harpsichordist, he thereafter made his mark as a gifted conductor, with invitations to perform with his ensemble at venues throughout the world, including among them Paris Opera, De Nederlandse Opera, Théâtre des Champs-Élysées, Salle Pleyel, Opéra de Lausanne, Teatro Real, Theater an der Wien, Opéra Royal de Versailles, Théâtre Royal de la Monnaie, Barbican Centre, Carnegie Hall, Concertgebouw Amsterdam, the Aix-en-Provence and Beaune festivals.

Alongside this, he has continued to pursue an active career as harpsichordist and chamber musician, performing and recording on the most beautiful period instruments. His complete performances of the works for harpsichord by François Couperin, Jean-Philippe Rameau, d'Anglebert and Forqueray and various recordings of pieces by Johann Sebastian Bach (Partitas, Goldberg Variations, Concertos for harpsichord, English Suites, French Suites and the Klavierbüchlein), are considered to be landmark references. His most recent album, devoted to a musical monument by the German Cantor, Book II of The Well-Tempered Clavier (on Aparté)—recorded at the Château of Versailles on a harpsichord by Joannes Ruckers (1628)—has won numerous awards, including a "Choc" from Classica magazine and "CD of the Week" from BBC Radio 3. In addition, instruments from the collection of the Museum of Music in Paris, have been entrusted to him for the recording of three records devoted to Royer, Rameau and Froberger.

Teaching is also of major importance for Christophe Rousset, who conducts and organises master classes and academies for young people (Accademia Musicale Chigiana in Siena, CNSMD Paris, Académie d'Ambronay, Orchestre Français des Jeunes Baroques, Jeune Orchestre Atlantique, Junge Deutsche Philharmonie, the Britten-Pears Orchestra). He works alongside the musicians of Les Talens Lyriques, to introduce young secondary school pupils in Paris to music.

Rousset also has enjoyed a career as guest conductor with Liceu Barcelona, Teatro San Carlo Naples, Teatro alla Scala, Royal Opera of Wallonia, Orquesta Nacional de España, London's Royal Opera House, Orchestra of the age of Enlightenment among other orchestras, and has actively pursued musical research, producing critical editions and the publication in 2007, by Actes Sud, of a study on Rameau.

Christophe Rousset has been awarded the French honours of Chevalier of the Legion of Honour, Commandeur in the Ordre des Arts et des Lettres and Chevalier in the Ordre national du Mérite.

== Recordings ==
=== As a harpsichordist ===
- Johann Sebastian Bach, Double Concertos, 1982 – L'Oiseau Lyre
- Luigi Boccherini, Quatuor pour deux clavecins, 1986 – Harmonia Mundi
- Jean-Philippe Rameau, Intégrale des Pièces de clavecin, 1991 – L'Oiseau Lyre
- Johann Sebastian Bach, Italian Concerto BWV 971, French Overture BWV 831, Chromatic Fantazy & Fugue BWV 903, 1992 – L'Oiseau Lyre
- Johann Jakob Froberger, Suites et Toccatas, 1992 – Harmonia Mundi
- François Couperin, Troisième Livre de Pièces de Clavecin, 1993 – Harmonia Mundi
- Wilhelm Friedemann Bach, Pièces pour clavecin seul, 1993 – Harmonia Mundi
- Pancrace Royer, Pièces de clavecin, 1993 – L'Oiseau Lyre
- Johann Sebastian Bach, Partitas BWV 825–830, 1993 – L'Oiseau Lyre
- François Couperin, Quatrième Livre de Pièces de Clavecin, 1994 – Harmonia Mundi
- François Couperin, Deuxième Livre de Pièces de Clavecin, 1994 – Harmonia Mundi
- Johann Sebastian Bach, Goldberg Variations, 1995 – L'Oiseau Lyre
- Gaspard Le Roux, Intégrale des pièces de clavecin, 1995 – L'Oiseau Lyre
- François Couperin, Premier Livre de Pièces de Clavecin, 1995 – Harmonia Mundi
- Johann Sebastian Bach, Concertos pour clavecins et orchestre BWV1053, 1055, 1058, 1995 – L'Oiseau Lyre
- Franz Xaver Richter, Flötenmusik, Takashi Ogawa – RBM, 1996
- Wilhelm Friedemann Bach, Douze Polonaises, 1996 – Veritas/Virgin
- François Couperin, Intégrale Pièces de clavecin (1–4 Livres), 1996 – Harmonia Mundi
- Johann Sebastian Bach, Concertos pour clavecins et orchestre BWV1052, 1054, 1056, 1042, 1997 – L'Oiseau Lyre
- Johann Sebastian Bach, Intégrale des concertos pour clavecin, 1998 – Decca
- Domenico Scarlatti, Sonates pour Clavecin, 1998 – Decca
- Jean-Henri d'Anglebert, Intégrale des pièces de clavecin, 2000 – Decca
- Antoine Forqueray, Pièces de clavecin, 2001 – Decca
- Johann Sebastian Bach, Suites Anglaises, 2003 – Naïve-Ambroisie-Astrée
- Johann Sebastian Bach, Suites Françaises, 2004 – Naïve-Ambroisie-Astrée
- Johann Sebastian Bach, Klavierbuchlein fürWilhem Friedemann, 2005 – Naïve-Ambroisie-Astrée
- Pancrace Royer, Pancrace Royer, 2008 – Naïve-Ambroisie-Astrée
- Jean-Philippe Rameau, Les Indes Galantes, 2009 – Naïve-Ambroisie-Astrée
- Johann Jakob Froberger, Johann Jakob Froberger, 2010 – 2-Astrée
- Louis Couperin, Louis Couperin, 2010 – Aparté
- Johann Sebastian Bach, Bach Fantasy, 2010 – Aparté
- Jean-Philippe Rameau & Louis Marchand, Marchand, Rameau, 2012 – Ambronay Editions
- Jacques Duphly, Jacques Duphly, 2012 – Aparté
- Johann Sebastian Bach, Das Wohltemperierte Klavier The Well-Tempered Clavier, volume 2, 2013 – Aparté
- Claude-Bénigne Balbastre, Pièces de clavecin livre I, 2017 – Aparté
- Armand-Louis Couperin, Pièces de clavecin, 2017 – Aparté
- François Couperin, Première et deuxième suite pour viole, 2018 – Aparté
- Louis Couperin, Nouvelles suites, 2018 – Harmonia Mundi
- Girolamo Frescobaldi, Toaccate e partite, 2019 – Aparté
- Marin Marais, Pièces de viole Livre I, 2020 – Aparté
- Le manuscrit de Madame Théobon, 2020 – Aparté

=== As a conductor ===
==== Operas ====
- Scipione (George Frideric Handel), 1993 – Fnac / 2010 – Aparté
- Armida abbandonata (Niccolò Jommelli), 1994 – Fnac / 2005 – Ambroisie
- L'incoronazione di Poppea (Claudio Monteverdi), 1994 – TV : NPS/ 2005 – DVD : Opus Arte
- Riccardo Primo (Handel), 1996 – L'Oiseau-Lyre
- Les fêtes de Paphos (Jean-Joseph Cassanéa de Mondonville), 1997 – L'Oiseau-Lyre
- Mitridate, re di Ponto (Wolfgang Amadeus Mozart), 1999 – Decca
- Antigona (Tommaso Traetta), 2000 – L'Oiseau-Lyre
- Serse (Handel), 2000 – TV / 2005 – DVD : TDK
- Persée (Jean-Baptiste Lully), 2001 – Astrée Naïve
- La capricciosa corretta (Vicente Martín y Soler), 2004 – Naïve Astrée
- Roland (Lully), 2004 – Ambroisie
- La grotta di Trofonio (Antonio Salieri), 2005 – CD (with bonus making of DVD) Ambroisie
- Philémon & Baucis (Le feste d'Apollo) (Christoph Willibald Gluck), 2006 – Ambroisie-Naïve-Astrée
- Zoroastre (Jean-Philippe Rameau), 2006 – TV / 2007 – DVD : Opus Arte
- Il burbero di buon cuore (Martín y Soler), 2007 – TV / 2009 – DVD : Dynamic / 2010 : CD : Dynamic
- Vénus & Adonis (Henry Desmarest), 2007 – Ambroisie-Naïve
- Il Califfo di Bagdad (Manuel Garcia), 2007 – Archiv Produktion (Donwroad only)
- Il tutore burlato (Martín y Soler), 2007 – L'Oiseau-Lyre (Spain only)
- Les grandes eaux musicales de Versailles (Lully, Rameau, Gluck, Desmarest), 2008 – CD : Ambroisie
- Castor & Pollux (Rameau, 2008 – DVD : Opus Arte
- Bellérophon (Lully), 2011 – Aparté
- Médée (Luigi Cherubini), 2012 – DVD/Blu-ray Bel Air Classiques
- Hercule mourant (Antoine Dauvergne), 2012 – Aparté
- Renaud (Antonio Sacchini), 2013 – Palazzetto Bru Zane
- Phaëton (Lully), 2013 – Aparté
- Amadis (Lully), 2014 – Aparté
- Les Danaïdes (Salieri), 2015 – Palazzetto Bru Zane
- L'affaire Tailleferre, Quatre opéras bouffes (Germaine Tailleferre), 2015 – DVD : Canopé Éditions
- Zaïs (Rameau), 2015 – CD Aparté
- Les Indes galantes (Rameau), 2015 – DVD : Alpha
- Alcina & Tamerlano (Handel), 2015 – Web Streaming / 2016 – Blu-ray : Wahoo
- Uthal (Étienne-Nicolas Méhul), 2015 – Web Radio / 2017 – Palazzetto Bru Zane
- Armide (Lully), 2015 – Aparté
- Pygmalion (Rameau), 2017 – Aparté
- Alceste (Lully), 2017 – Aparté
- Les Horaces (Salieri), 2018 – Aparté
- Tarare (Salieri), 2019 – Aparté
- Faust (Gounod), 2019 – Palazzetto Bru Zane
- Isis (Lully), 2019 – Aparté
- La Morte d'Orfeo (Landi), 2020 – DVD : Naxos
- Armida (Salieri), 2021 – Aparté
- Psyché (opera) (Lully), 2023 – Château de Versailles Spectacles

==== Vocal ====
- Henry Du Mont, Motets en dialogue, 1992 – Fnac Music / re-release : Virgin Veritas
- Pascal Collasse, Cantiques spirituels de Jean Racine, 1993 – Fnac Music
- François Couperin, Motets, 1993 – Fnac Music
- Daniel Danielis, Motets, 1993 – Koch Schwann
- Farinelli, Il castrato, Original soundtrack (Handel, Riccardo Broschi, Porpora, Johann Adolph Hasse, Pergolesi), 1994 – Astrée-Auvidis / Re-release : Naïve
- Farinelli – A portrait, live in Bergen/Ann Hallenberg, Haendel Riccardo Broschi, Giacomelli, Porpora, Johann Adolph Hasse, Leonardo Leo 2016 – Aparté
- Daniel Danielis, Motets d'Uppsala, 1997 – Cyprès
- Roberto Scaltriti (bariton) : Amadeus & Vienna (Mozart, Haydn, Soler, Cimarosa, Salieri, Giuseppe Gazzaniga, Sarti), 1998 – Decca
- Giovanni Battista Pergolesi, Stabat Mater – Salve Regina, 1999 – Decca
- Giovanni Battista Pergolesi, Stabat Mater, 2020 – Outhere
- François Couperin, Leçons de ténèbres, Motets, Magnificat, 2000 – Decca
- Leonardo Leo, Miserere – Musique sacrée, 2002 – Decca
- María Bayo (soprano) : Arias de Zarzuela barroca (José de Nebra, Antonio Rodríguez de Hita, Martín y Soler), 2003 – Naïve
- Sandrine Piau (soprano) : Handel Opera seria, 2004 – Naïve
- Wolfgang Amadeus Mozart, Betulia liberata, 2019 – Aparté
- Véronique Gens (soprano) : Tragédiennes, de Lully à Gluck, 2006 – Virgin
- Sandrine Piau : Mozart Airs sacrés, 2006 – DVD : Armide classics
- Joyce DiDonato (mezzo-soprano) : Furore, Handel Opera Arias, 2008 – Virgin Classics
- Véronique Gens : Tragédiennes 2, de Gluck à Berlioz, 2009 – Virgin Classics
- Véronique Gens : Tragédiennes 3, Héroïnes romantiques (Méhul, Rodolphe Kreutzer, Salieri, Gluck, Gossec, Meyerbeer, Auguste Mermet, Berlioz, Saint-Saëns, Massenet, Verdi), 2011 – Virgin Classics
- François Couperin, Couperin et moi, 2018 – Aparté
- Jean-Baptiste Lully, Ballet royal de la Naissance de Vénus, 2021 – Aparté
- Marc-Antoine Charpentier, In nativitatem Domini Canticum H.416, Messe de minuit H.9, Noëls sur les instruments H.531 & H.534, Monteverdi Choir, English Baroque Solists, conducted by Christophe Rousset, CD Monteverdi productions 2025

==== Instrumental ====
- Jean-Marie Leclair, Ouvertures et sonates en trio, 1993 – Fnac Music
- Lully, Campra, Marin Marais, André Cardinal Destouches, Jacques Cordier, Musiques à danser à la cour et à l'opéra, 1995 – Erato
- Jean-Philippe Rameau, Ouvertures, 1997 – Decca
- François Couperin, Les goûts réunis, 2001 – Decca
- Jean-Philippe Rameau, Six concerts en sextuor, 2003 – Decca
- François Couperin, Les Nations, 2018 – Aparté
- François Couperin, Couperin et moi, 2018 – Aparté
- François Couperin, Concerts Royaux, 2018 – Aparté

== Merits and awards ==
- 1983—Was awarded first prize at the 7th International Harpsichord Competition at Bruges
- 1993—Was awarded the "Diapason d'Or" for his interpretation of Royer's Pièces de Clavecin.
- 1995—Received the "Award for 17th and 18th Century Chamber/Solo Instrumental Music" at the Cannes Classical Awards for his recording of the Bach Partitas.
- 2004—Received the "médaille de Chevalier dans l'Ordre national du Mérite" from the France's Minister of Culture, Donnedieu de Vabres.
- 2013—Received the Traetta Prize from the Traetta Society for his work in the rediscovery of the roots of European music.
