= Phaëton (Lully) =

Opera by Jean-Baptiste Lully

- Opera by Jean-Baptiste Lully
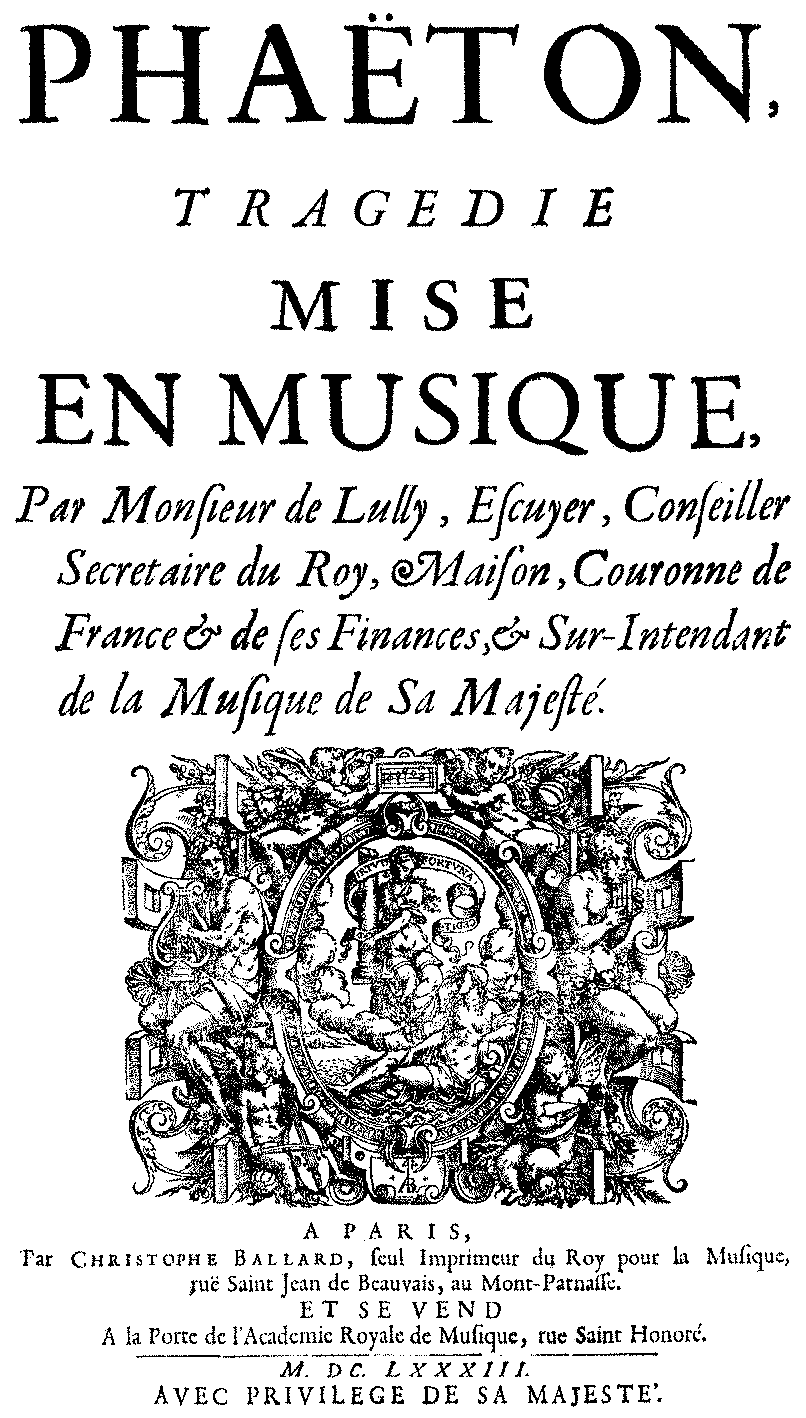
- Title page of the libretto
- Librettist: Philippe Quinault
- Language: French
- Based on: Ovid's Metamorphoses
- Premiere: 6 January 1683; Palace of Versailles

Phaëton (LWV 61) is a tragédie en musique in a prologue and five acts by Jean-Baptiste Lully. Philippe Quinault wrote the French libretto after a story from Ovid's Metamorphoses. It can be read as an allegorical depiction of the punishment awaiting those mortals who dare to raise themselves as high as the "sun" (i.e. the Sun King).

Phaëton was the first lyric tragedy of Lully and Quinault to receive its world premiere at the Palace of Versailles, where it was given without stage machinery on or about 6 January 1683. The Paris Opera also performed it at the Théâtre du Palais-Royal (beginning on 27 April), where it was very successful with the general public. The performances ceased for thirty days of mourning following the death of the queen on 30 July 1683, but resumed thereafter and continued until 12 or 13 January 1684. The opera was revived at the Palais-Royal in 1692, 1702, 1710, 1721, 1730, and 1742. It was sometimes referred to as "the people's opera", just as Lully's Isis came to be called "the musician's opera" (because of its score), and his Atys, as "the king's opera" (one of Louis XIV's favorite works).

== Roles ==
Role	Description	Voice type	Premiere cast, c. 6 January 1683
Prologue
Astrée	Astraea, a goddess.	soprano	Fanchon Moreau
Saturne	Saturn, a god from a former age.	bass	?
Companions of Astraea; Followers of Saturn and Astraea
Tragedy
Libie	Libya, daughter of Merops by his first wife	soprano	?
Théone	Theona, daughter of Proteus, Phaëton's lover.	soprano	?
Phaëton	the son of Clymene and the Sun.	haute-contre (high tenor)	Louis Gaulard Dumesny
Climène	Clymene, daughter of Oceanus, second wife of Merops.	soprano	?
Protée	Proteus, a sea god, Triton's herdsman.	bass	?
Triton	a sea god, brother of Clymene.	haute-contre	Claude Desvoyes
Épaphus	a son of Jupiter, Libya's lover.	bass	?
Mérops	king of Egypt	bass	?
Un roi Éthiopien	a king from Ethiopia	bass	?
Un roi Indien	a king from India	bass	?
Une des Heures du jour	an Hour of the day	soprano	?
L'Automne	Autumn, a god	bass	?
Le Soleil	the Sun, a god	haute-contre	?
Une bergère Égyptienne	An Egyptian shepherdess	soprano	?
La Terre	the Earth, a goddess	haute-contre	Claude Desvoyes
Jupiter	king of the gods	bass	?
Followers of Triton; Kings and Tributaries of Merops; Egyptians, Ethiopians, Indians; followers of Phaëton; Priestesses; Worshippers of Isis; Furies; Hours of the Day; Four Seasons

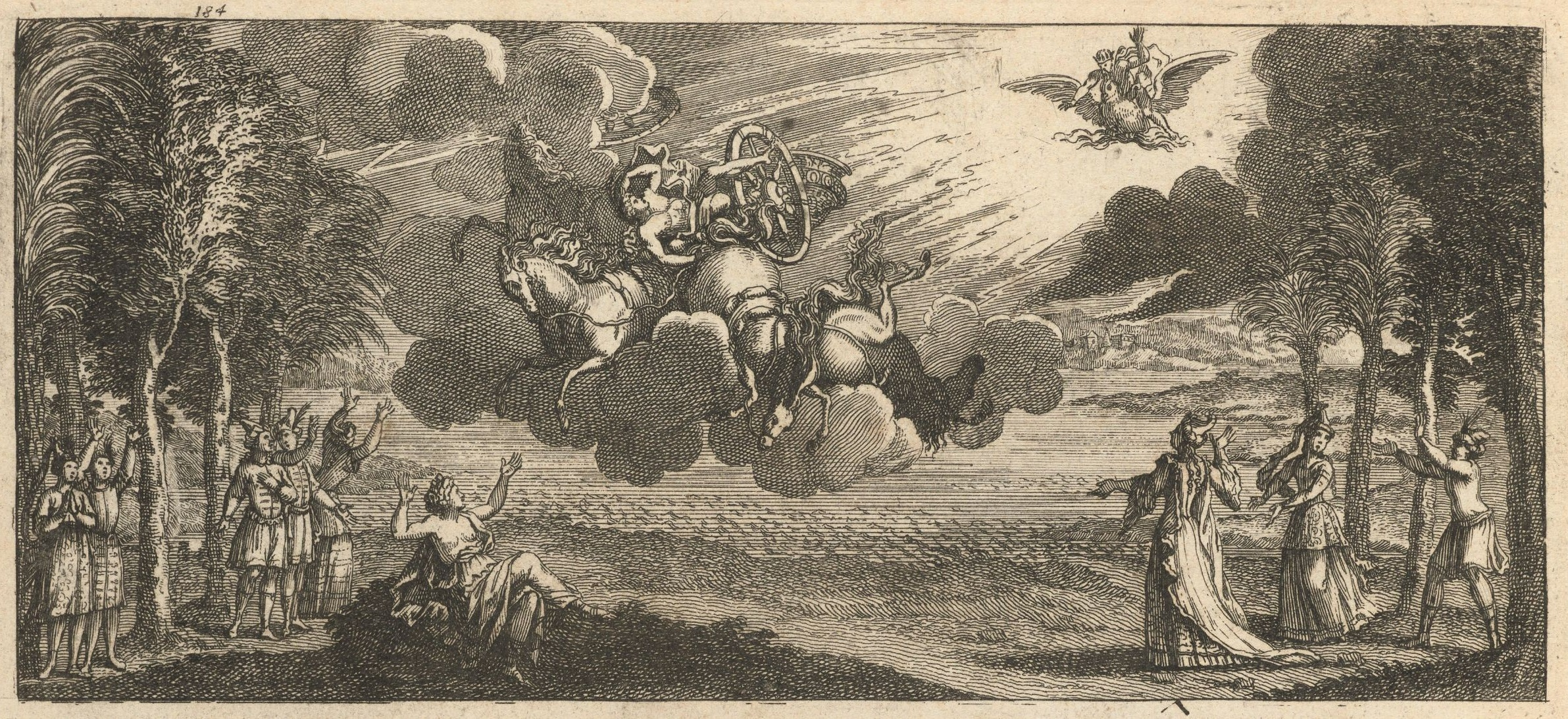
1709 illustration for Phaëton

== Synopsis ==
Phaëton, the prideful and reckless son of the Sun and the ocean nymph Clymene, is driven to abandon his lover Theona by his ambition for the hand of Libya, daughter of the king of Egypt. On the day of the wedding, Libya's enraged lover Epaphus, himself the son of Jupiter, disputes Phaëton's claim to divine lineage. Desiring to prove himself, Phaëton convinces his father to allow him to drive the sun-chariot for one day. In the course of his flight he loses control of the horses, threatening the earth beneath with fiery destruction; Epaphus entreats his father to put an end to the danger, and Jupiter strikes the chariot down with a thunderbolt. Phaëton falls to his death.

== Recordings ==
- Lully: Phaéton / Marc Minkowski, Les Musiciens du Louvre. Erato (1993). Catalogue# 91737 (2 CDs)
- Christophe Rousset Aparté, 2 CDs, 2011
