= Persée (Lully) =

Opera by Jean-Baptiste Lully

- Opera by Jean-Baptiste Lully
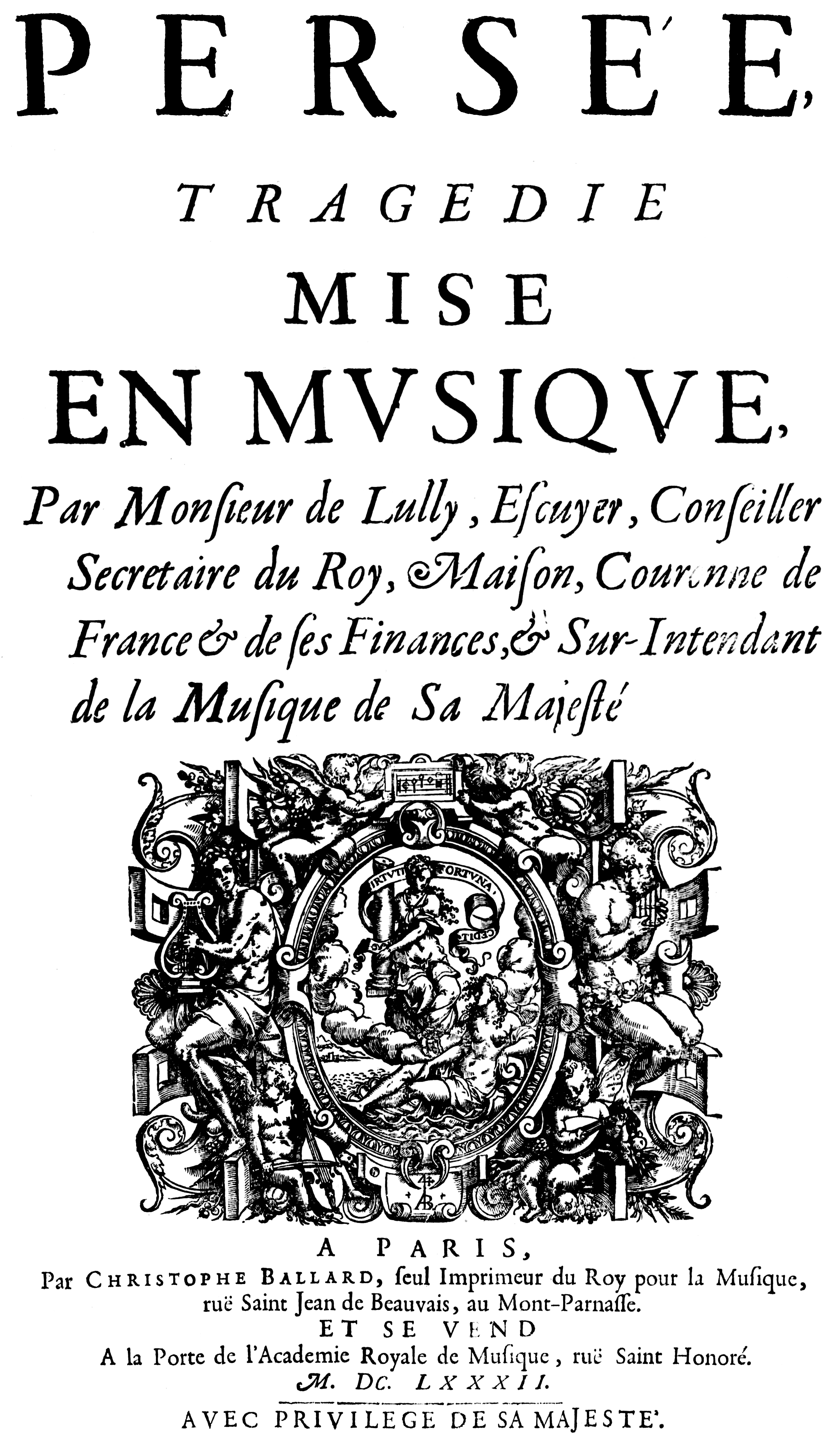
- Cover of the score
- Librettist: Philippe Quinault
- Language: French
- Premiere: 18 April 1682; Théâtre du Palais-Royal, Paris

Persée (Perseus) is a tragédie lyrique with music by Jean-Baptiste Lully and a libretto by Philippe Quinault, first performed on 18 April 1682 by the Opéra at the Théâtre du Palais-Royal in Paris.

== Roles ==
Role	Voice type	Premiere cast, 18 April 1682
Persée son of Jupiter and Danaë	haute-contre	Louis Gaulard Dumesny
Andromède daughter of Céphée	soprano	Marie Aubry
Phinée, brother of Céphée	bass	François Beaumavielle
Mérope, sister of Cassiope	soprano	Marie Le Rochois
Phronime, attendant of Virtue	tenor (taille)	
Mégathyme, attendant of Virtue	haute-contre	
Virtue	soprano	
Fortune	soprano	
Céphée, King of Ethiopia	bass	
Cassiope, Queen of Ethiopia	soprano	Mlle Saint-Christophle
Amphimédon, an Ethiopian	baritone	
Corite, an Ethiopian	haute-contre	
Proténor, an Ethiopian	baritone	
A Cyclope	baritone	
A warrior Nymph	soprano	
An infernal deity	bass	
Mercure	haute-contre	
Méduse, a Gorgon	tenor (taille)	Claude Desvoyes
Euryale, a Gorgon	haute-contre	
Sténone, a Gorgon	bass	
Idas, a courtier of Céphée's	bass	
High priest of Hymenée (wedding priest)	tenor (taille)	
Vénus	soprano	
L'Amour (Cupid)	soprano	
Hymenée (Marriage)	soprano	
A Triton	bass	
Ethiopians (Act 4)	haute-contre, tenor (taille)	
Followers of Virtue and Fortune, followers of Cassiope, young persons chosen for the games, spectators, warrior nymphs, infernal deities, phantoms, Ethiopians, Tritons and Nereides, victorious heroes (chorus/ballet)

== Synopsis ==
=== ACT I: The Palace of King Céphée and Queen Cassiope of Ethiopia ===
King Céphée expresses the terror his people feel for the snake-haired Mèduse: anyone who looks on her turns to stone. The goddess Juno has sent Mèduse to punish Queen Cassiope for her insolence in comparing her own beauty to that of the goddess. In an effort to appease Juno's wrath, Cassiope has prepared a celebration of games in her honour. We learn that Mérope, the queen's sister, secretly loves Persée. However, Persée loves and is loved by Andromède, the king's daughter. Andromède is betrothed to Phinée, her uncle, who, in an agony of jealousy, accuses her of not returning his love, suspecting that she loves another. Andromède assures him that she will fulfil her duty to love him. As the act ends, we learn that Juno has rejected the sacrifices made in her honour. Messengers arrive with the terrible news that Mèduse has taken more victims.

=== ACT II: The Palace Gardens ===
Céphée announces that Persée will fight Mèduse to free Ethiopia of her terror; if successful, he is to have Andromède as his own. Phinée is outraged. Andromède and Mérope confess their mutual love for Persée and pray for his safe return. As Andromède and Persée say farewell, she cannot keep herself from confessing that she loves only him. Mercure assures Persée of the assistance of all the gods (except Juno). A troupe of Cyclops brings Persée a sword forged by Vulcan, Warrior Nymphs bring Pallas's diamond shield, and Fiery Spirits from the underworld present him with the helmet of Pluto.

=== ACT III: The dwelling of the Gorgons ===
Once a beautiful woman renowned for her gorgeous hair, Mèduse tells how she was turned into a snake-haired monster by the hand of the goddess Minerva, who was jealous of her. Mercure casts a sleeping spell over Mèduse and the Gorgons, who try but cannot resist the spell. Using Minerva's shield as a mirror to avoid gazing on Mèduse, Persée beheads her. Using Pluto's helmet to make himself invisible, Persée flees the wrath of the remaining Gorgons, carrying Mèduse's head.

=== ACT IV: A rocky seacoast in Ethiopia ===
The Ethiopians are celebrating and awaiting the victorious Persée on a rocky seacoast. A storm arises, and the sailor Idas enters to announce that the furious Juno, along with Neptune, is determined to sacrifice Andromède to a sea monster. Phinée says that he would rather see Andromède dead than in the arms of his rival, confessing that love has died in his heart. Before the despairing eyes of the king, the Tritons chain Andromède to a rock. At the last moment, Persée flies toward the approaching monster and kills it. The storm ends and the Ethiopians celebrate victory.

=== ACT V: A reception room prepared for the wedding of Persée and Andromède ===
A devastated Mérope longs for death, then is joined by Phinée. The two conspire to take revenge on Persée with the help of Juno. As the High Priest begins the wedding ceremony, however, Mérope repents of her treachery and warns Persée that Phinée's assassins are approaching. The wedding guests flee. In the ensuing battle, Mérope is struck by an arrow and killed. With the help of Juno, the battle goes in Phinée's favour; however, Persée uses the Gorgon's head to turn his enemy to stone.

The scene changes to Venus' palace. Venus descends from the heavens to announce that Juno is appeased and the Ethiopians can now live in peace. While Céphée, Cassiope, Persée and Andromède hover on Mercure's wings, the Ethiopians celebrate with dancing and singing.

== Releases ==
=== DVD ===
A 2004 production by Opera Atelier performed live at the Elgin Theatre under the direction of Marshall Pynkoski and conducted by Hervé Niquet in Toronto is the first home video release of the opera. It features Cyril Auvity (Persée), Marie Lenormand (Andromeda), Stephanie Novacek (Cassiope), Monica Whicher (Mérope), Olivier Laquerre (Céphée/Méduse (the latter transposed from F to E-flat)), Alain Coulombe (Phinée), and Colin Ainsworth (Mercure). The designer was Gérard Gauci and the choreographer was Jeannette Zingg. Marc Stone directed the television production.

== Sources ==
- Original libretto: Persée, Tragedie representée par l'Academie Royale de Musique le dix-septième Avril 1682, Paris, Ballard, 1682 (accessible for free online at Gallica - BNF)
- Printed Score: Persée, Tragedie mise en musique, par Monsieur de Lully, Escuyer, ..., Paris, Ballard, 1682 (accessible for free onlite at Gallica - BNF)
- The New Grove French Baroque Masters, ed. Graham Sadler (Macmillan, 1986)
- The Viking Opera Guide ed. Holden (Viking, 1993)
- Parvopassu, Clelia Persée, in Gelli, Piero & Poletti, Filippo (ed), Dizionario dell'opera 2008, Milan, Baldini Castoldi Dalai, 2007, pp. 1008-1009
- Le magazine de l'opéra baroque by Jean-Claude Brenac (in French)

== See also ==
- List of operas based on the Andromeda myth
