= Isis (Lully) =

Opera by Jean-Baptiste Lully

- Opera by Jean-Baptiste Lully
- Title page of the score
- Librettist: Philippe Quinault
- Language: French
- Based on: Ovid's Metamorphoses
- Premiere: 5 January 1677; Saint-Germain-en-Laye

Isis is a French opera (tragédie en musique) in a prologue and five acts with music by Jean-Baptiste Lully and a libretto by Philippe Quinault, based on Ovid's Metamorphoses. The fifth of Lully's collaborations with Quinault, it was first performed on 5 January 1677 before the royal court of Louis XIV at the Château de Saint-Germain-en-Laye and in August received a run of public performances at the Théâtre du Palais-Royal. It was Lully's first published score (partbooks in 1677); a full score was published in 1719.

== Performance history ==
Isis was revived only once during the remaining 38 years of Louis XIV's reign, on 14 February 1704. It was revived again in 1717–1718 and 1732–1733.

== Roles ==
Role	Voice type	Premiere cast 5 January 1677
Prologue
Fame	soprano	Marie Verdier
Neptune	bass	M Forestier
First Triton	taille (baritenor)	Louis Gaulard Dumesny
Second Triton	haute-contre	M Nouveau
Apollo	haute-contre	Dominique de La Grille,
Clio		M Regnier
Calliope	soprano	Mlle Des Fronteaux
Melpomene	soprano	Mlle Caillot
Thalia	soprano	Mlle Piesche
Urania		M Datys
Erato	flutist (dessus de flûte)	M Philbert
Euterpe	flutist (dessus de flûte)	M Piesche
Terpsicore	violinist (dessus de violon)	M Favre
Polymnie	violinist (dessus de violon)	M Joubert
Acts 1–5
Hierax	baritone	Jean Gaye
Pirante	haute-contre	François Langeais
Io / Isis	soprano	Marie Aubry
Mycene	soprano	Mlle Sainte-Colombe
Mercury	haute-contre	Bernard Clédière
Jupiter	bass	François Beaumavielle
Iris	soprano	Mlle Beaucreux
Juno	soprano	Mlle Saint-Christophe
Hebe	soprano	Marie-Madeleine Brigogne
Argus	baritone	Antoine Morel
A nymph representing Syrinx	soprano	Mlle Verdier
A sylvan representing Pan	bass	M. Godonesche
A Fury	haute-contre	Benoît-Hyacinthe Ribon
First Fate	soprano	Mlle Bony
Second Fate	haute-contre	François Langeais
Third Fate	bass	M Forestier

The ballets were danced by Pierre Beauchamp, Louis Pécourt, Magny, and Boutteville.

== Synopsis ==
=== Prologue ===
The prologue, which includes the usual paean to Louis XIV, takes place in the palace of Fame (La Renommée) with Rumors (Rumeurs) and Noises (Bruits) dancing in attendance to the goddess. When Fame sings of "the glory and triumphant valor of the greatest of heroes," she is referring to Louis XIV. She is visited by Apollo with his retinue of Muses, who arrive from the sky, and Neptune with his retinue of Tritons, who arrive from the sea. Both groups are equipped with violins, lutes, and trumpets. When Neptune sings of the conqueror's recent adventures at sea, he is referring to the French naval victory over the Dutch and Spanish in 1676 in the Franco-Dutch War.

=== Acts 1–5 ===
The plot of the tragedy of Isis is loosely adapted from one of the episodes in Ovid's Metamorphoses. Its plot parallels that of Lully's previous opera, Atys (in which Sangaride, promised to Celoenus, is pursued by another and acquires a goddess as a rival). Isis centers around the god Jupiter's love for the nymph Io and the jealousy of Juno.

Io, daughter of Inachus, is promised in marriage to Hierax, but is pursued by Jupiter, and yields to this love in spite of her feelings of guilt.

Juno has Io imprisoned and tortured, leading Io to cry out to Jupiter for help. He swears faithfulness to Juno if she will spare Io, and Juno turns Io into a goddess: Isis, the Egyptian goddess.

== Scandal ==
Lully's contemporaries interpreted this story as representing the volatile situation between two of the King's mistresses. The character of Io was equated with Madame de Ludres, Louis XIV's new favorite at court, to whom he had given lavish gifts. His long-time mistress, Madame de Montespan, "was furious and did everything she could to humiliate her." The subsequent scandale of the premiere ended the collaboration between Lully and Quinault for a time, and led to the dismissal of a number of members of Lully's artistic circle.

== Recordings ==
- Isis Soloists, La Simphonie du Marais, conducted by Hugo Reyne (Accord, 3 CDs, 2005)
- Isis Soloists, Les Talens Lyriques, conducted by Christophe Rousset (Aparte, 2 CDs, 2019)
