= Philippe Quinault =

French dramatist and librettist

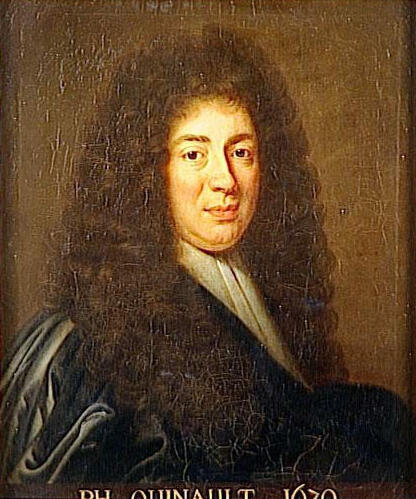
Philippe Quinault

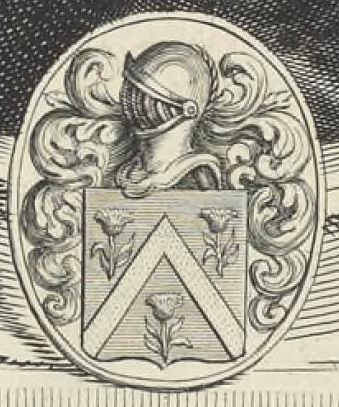
Coat of arms – Philippe Quinault

Philippe Quinault (French: [kino]; 3 June 1635 – 26 November 1688) was a French dramatist and librettist.

== Biography ==
Quinault was born in Paris. He was educated by the liberality of François Tristan l'Hermite, the author of Marianne. Quinault's first play was produced at the Hôtel de Bourgogne in 1653, when he was only eighteen. The piece succeeded, and Quinault followed it up, but he also read for the bar; and in 1660, when he married a widow with money, he bought himself a place in the Cour des Comptes. Then he tried tragedies (Agrippa, etc.) with more success.

He received one of the literary pensions then recently established, and was elected to the Académie française in 1670. Up to this time he had written some sixteen or seventeen comedies, tragedies, and tragi-comedies, which began at the Hôtel de Bourgogne in 1653, and of which the tragedies were mostly of very small value and the tragi-comedies of little more. But his comedies—especially his first piece Les Rivales (1653), L'Amant indiscret (1654), which has some likeness to Molière's Étourdi, Le Fantôme amoureux (1659), and La Mère coquette (1665), perhaps the best—are much better. In assessing Quinault's comedy work, Patricia Howard noted the influence of Préciosité, especially in the female roles: "For if in French theatre in the second half of the century, women's roles are preeminent, it was the précieux movement which made them so." In 1671 he contributed to the singular miscellany of Psyché, in which Pierre Corneille and Molière also had a hand, and which was set to the music of Jean-Baptiste Lully.

Here he showed a faculty for lyrical drama, and from this time until just before his death he confined himself to composing libretti for Lully's work. This was not only very profitable (for he is said to have received four thousand livres for each, which was much more than was usually paid even for tragedy), but it established Quinault's reputation as the master of a new style—so that even Boileau, who had previously satirized his dramatic work, praised, not the opera, which he did not like, but Quinault's remarkably ingenious and artist-like work in it.

His libretti are among the very few which are readable without the music, and which are yet carefully adapted to it. The very artificiality of the French lyric of the later 17th century, and its resemblance to alexandrines cut into lengths, were aids to Quinault in arranging lyrical dialogue. They certainly do not contain very exalted poetry or very perfect drama. But they are quite free from the ludicrous doggerel which has made the name libretto a byword, and they have quite enough dramatic merit to carry the reader, much more the spectator, along with them. It is not an exaggeration to say that Quinault, coming at the exact time when opera became fashionable out of Italy, had very much to do with establishing it as a permanent European genre. His first piece after Psyché (1671) was a kind of classical masque, Les Fêtes de l'Amour et de Bacchus (1672). Then came Cadmus et Hermione (1674), Alceste ou le Triomphe d'Alcide (1674), Thésée (1675), Atys (1676), and Isis (1677). Alceste was received very negatively by some critics, and this inspired a debate of published opinions by the writers Jean Racine and Charles Perrault which constitutes one of the first exchanges in what would later become known as the Quarrel of the Ancients and the Moderns.

All these were classical in subject, and so was Proserpine (1680). The Triumph of Love (1681) is a ballet, but in Persée (1682) and Phaëton (1683) Quinault returned to the classical opera. Then he finally deserted it for romantic subjects, in which he was even more successful. Amadis de Gaule (1684) and Roland (1685) are arguably his masterpieces, although Armide (1686) is probably the best known opera. Lully died in 1687, and Quinault, his occupation gone, became devout, and began a poem called the "Destruction of Heresy". He died on 26 November 1688, in Paris. Among his less known works is the lyrical, theatrical drama "Bellerephon", in 2 parts: (one probably first published on 1671 and one probably first published on 1679), based on an ancient Greek myth.
