= Le Concert Spirituel =

French musical ensemble

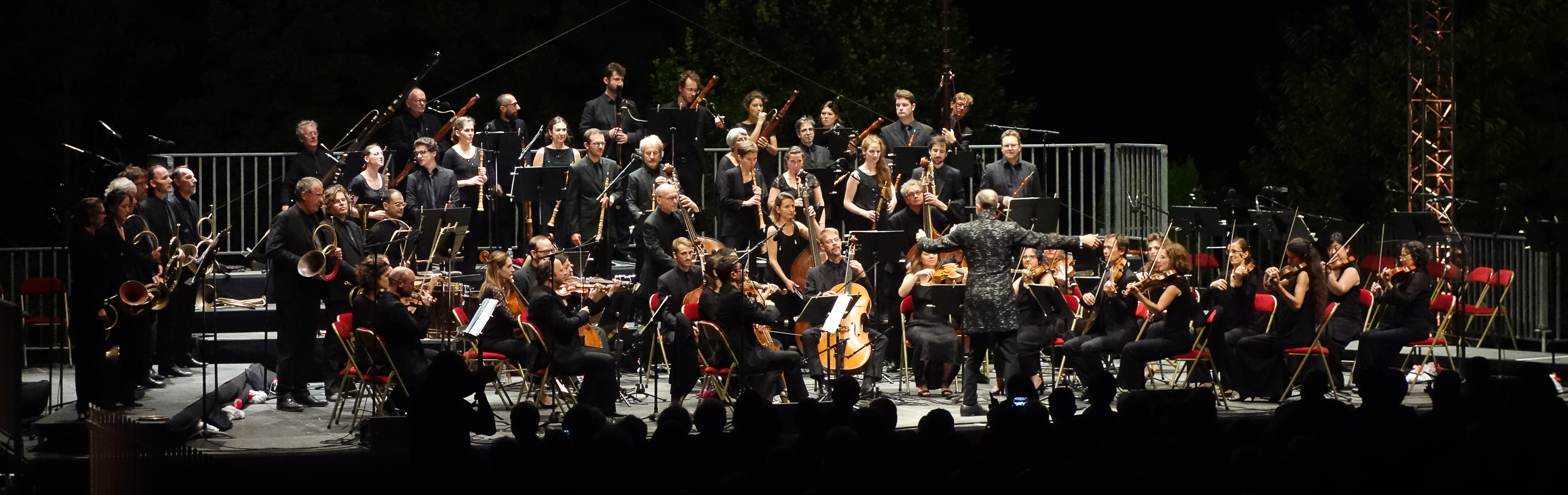
- In concert at the Château de Pupetières on 26 August 2017 as part of the Berlioz Festival
- Founded: 1987
- Principal conductor: Hervé Niquet
- Website: www.concertspirituel.com

Le Concert Spirituel is a French ensemble specialising in works of baroque music, played on period instruments. Founded by Hervé Niquet in 1987, it is named after the 18th-century concert series Concert Spirituel. The group performs internationally, playing mostly rarely performed sacred music and operas, and making recordings. Its focus is on French music played at the court of Versailles.

== History ==
The ensemble is named after Concert Spirituel, the first private concert society in France, founded in the 18th century and dissolved during the French Revolution. The ensemble was founded by Hervé Niquet in 1987, designed to revive the great works of the French repertoire played at the court of Versailles.

Le Concert Spirituel collaborates closely with the Centre de musique baroque de Versailles, with a focus on French composers such as Marc-Antoine Charpentier, Jean-Baptiste Lully, André Campra and Joseph Bodin de Boismortier.

Le Concert Spirituel often plays sacred music, and has also performed operas such as Daphnis et Chloé by Boismortier, Rameau's Pygmalion, Purcell's King Arthur and The Indian Queen, and Mozart's Don Giovanni. The ensemble "rediscovered" forgotten operas from the French repertoire, such as Callirhoé by André Cardinal Destouches, Lully's Proserpine, Sémélé by Marin Marais (chosen as "Opera Recording of the Year", Echo Klassik 2009), Guétry's Andromaque, Campra's Le carnaval de Venise and Catel's Sémiramis.

At a Proms concert in 2012 at the Royal Albert Hall in London, the ensemble played Handel's Water Music and the Music for the Royal Fireworks, with a large formation including 18 oboes, 9 trumpets and 9 trombones, and strings to match. This is an authentic band for the music, which was originally intended to be played in the open air.

Le Concert Spirituel is subsidised by the French Ministry of Culture and the city of Paris. It also receives financial support from the Mécénat Musical Société Générale and the Fondation Bru.

== Recordings ==
Le Concert Spirituel recorded for the Accord, Adda, Virgin and Naxos labels until 1999, and then exclusively for Glossa from 2000 to 2015. Since June 2015, Le Concert Spirituel has recorded exclusively for Alpha Classics.

=== Awards ===
Le Concert Spirituel received a 2001 Grammy Award nomination for its recording of Sérénades chez Marie Leczinska by Boismortier. Its recording of Striggio's 40 Voice Mass was also nominated for a Grammy Award in 2013.

Its recording of Grétry's Andromaque was awarded a "Chock" by Classica, a Diamant by Opéra Magazine, a Découverte by Diapason and the "Grand Prix du Disque" by the Académie Charles-Cros in 2010.

Its recording of Sémélé was chosen "Opera Recording of the Year" at the Echo Klassik Awards (2009); its recording of Campra's Le Carnaval de Venise won a "German Record Critics’ Award", a Classica magazine "Chock" and a Diamant from Opéra Magazine (2011); Lully's Persée also won a German Record Critics' Award (2017).

=== DVDs ===
- Boismortier, Don quichotte chez la duchesse, Staging: Gilles and Corinne Benizio, Production: Step by Step Productions, Château de Versailles, Le Concert Spirituel, Director: Louise Narboni (Alpha Classics – 2015)
- Alessandro Striggio, Messe à 40 voix. Les aventuriers de la messe perdue, GVD 921624, Production: Step by Step Productions, Director: Laurent Portes, Olivier Simonnet. (Glossa – 2011)
- Purcell, King Arthur, GVD 921619, Staging: Gilles and Corinne Benizio (alias Shirley and Dino)
- Charpentier, Médée H.491, Staging: Stéphanie d'Oustrac, Médée; François-Nicolas Geslot, Jason; Gaëlle Méchaly, Créuse; Bertrand Chuberre, Oronte; Renaud Delaigue, Créon; Hanna Bayodi, Caroline Mutel, Andres J. Dahlin, Emiliano Gonzalez Toro, Les Chantres du Centre de Musique Baroque de Versailles, Le Concert spirituel à l'Opéra royal du château de Versailles (3 October 2004), conducted by Hervé Niquet, directed by Olivier Simonet – 2 DVD Armide classics 2004.

=== Discography ===
Le Concert Spirituel has recorded the following:

- L'Opéra des opéras, 2019 Alpha Classics
- Orazio Benevolo, Missa si deus pro nobis, 2018 Alpha Classics
- George Frideric Handel, Messiah, 2017 Alpha Classics
- Jean-Baptiste Lully, Persée 1770, 2017 Alpha Classics
- Luigi Cherubini, Requiems de Cherubini & Plantade, 2016 Alpha Classics
- Antonio Vivaldi, Gloria & Magnificat, 2015 Alpha Classics
- Wolfgang Amadeus Mozart, Les Mystères d'Isis, 2015 Glossa GCD 921630
- Jean-Philippe Rameau, Les Fêtes de l'Hymen et de l'Amour, 2014, Glossa GES 921629-F
- Johann Christoph Vogel, La Toison d'or, 2013, Glossa GES 921628-F
- Louis Le Prince, Missa Macula non est in te, Marc-Antoine Charpentier, Motets H.306, H.341, H.245, H.299, H.75, (Ouverture H.536), Lully, O dulcissime Domine, 2013 – Glossa GCD 921627
- Charles-Simon Catel, Sémiramis, 2012, Glossa GES 921625-F
- Alessandro Striggio, Messe à 40 voix, 2012 Glossa GCDSA 921623
- André Campra, Le Carnaval de Venise, 2011 Glossa GES 921622-F
- Pierre Bouteiller, Requiem, 2010 Glossa GCD 921621
- André Grétry, Andromaque, 2010, Glossa GES 921620-F
- Marc-Antoine Charpentier, Missa Assumpta est Maria H.11 - Pour plusieurs martyrs H.361 - Symphonie pour un reposoir H.508, 1, 2, 5, – O salutaris Hostia H.262 - 2 Domine Salvum Fac Regem H.303 & H.291, 2008 - Glossa GCD 921617
- Joseph Bodin de Boismortier, Daphnis & Chloé, Glossa GCD 921618
- Marin-Marais, Sémélé, (world premiere recording), 2007, Glossa GES 921614-F
- Grandes eaux musicales 2007 du Château de Versailles, Le Concert Spirituel, Hervé Niquet, 2007 Glossa GCD 921613
- André Cardinal Destouches, Callirhoé, (world premiere), 2006, Glossa GES 921912-f
- Marc-Antoine Charpentier, Messe à 8 voix, 8 violons et flûtes H.3 – Domine Salvum Fac Regem H.283 – Te Deum à 8 voix, avec flûtes et violons H.145, 2006 Glossa GCD 921611
- Henry Desmarest, De Profundis, Veni Creator, Cum Invocarem, 2005 – Glossa GCD 921610
- Joseph Bodin de Boismortier, Sonates pour basses, 2004 – Glossa GCD 921609
- Henry Purcell, King Arthur, 2004 – Glossa GCD 921608
- Henry Desmarest, Te deum de Paris – Dominus Regnavit, 2003 – Glossa GCD 21607
- George Frideric Handel, Water Music – Fireworks, 2003 – Glossa GCD 921606
- Marc-Antoine Charpentier, (Coffret Charpentier) Te Deum H.146, H.547 & motets – Messe à 4 voix de Mr de Mauroy H.6 - Domine Salvum Fac Regem H.299 – 3 Leçons de Ténèbres H.135, H.136, H.137, 5 Méditations pour le Carème H,380, H.381, H.386. H.387, H.388, 2003 – Glossa GCD 98003
- Marc-Antoine Charpentier, Messe de Monsieur de Mauroy H.6 – Domine Salvum Fac Regem H.299, 2002– Glossa GCD 921602
- Marc-Antoine Charpentier, 3 Leçons de Ténèbres H.135, H.136, H.137 – 5 Méditations pour le Carème H.380, H.381, H.386, H.388, H.387, 2002 – Glossa GCD 921604
- Joseph Boismortier, Daphnis & Chloé, 2002 – Glossa GCD 921605
- Henry Purcell, Dido and Aeneas, 2001 – Glossa GCD 921601
- François d'Agincourt, Pièces d’orgue, 2001 – Glossa GCD 921701
- François d'Agincourt, Pièces de clavecin, 2001 – Glossa GCD 921702
- Marc-Antoine Charpentier, Te Deum H.146, H.547 – Motets H.202, H.365, H.291, 2001 – Glossa GCD 921603
- Joseph Bodin de Boismortier, Sérénade, concerto pour basson et pièces pour musette et vielle à roue, 1999 – Naxos 8.554.456/57
- Joseph Bodin de Boismortier, Le Triomphe d'Iris, 1998 – Naxos 8.554.455
- Paolo Lorenzani, Motets pour le Roy Louis XIV, 1997 – Naxos 8.553.648
- Joseph Michel, Leçons de Ténèbres, 1997 – Naxos 8.553.295
- Joseph Bodin de Boismortier, Ballets de Village et sérénade, 1997 – Naxos 8.553.296
- Louis-Nicola Clérambault, Pastorale, Le Triomphe d'Iris, 1998 - Naxos 8.554455F
- Louis-Nicolas Clérambault, Cantates pour soprano et basse, Orphée, Léandre et Héro, Sandrine Piau, soprano, 1996 – Naxos 8.553.744
- Louis-Nicolas Clérambault, Cantates, La Mort d'Hercule, Poliphème, Luc Coadou, basse, Syphonies II, III, V, VI, VII, 1996 – Naxos 8.553.743
- Robert de Visée et Francesco Corbetta, Pièces en contrepartie à deux guitares et deux théorbes, 1996 – Naxos 8.553.745
- Joseph Bodin de Boismortier, Don Quichotte chez la Duchesse, ballet comique en trois actes, 1996 – Naxos 8.553.647
- Joseph Bodin de Boismortier, Six Concerti à cinq flûtes traversières seules sans basse, 1995 – Naxos 8.553.639
- Orazio Benevolo, Messe et motets à double chœur, 1995 – Naxos 8.553.636
- Jean-Nicolas Geoffroy, Messe et Magnificat pour orgue et chœur, 1995 – Naxos 8.553.637
- Marc-Antoine Charpentier, "Vespers of the Blessed Virgin" H.221, H.149, H.216, H.150, H.210, H.60. H.72, H.24, 1995 – Naxos 8.553.174 (musique sacrée, vol.2)
- Marc-Antoine Charpentier, Messe des morts à 4 voix et continuo H.7 – Litanies de la Vierge H.89 – De profundis H.213 – Psaume 110 de David à 4 voix H.220 – Nisi Dominus à 4 voix H.160 & H.160 a – Élèvation à 5 H.251 – Laudate pueri H.203, 1994 – Naxos 8.553.173 (musique sacrée, vol.1)
- Marc-Antoine Charpentier, Messe H.1 – Te Deum à 4 voix H.147, Precatio pro Rege H.166, Élèvation H.275, Canticum Zachariae H.345, 1996 – Naxos 8.553.175 (musique sacrée, vol 3)
- Marc-Antoine Charpentier, "Motets pour la Chapelle de l'Hôtel de Guise" H.44, H.45, H.46, H.47, H.367, H.83, H.76, 1998 – Naxos 8.554.453 (musique sacrée, vol.4)
- Jean-Baptiste Lully, Grands motets vol. 3 : Benedictus, Notus in Judae, Exaudiat te, O dulcissime Jesu, Laudate pueri, Domine Salvum fac Regem, 1994 – Naxos 8.554.399
- Jean-Baptiste Lully, Grands motets vol. 2 : O Lachrymae, De Profundis, Dies irae, Quare fremuerunt, 1994 – Naxos 8.554.398
- Jean-Baptiste Lully, Grands motets vol. 1 : Te Deum, Miserere, Plaude LaetareGallia, 1993 – Naxos 8.554.397
- Jean-Philippe Rameau, Pigmalion, Le Temple de la Gloire (extraits), 1993 – Virgin Veritas 5 61539 2
- Jean-Philippe Rameau, Grands Motets, 1992 – Virgin Veritas 5 61526 2
- André Campra, Messe Ad Majorem Dei Gloriam et motets Cantate Domino, Deus noster Refugium, De Profundis, 1992 – Accord 465 934-2
- André Campra, Requiem, motet Benedictus Dominus, 1991 – Accord 472 236-2
- Joseph Bodin de Boismortier, Motet à grand chœur, motets à voix seule mêlés de symphonies, 1991 – Adda 240172
- André Campra, Te Deum, motets Notus in Judea Deus, Deus in Nomine tuo, 1990 - Adda 581250
- Gioachino Rossini, La cambiale di matrimonio, 1991 – Accord 476 058-2
- Jean Gilles, Te Deum, motet Diligam te Domine, 1990 – Accord 472 237-2
- Jean Gilles, Motet à St-Jean Baptiste, Trois Lamentations pour la Semaine Sainte, 1989 – Accord 465 926-2
- Jean Gilles, Requiem, motet Beatus quem elegisti, 1989 – Accord 465 924-2
