= Stéphanie de Virieu =

French painter and sculptor

Stéphanie de Virieu (14 July 1785 – 9 May 1873) was a French painter and sculptor. Some 3,000 of her works have been listed, many of them documenting historical events. A feminist ahead of her time, she saw the role of women as being to study and to learn.

== Biography ==
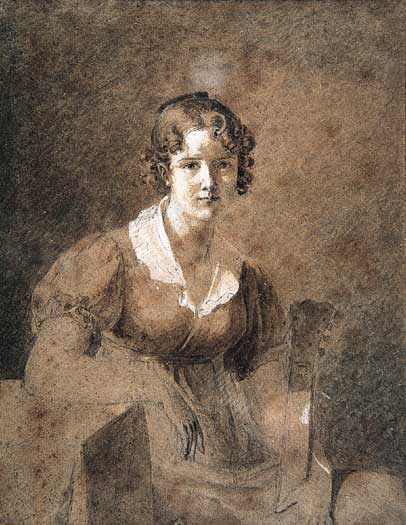
Stéphanie de Virieu, self-portrait (1810)

Born on 14 July 1785 in Saint-Mandé, Val de Marne, Stéphanie de Virieu was the daughter of François-Henri de Virieu, a nobleman, and Élisabeth Digeon de Monteton. Her father was killed on 9 October 1793 during the Siege of Lyon.

As their home, the Château de Pupetières in Châbons, Isère, was completely destroyed by the revolutionaries, in 1803 the family bought the Château de Lemps in Le Grand-Lemps. When she was 13, Stéphanie de Virieu was introduced to drawing by Lavoipierre, one of Jacques-Louis David's students, later continuing her studies under another of his students, Grégorius.

In the early 1820s, she made a lengthy study trip to Italy, examining works of art and taking painting lessons from the Italian masters. From September 1823 to February 1824, she stayed in Rome, Naples, Turin and Florence, bringing back many drawings and watercolours.

De Virieu painted portraits of her family and her friends, including Joseph de Maistre and Alphonse de Lamartine. She also had a carpentry shop where she created statues, pieces of furniture and religious decorations. When she was 78, she sculpted a fireplace decoration in stone, tracing the story of her 12th-century ancestors. Her last work, a sculpted series of the Stations of the Cross, is to be found in the Church of Poudenas.

Stéphanie de Virieu died in Poudenas on 9 May 1873 in the home of her mother's family.
