= Château de Pupetières =

French castle

Coordinates: 45.4595°N 5.4546°E

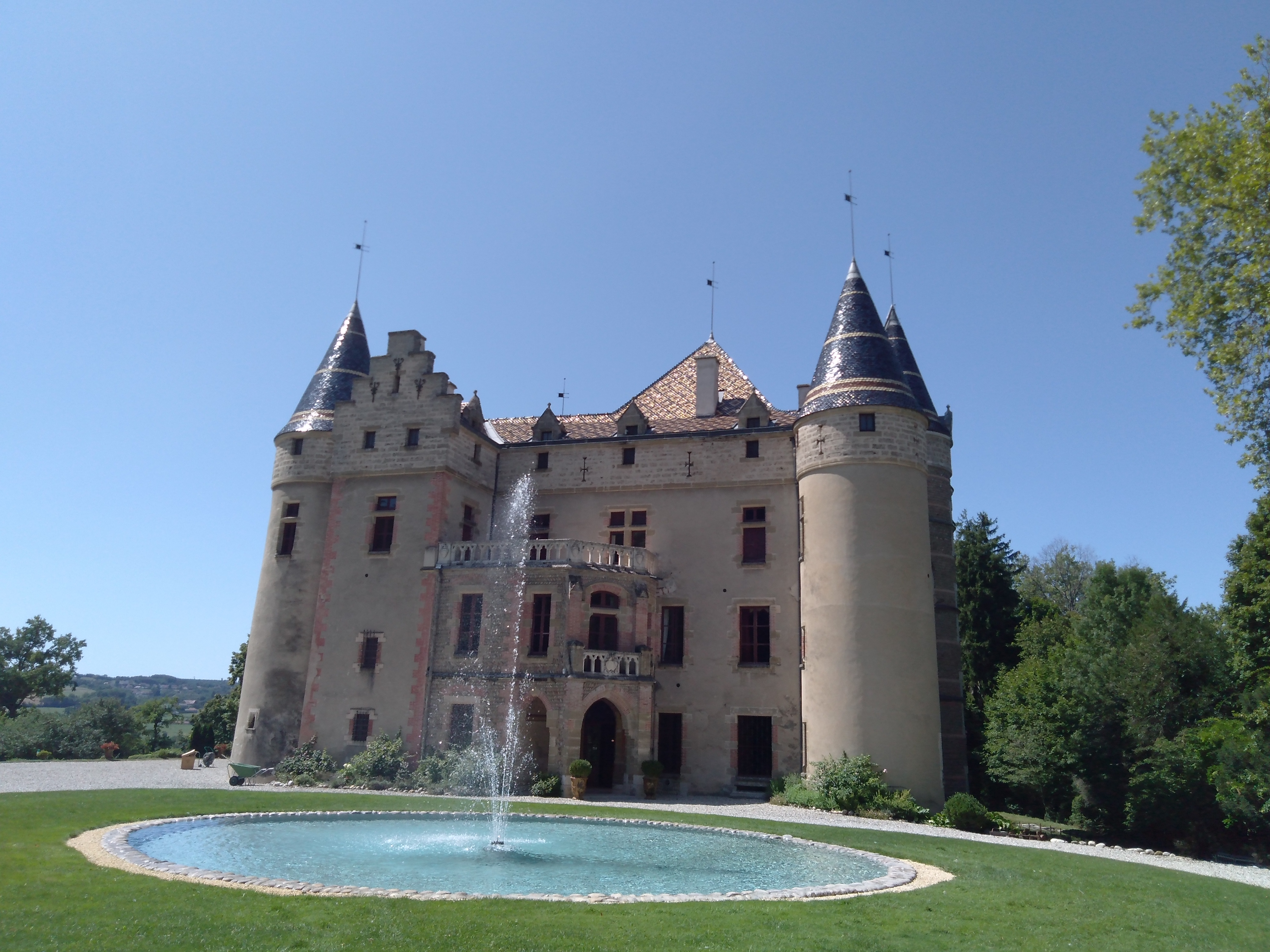
Château de Pupetières in August 2019

The château de Pupetières is a 19th-century castle which stands in the commune of Chabons, in the Isère department and the Auvergne-Rhône-Alpes region, in France.

The famille de Virieu has owned the estate since the 13th century, when the primitive castle, then a simple fortified house, was built. Between 1861 and 1866, Alphonse de Virieu, son of Aymon, decided to entrust the reconstruction of Pupetières to two architects: Denis Darcy, for the outbuildings, and Eugène Viollet-le-Duc, for the castle in a neo-Gothic style.

The estate of Pupetières is also linked to the stay of the poet Alphonse de Lamartine, who wrote one of his most famous works of romantic inspiration entitled Le Vallon, which in turn inspired Countess Anna de Noailles.

The castle and its outbuildings were classified as a historical monument by a decree of 8 November 1972. The private property, park and building are open to visitors, but the opening hours and entrance fees are set by the owner.

== Location ==
Pupetières Castle is located in the northern part of the French department of Isère, on the territory of the commune of Chabons, in the Canton of Le Grand-Lemps.

Dominating the valley of the Bourbre, but slightly below the "Vallon de Lamartine" and the "Combe Férouillat", which separates it from the former chartreuse de la Sylve-Bénite, the building stands less than 3 kilometres (1.9 mi) from the small town of Virieu, which is home to another listed castle in Chabons, also a listed castle in Virieu, as well as 15 kilometres (9.3 mi) from Voiron, the most important town in its geographical area (calculated distances as the crow flies).

== History ==
Virieu-Pupetières coat of arms

=== From the Middle Ages to the Revolution ===
In 1222, a branch of the Virieu family built the first castle, which was the centre of the seigneury of Châbons. Originally it was only a fortified house where the Virieu family lived until the French Revolution. During the revolutionary period, the castle was completely devastated and burned down.

At that time the family property was confiscated, and the Virieus had to move near Geneva, Switzerland, where another branch of their family was established.

=== Contemporary era ===
On her return in 1805, the Countess de Virieu found only three ruined towers of her old fortified house, which had been looted and burned during the Revolution.

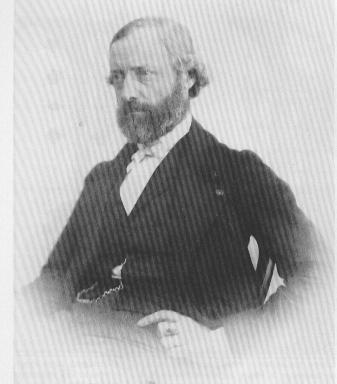
Eugène Viollet-le-Duc

She decided to buy back her land from the Grand-Lemps, Montrevel and Pupetières, and it was her grandson Alphonse who entrusted the reconstruction of the castle to Eugène Viollet-le-Duc a few years later (around 1861). (Note: Viollet-le-Duc, French architect, is known to the general public for his restoration of medieval buildings and in particular the restoration of the Cathedral of Notre-Dame de Paris, Cité de Carcassonne and the Château de Roquetaillade) He would be assisted by the architect Denis Darcy.

According to an article published in Le Dauphiné libéré, more than 45 different tile models were needed to create the roof. At the end of work, a new castle had been built in the heart of the estate, in accordance with the idea that its author had of his work of "restoration":

Restoring a building is not maintaining, repairing or rebuilding it, it is restoring it to a complete state that may never have existed at any given time.

In its columns devoted to world news, the newspaper Le Matin (10 July 1899) wrote that

the Marquis and Marquise de Virieu née de Noailles have just settled in the castle of Pupetières, where they will spend the week....

indicating a certain notability of this family and its castle.

== Description ==
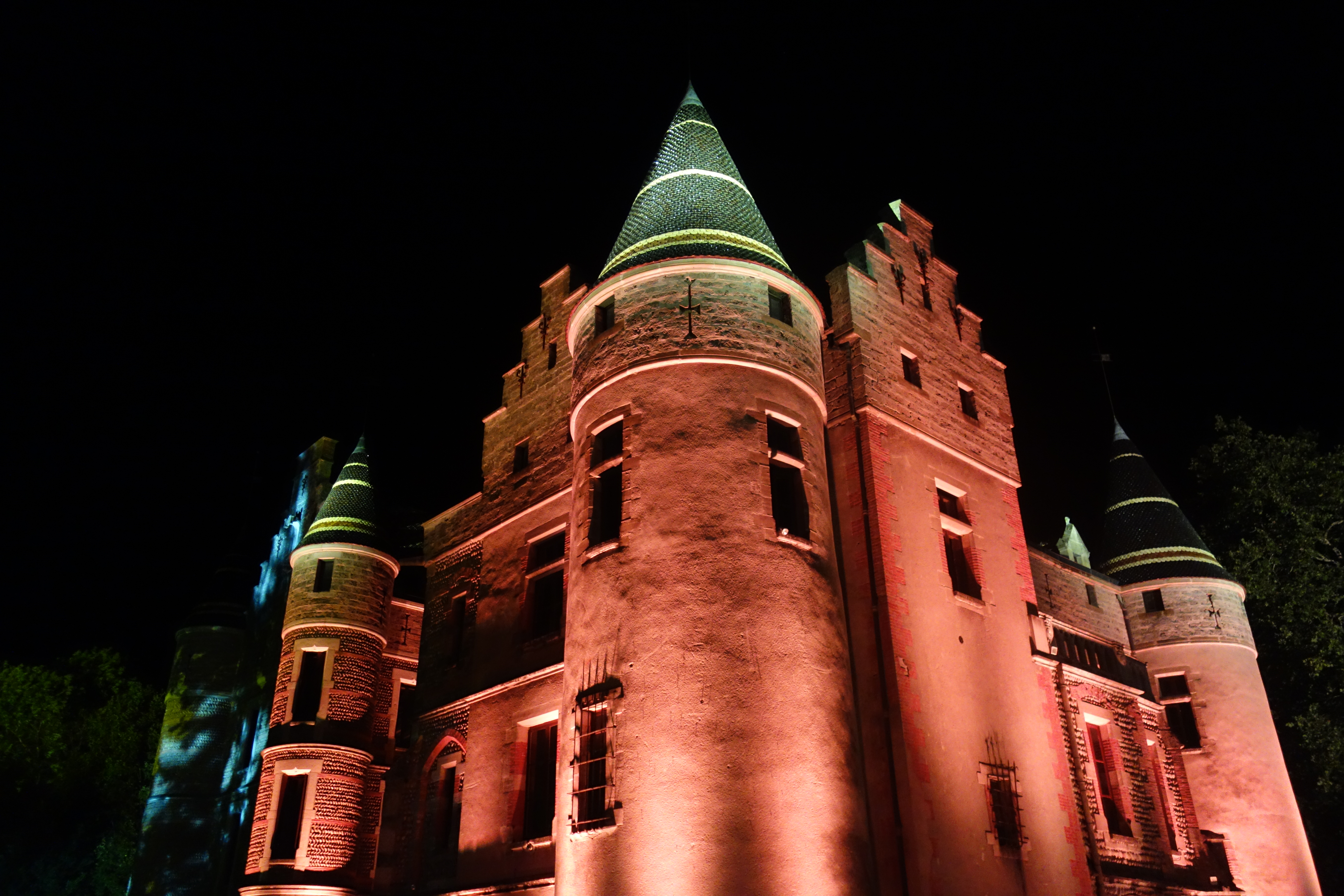
Illumination of the Château de Pupetières during the concert of Le Concert Spirituel as part of the Berlioz Festival in 2017

The following is an excerpt from a text written by Stéphanie de Virieu, a French painter and sculptor and daughter of François-Henri de Virieu, describing the castle and its estate in 1859 (the year before its restoration):

It (the castle) was neither beautiful nor very large. What I liked better were the numerous and picturesque outbuildings with an old tower against the stables. What I liked most of all was the water. For living, clear water ran everywhere [...] The water came down from the valley and out into the courtyard in a bubbling cascade whose song was uninterrupted. The whole thing ended with a cabbage and lettuce garden which started from the path of arrival. It was so steep that it always took several horses to hoist a carriage to the front of the castle.

In the Mercure de France, the reader can discover another description of the castle, signed by Paul Berret and published on 1 August 1933:

Pupetières was completed in 1862 by Viollet-le-Duc; today it erects its medieval towers at the mouth of the valley which it hides from the eyes of those passing by; its architecture is too new with its pink and white stones and its slender towers...

The elements protected as historical monuments are the facades and roofs of the castle and the outbuildings, and the following rooms with their decoration: vestibule, staircase with its wrought-iron banister, dining room, large lounge with its fireplace, library including book cupboards on two floors, the ceremonial room known as the Duchess of Noailles' bedroom with its fireplace and the bedroom of Queen Esther.

=== Exterior appearance ===
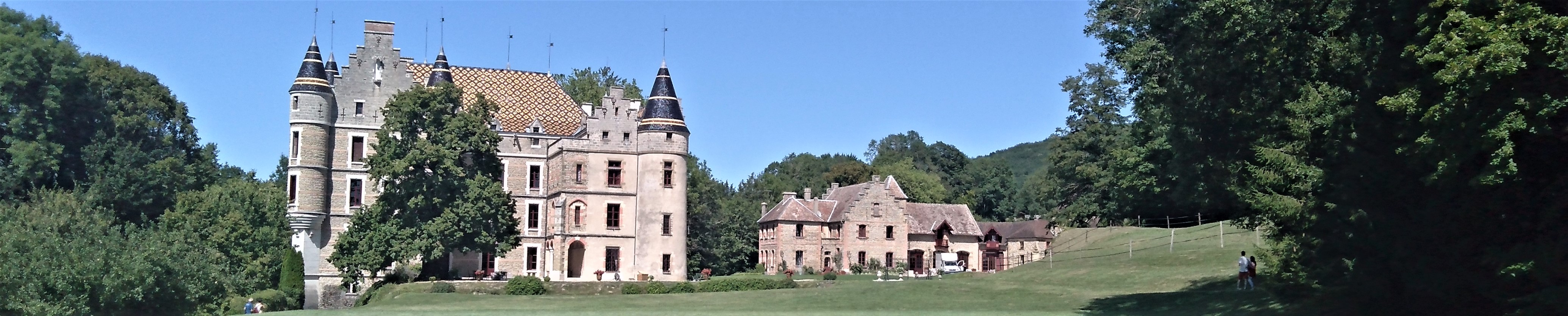

The castle is a fine example of 19th century neo-gothic architecture in the department of Isère. With a surface area of 7500 m^{2}, different building materials were used for its reconstruction in 1861. Thus the stone walls, alongside those of brick, and pebbles in pesci. A projecting, hexagonal-shaped forebody, adorned with a balustrade, marks the entrance.

The seven towers, topped in turrets, and the main building are covered with glazed scaly tiles that highlight the multiple offsets of the roofs of the castle.

The outbuildings (former stables and servants' quarters), also renovated, are located near the monumental entrance where visitors are also welcomed.

=== Interior appearance ===
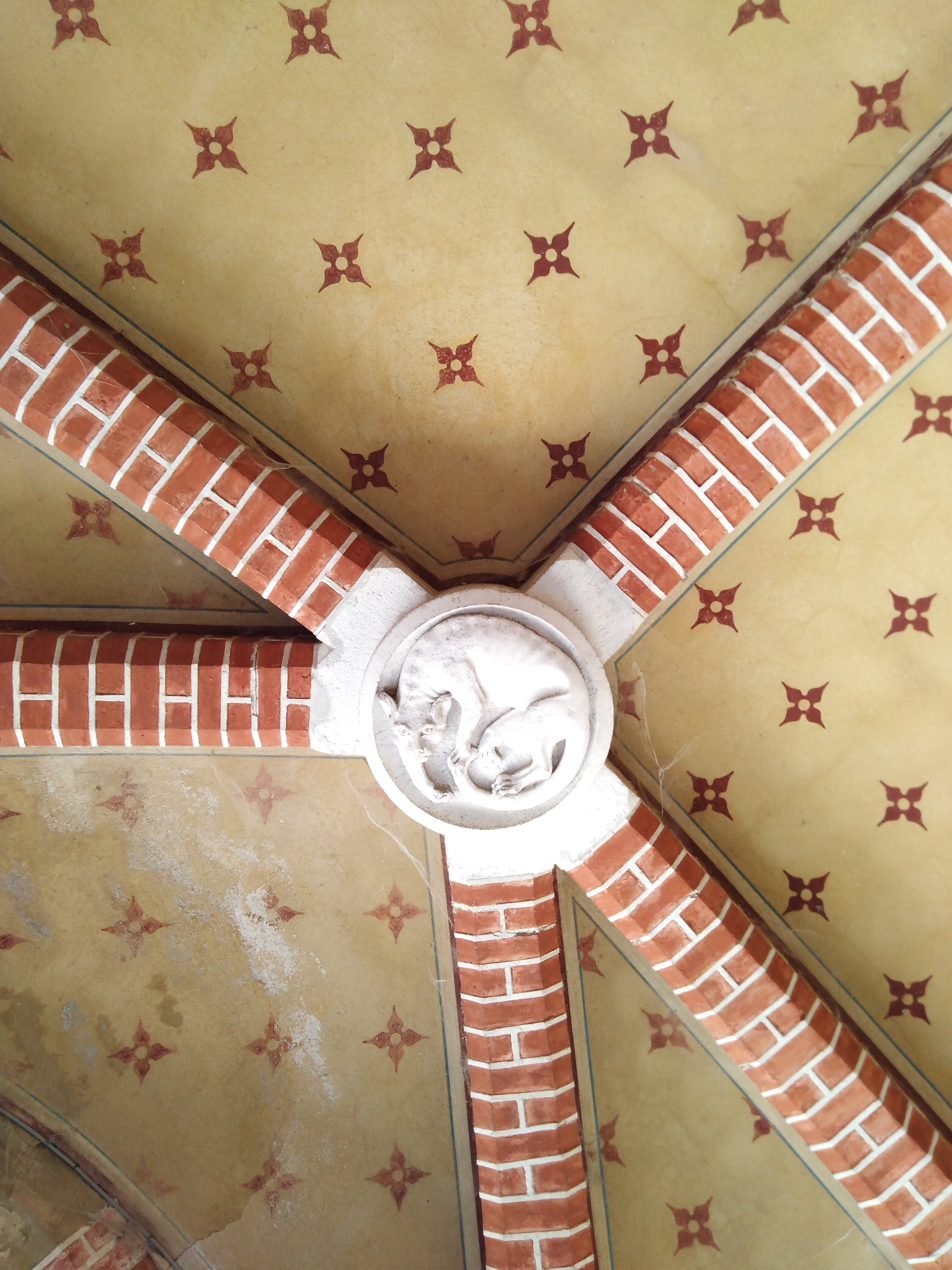
Castle porch vault

Inside the building, the decorations also mix different materials. The painted woods of the large living room, where a monumental fireplace is enthroned, whose mantle sculpture represents a scene recalling that the Virieu family offered land so that the Chartreux could build their abbey of the Sylve Bénite (Le Pin). This same room has several tapestries from the Beauvais Royal Manufactory. The library is also adorned with painted woods and houses many precious books and archives that the family had hidden before taking refuge in Switzerland. These writings could thus return to the bookcases on two floors of the property. Brick and marble are also very much present inside the castle, as are numerous draped forgeries characteristic of Viollet-le-Duc's restorations.

=== Gardens ===
The castle is surrounded by a soberly laid out landscaped estate with a waterfall, a large flowery landscaped park with its pond, situated to the south of the building. This sector of the property dominates the valley of the Bourbre (called the "Petit Grésivaudan" by the local historian Félix Crozet), in the distance the silhouette of the Notre Dame de l'Assomption de Châbons church standing out on the horizon during sunset.

== Events ==
=== Festival Berlioz ===
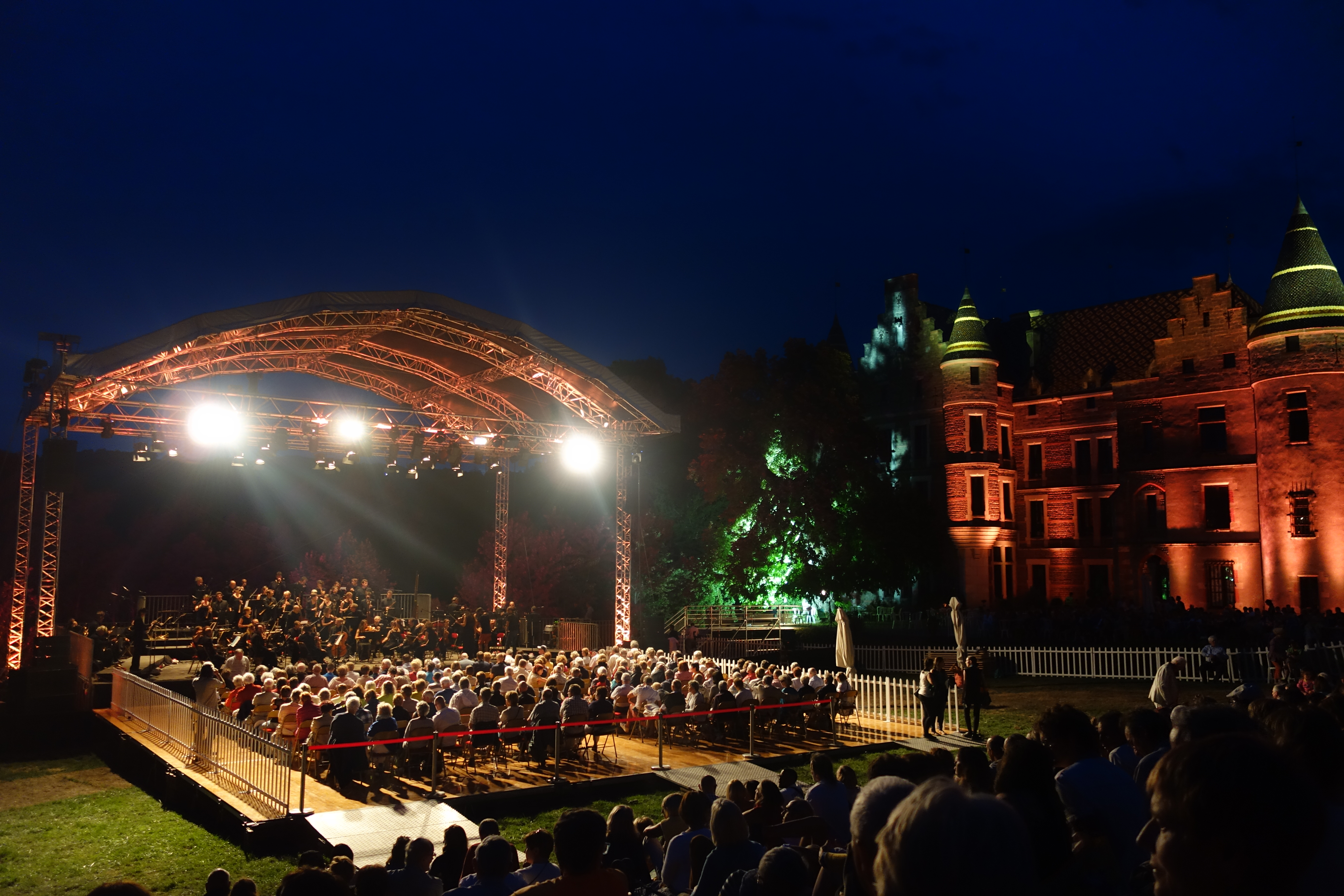
Concert à Pupetières, Août 2017

During the 2017 edition of the Festival Berlioz, organised in La Côte-Saint-André in honour of the French composer, "decentralised" concerts and readings in the salons and gardens were held on the estate and in the château. The programme (called "The spiritual concert" under the direction of Hervé Niquet) presented several musical works:

- Marc-Antoine Charpentier
  - Te Deum, Marches pour les trompettes » (extracts)
- Georg Frideric Handel
  - Water Music (Suites I et II)
  - Concerti grossi n°4 et n°5 op. 3 (extracts)
  - Water Music (Suite III)
  - Music for the Royal Fireworks (accompanied by fireworks).

=== Plant Day ===
Every year, the owners of the Château de Pupetières organise the "Plant Day", which welcomes a large public who come to discover a park with numerous exhibitors of various flowers and plants, as well as animations, conferences, workshops and exhibitions. Visits to the Château are also offered in conjunction with this event.

The 8th Plant Day took place during September 2019 with the presence of 70 exhibitors. During the 2017 event, two documentary films were screened on the occasion of the 6th anniversary.

== Gallery ==
Pictures of the Château de Pupetières and its estate in August 2019

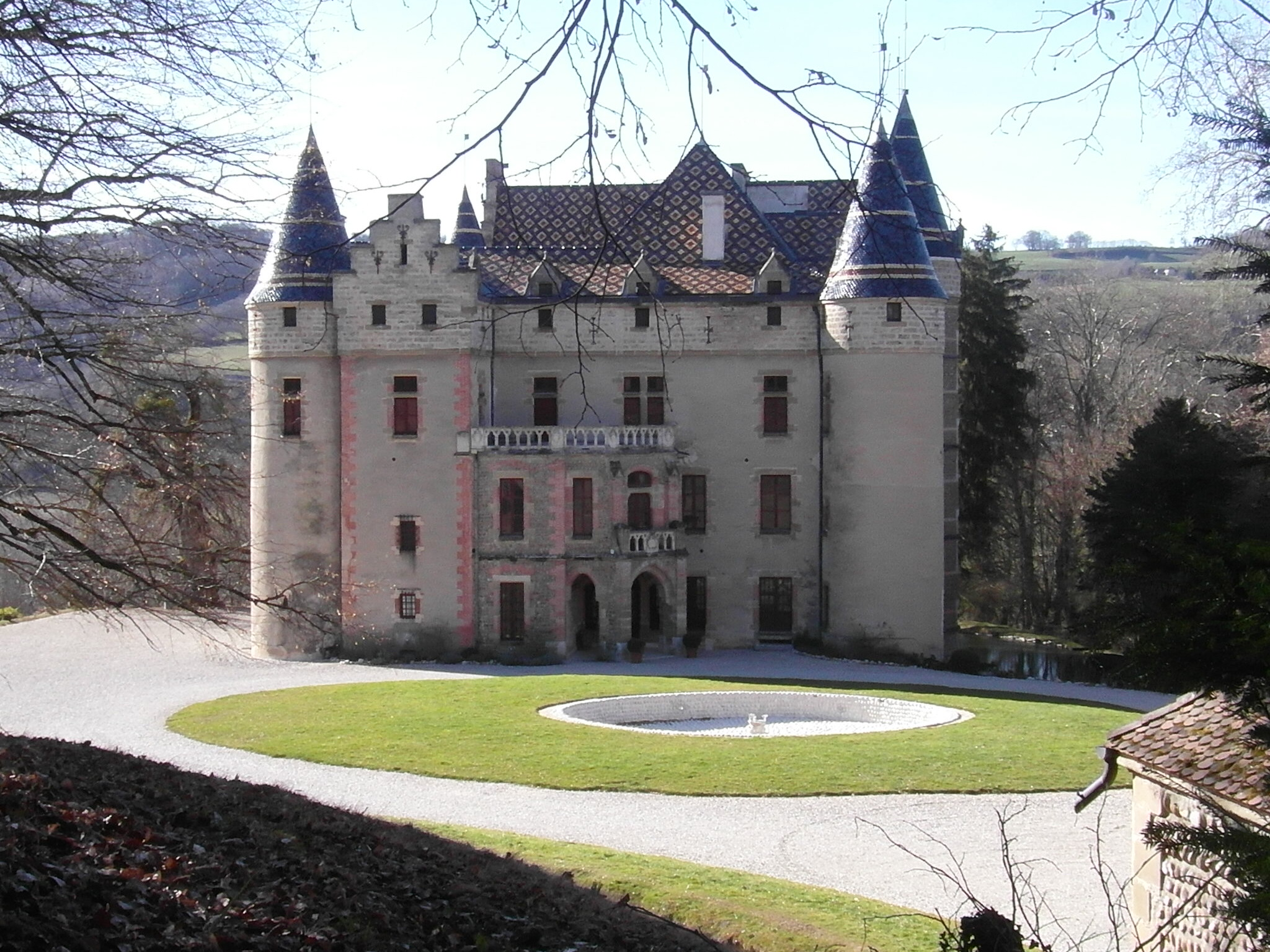
Castle

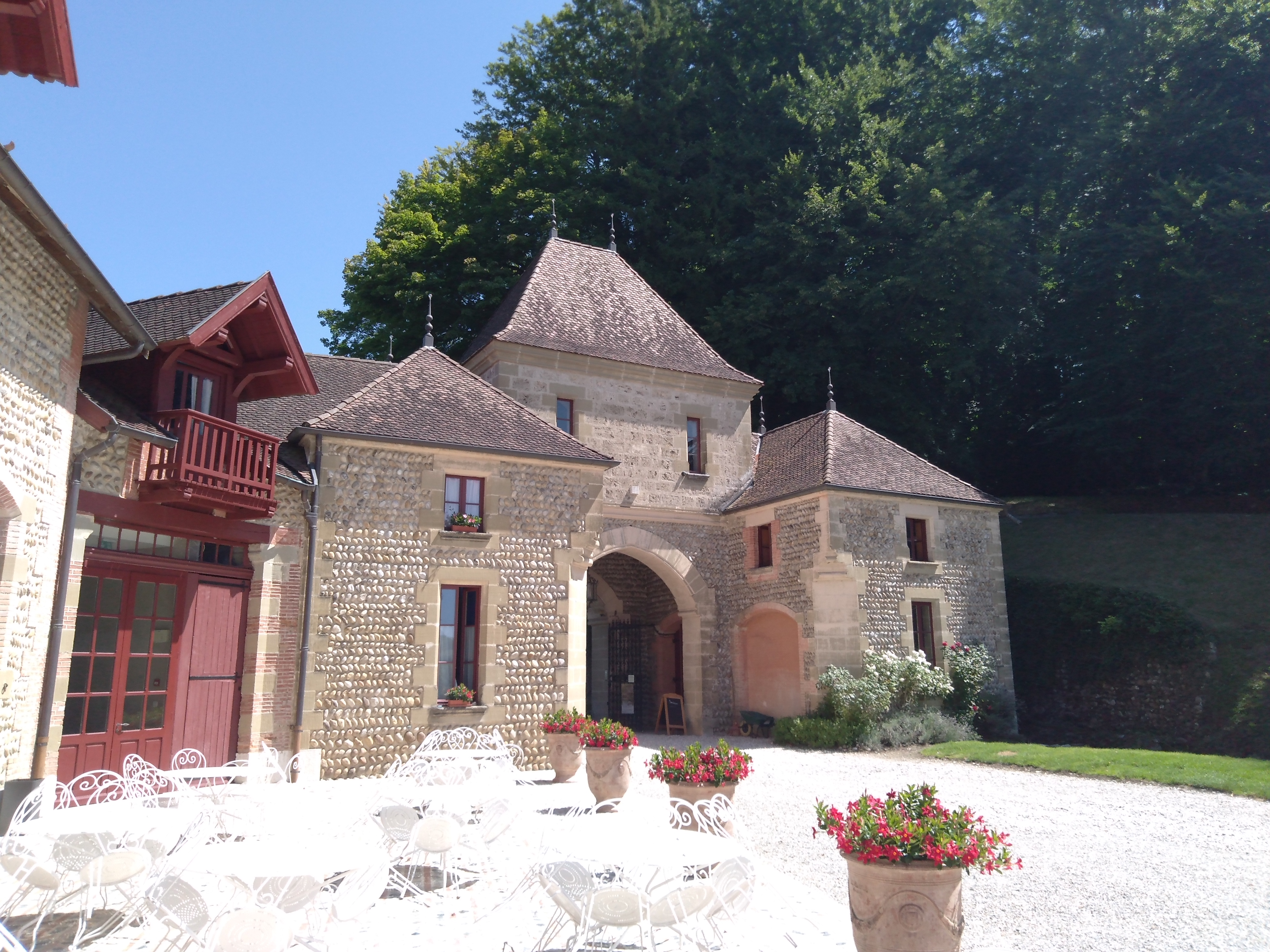
Entrance and common

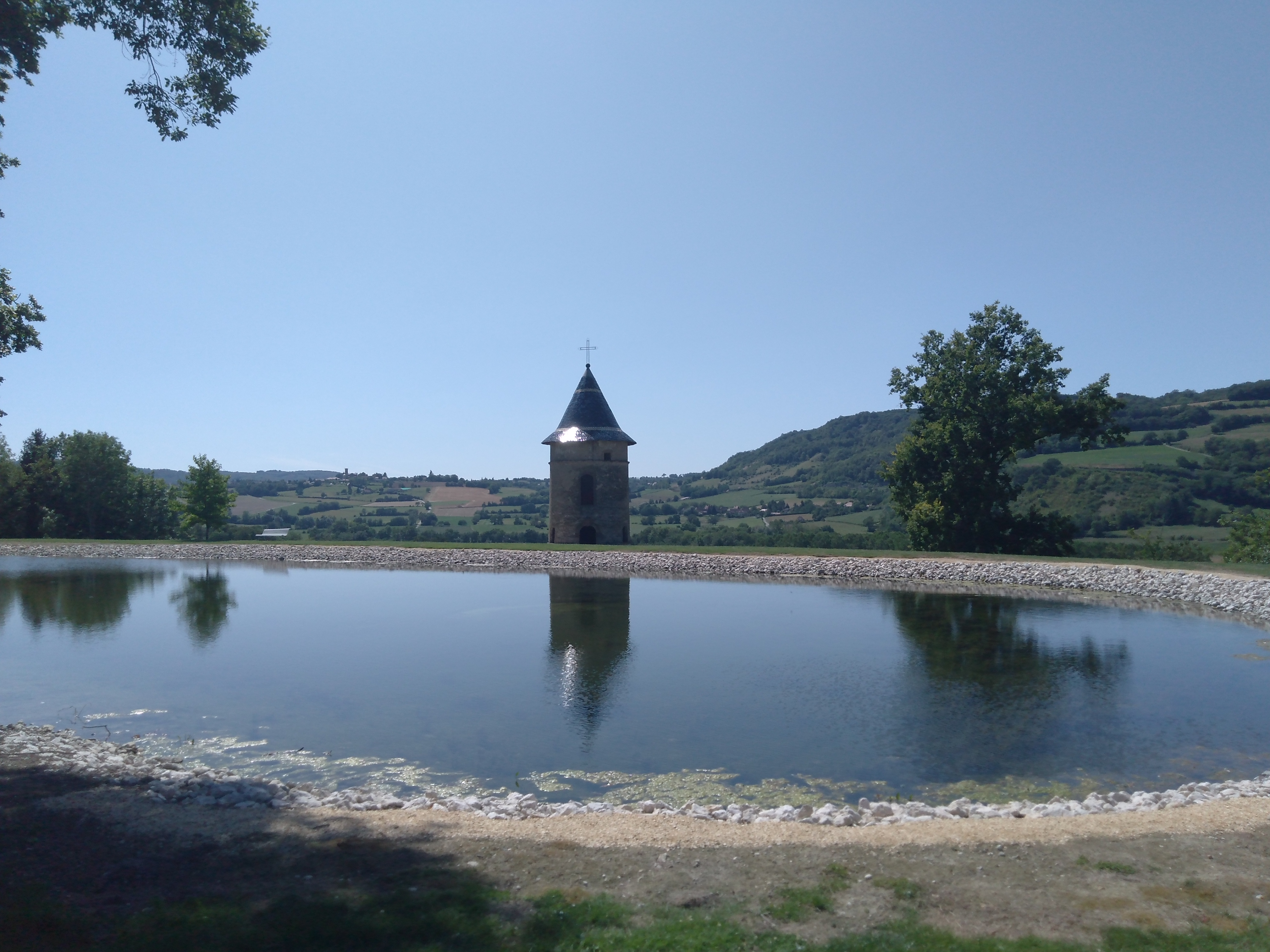
Pond of the estate

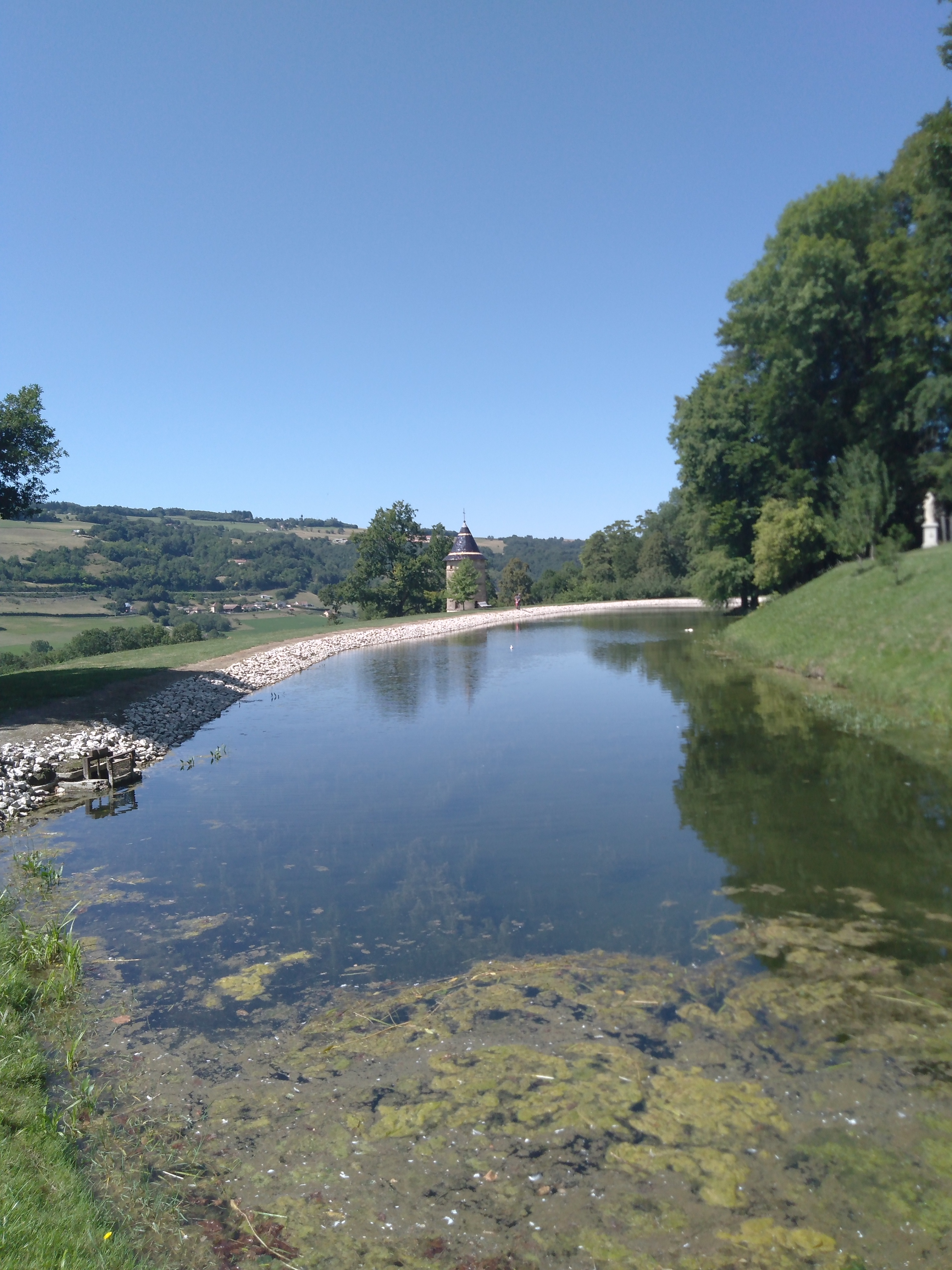
Pond

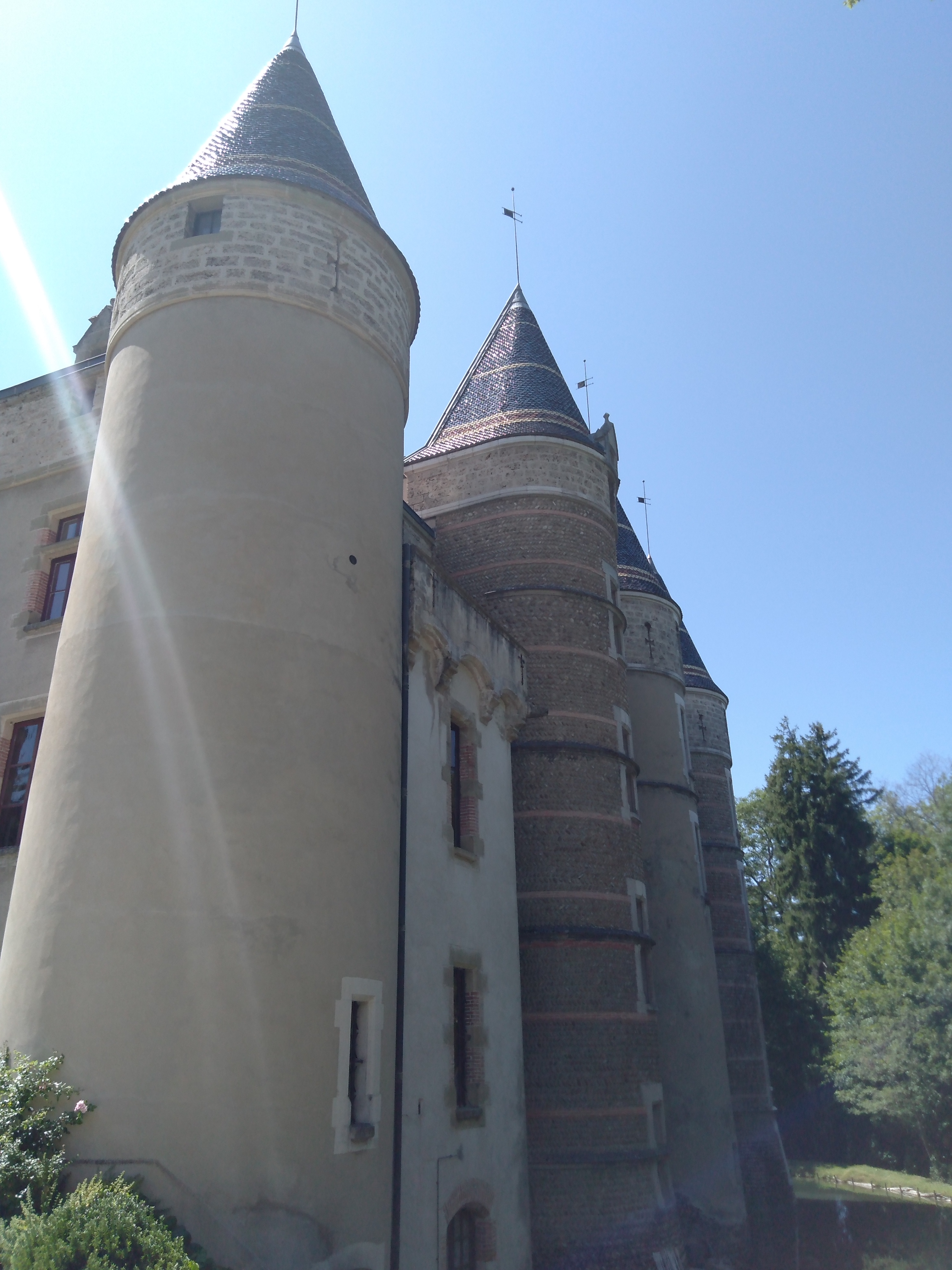
Outer tower

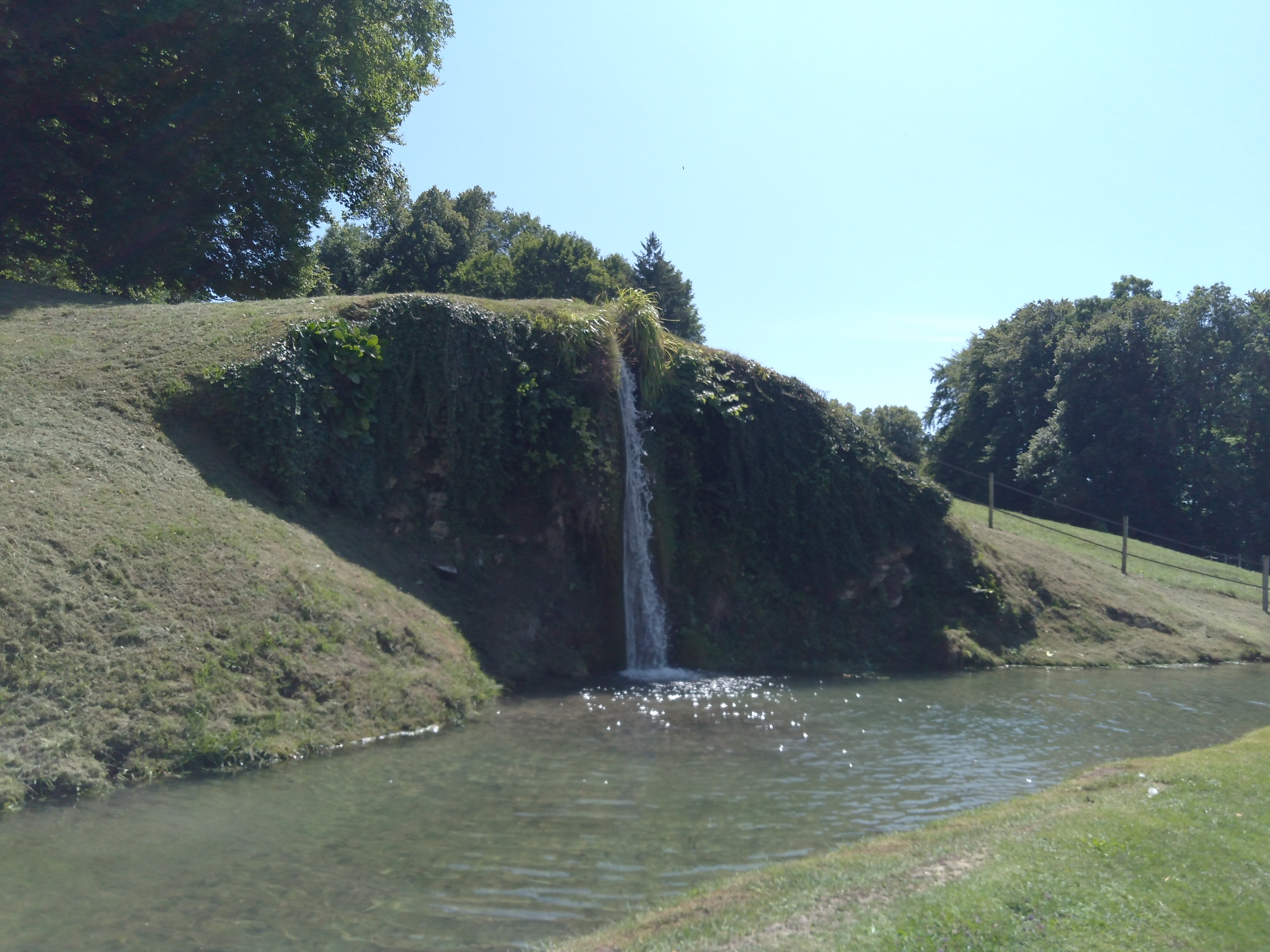
Waterfall

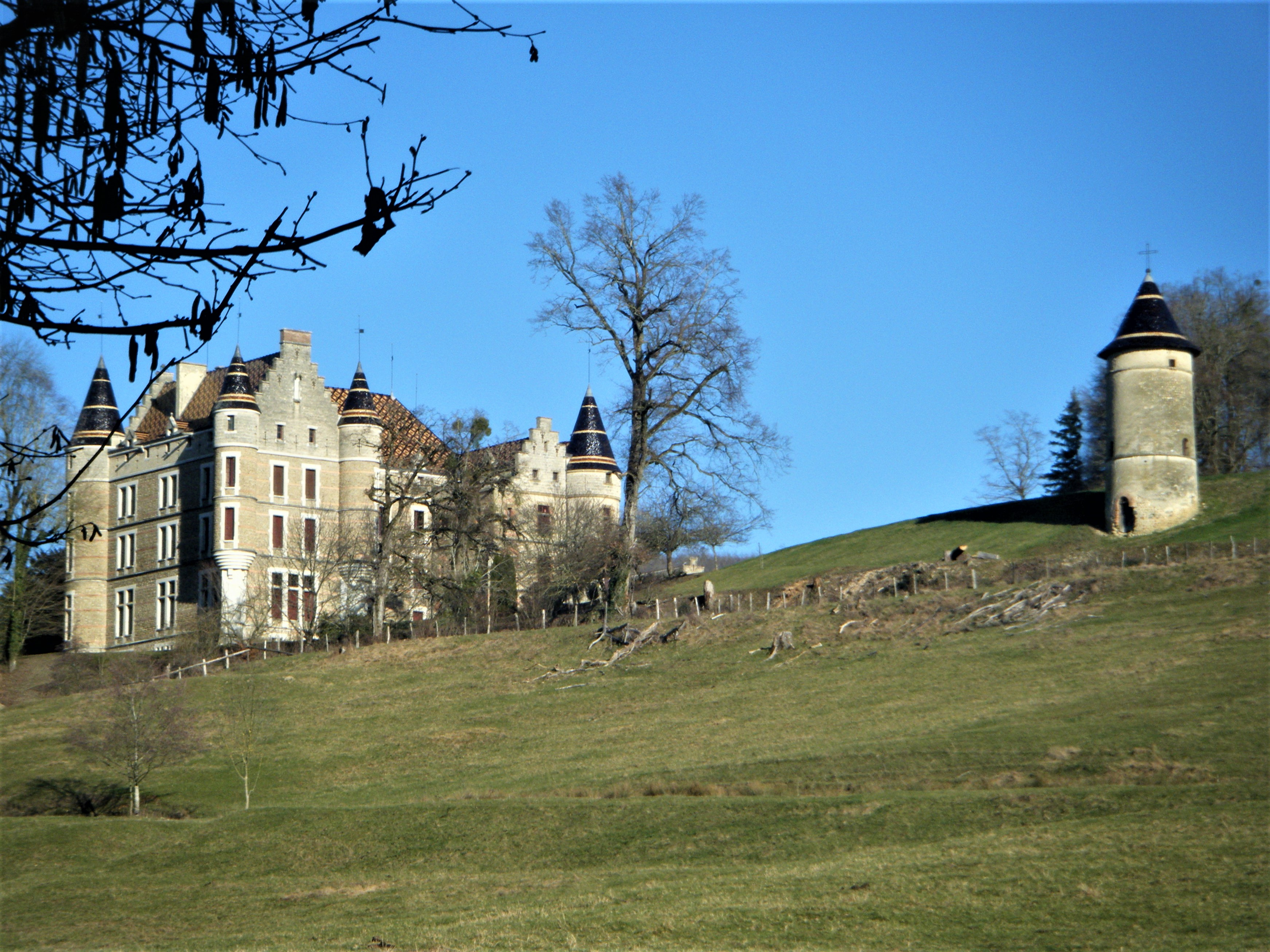
Estate viewed from RD73
