= Julien Belin =

Julien Belin was a French composer and lutenist active in the second half of the 16th century; he died after 1584.

== Biography ==
The only information about his life comes from the Bibliothèque de La Croix Du Maine, in which he is said to be a Manceau, therefore a native of Le Mans or surroundings in 1584 in the Maine.

His collection, published in 1556, gives René de Saint-François, archdeacon of Le Mans, as a probable protector, and shows him as a capable lutenist, developing his own style, notwithstanding the influence of lutenists Francesco Canova da Milano and Albert de Rippe.

== Works ==
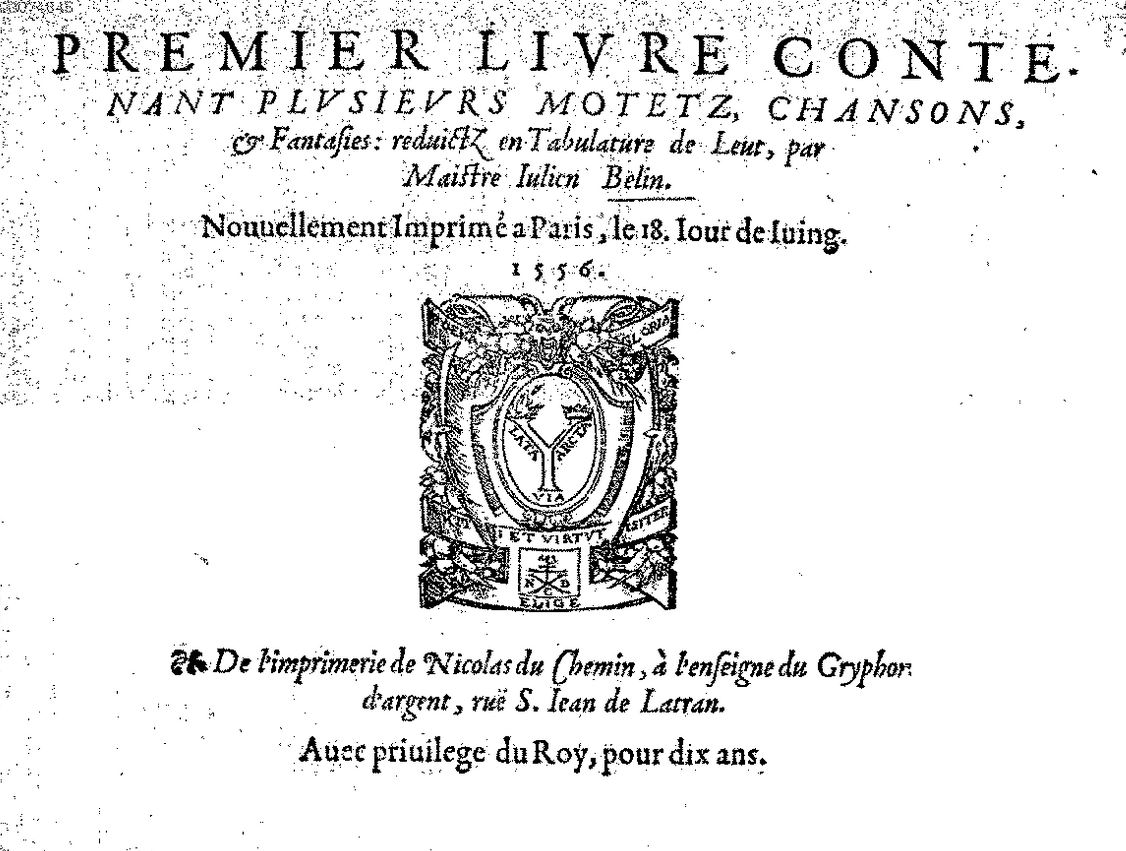
Title page of Julien Belin's collection (Paris: Nicolas Du Chemin, 1556).

In 1556, he published his Premier livre contenant plusieurs motetz, chansons & fantasies reduictz en tabulature de leut by Nicolas Du Chemin in Paris with a dedication to René de Saint-François. (read online here). Modern edition by Michel Renault: Éditions du CNRS, 1976 (series Le Chœur des Muses : Corpus des luthistes français).

The collection contains:

- Six very ornamented songs transcribed for the lute, by Jacques Arcadelt, Pierre Certon, Roger Pathie called Rogier (2) and Pierre Sandrin (2).
- A transcript of the motet Cantate Domino (Anonymous, not ornamented and probably attributable to Belin himself);
- A transcription of the song Les Bourguignons (same remarks);
- Seven fantasies, fairly short, two of which are described as "trio" and written in three parts. They are less ornamented than the transcriptions of the songs and written in a rigorous polyphony. Five of the fantasies have been taken up, grouped and in the same order, in the Thesaurus musicus continens selectissima Alberti Ripae, Valentini Bacfari et aliorum praestantissimorum carmina ad usum chelys... published in Louvain by Petrus Phalesius the Elder, publisher, in 1574.

The analysis of the pieces reveals that Belin was influenced by the style of Albert de Rippe (of whom he was perhaps a pupil).

== Discography ==
- Four pièces are recorded in Julien Belin & Robert Meigret : compositeurs du Maine au XVIe siècle, by the Ensemble vocal du Maine; Jean-Dominique Abrell, choir leader; Michel Amoric, lute. A CD in addition to the article Amoric 2002, quoted in reference.
- The Second trio is recorded in La Magdalena: lute music of Renaissance France, performed by Christopher Wilson. A CD Virgin Veritas, réf. B000005GGS, EAN 0724354514029 (2000).
- ’Mille ans de musique. Mastership of the Cathedral of Le Mans, dir. Philippe Lenoble. Pieces by Jehan Daniel, Jacques Peltier, Julien Belin, André Pechon, Innocent Boutry, Pierre Bouteiller and others. 1 CD Editions Art et Musique, 2006, réf. B00139P31G.

== Bibliography ==
- François Grudé de La Croix du Maine. La Bibliothèque... (1584). Reissue of Paris, 1772, ed. Rigoley de Juvigny.
- Michel Renault. "Julien Belin" in Grove Dictionary of Music, online edition.
- Michel Amoric, Robert Meigret, Julien Belin : deux compositeurs manceaux de musique profane de la Renaissance, Revue historique et archéologique du Maine, série 4, volume 2 (2002), (pp. 243–260).
- François Lesure and Geneviève Thibault de Chambure. Bibliographie des éditions musicales publiées par Nicolas Du Chemin (1549-1576), Annales musicologiques 1 (1953) (pp. 269–273) + suppl.
