= Requiem in C minor (Cherubini) =

Composition by Luigi Cherubini

The Requiem in C minor for mixed chorus was written by Luigi Cherubini in 1816 and premiered 21 January 1817 at a commemoration service for King Louis XVI of France on the twenty-fourth anniversary of his beheading during the French Revolution.

The requiem was greatly admired by Beethoven, Schumann, Berlioz and Brahms. It was performed at the funeral of Beethoven in 1827.

== Movements ==
This particular setting of the requiem Mass consists of seven movements:

1. Introitus et Kyrie
2. Graduale
3. Dies Irae
4. Offertorium
5. Sanctus
6. Pie Jesu
7. Agnus Dei

In 1820, a funeral march and a motet In Paradisum were added. In 1834, the work was prohibited by the archbishop of Paris because of its use of women's voices, and in 1836 Cherubini wrote a second Requiem in D minor for men's chorus to be performed at his own funeral.

The Requiem is orchestrated for SATB-choir, 2 oboes, 2 clarinets, 2 bassoons, 2 trumpets, 2 horns, 3 trombones, timpani, tam-tam, and strings. Note the absence of flutes and SATB-soloists, and the presence of a tam-tam, notably in the opening of the Dies Irae.

== Discography and references ==
A notable recording of this requiem was made under the baton of Arturo Toscanini, with the NBC Symphony Orchestra and Robert Shaw Chorale. Also included in the compilation is the Te Deum from Verdi's Quattro pezzi sacri. A recording of the Requiem in C Minor with the Ambrosian Singers and the Philharmonia Orchestra conducted by Riccardo Muti was made in 1982 and released by EMI. The later requiem in D minor was recorded by the same choir, orchestra and conductor, and released by EMI in 1987. Boston Baroque recorded the C-minor Requiem under Martin Pearlman in 2007 for Telarc.

The Requiem in C Minor was also recorded by Hervé Niquet and Le Concert Spirituel for the Alpa Classics Label in 2016.

The piece was also featured in the 1992 film Twin Peaks: Fire Walk With Me and in the 2007 film Rebellion: the Litvinenko Case.
