= Boutry =

Boutry is a French surname. Notable people with the surname include:

- Edgar-Henri Boutry (1857–1938), French sculptor
- Innocent Boutry, French chapel master
- Roger Boutry (1932–2019), French composer and conductor

== See also ==
- Boudry
