= Hervé Niquet =

French opera singer and conductor (born 1957)

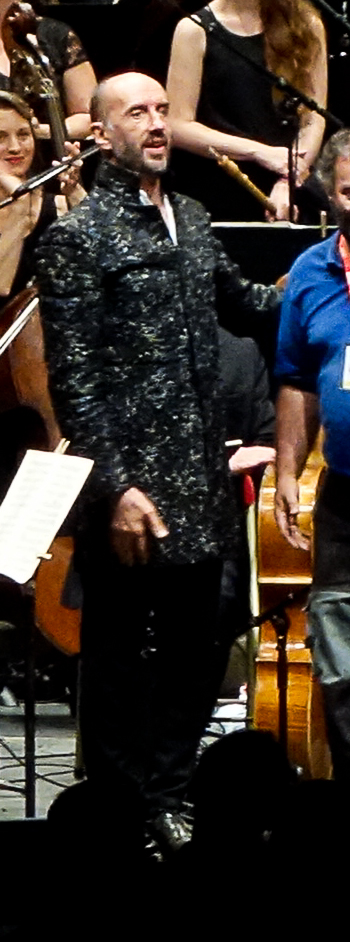
Hervé Niquet during the concert at Château de Pupetières (26 August 2017). Berlioz Festival 2017.

Hervé Niquet (born 28 October 1957) is a French conductor, harpsichordist, tenor, and the director of Le Concert Spirituel, specializing in French Baroque music.

== Biography ==
Born on 28 October 1957, Hervé Niquet was raised at Abbeville in the department of Somme. He studied harpsichord, composition, conducting, and opera singing. In 1980, he was appointed as the choir master of the Opéra National de Paris. Between 1985 and 1986, Niquet became a member of Les Arts florissants as a tenor, the ensemble that William Christie founded. In 1987, he established his own ensemble named "Le Concert Spirituel" which focuses on French grand motets of the 17th and 18th centuries.

== Recordings ==
Accord, Adda

- André Campra Vol.1 Te Deum. Motets Niquet (Adda 581250) no reissue
- André Campra Vol.II Requiem. Benedictus Dominus. Niquet (Accord)
- André Campra Vol.III Deus noster refugium. Cantate Domino. Messe ad majorem. De profundis. Niquet (Accord) 92
- Rossini: La cambiale di matrimonio
- Joseph Bodin de Boismortier. Grand Motet. 6 Motets a voix seul
- Jean Gilles (composer). Motet à St Jean-Baptiste. 'Cantate Jordanis Incolae'. Niquet 1989 (Accord)
- Jean Gilles. Te Deum. Diligam te Domine Niquet (Accord)

Naxos

- Paolo Lorenzani, Motet pour les confesseurs, Litanies à la Vierge, Antienne à la Vierge, Dialogue entre Jesus et l'âme, with Le Concert Spirituel (1997)
- Jean-Baptiste Lully, grands motets. 3 vols. (reissued Naxos)
- Joseph Michel 1688–1736 Lecons de Ténèbres Niquet 1997
- Joseph Bodin de Boismortier. Serenades francaises Niquet (Naxos)
- Joseph Bodin de Boismortier. Don Quichotte chez la Duchesse
- Joseph Bodin de Boismortier. Ballets de Village
- Marc-Antoine Charpentier (1643–1704):
  - 1994 : Messe des Morts à quatre voix H.7, Pie Jesu H.263, De profundis H.213, Litanies de la Vierge H.89, Transfige dulcissime Jesu H.251, Confitebor tibi H.220, Nisi Dominus H.160, H.160 a, Laudate pueri Dominum H.203, H.203 a, with Le Concert Spirituel, CD Naxos (Vol. 1) 10 de Répertoire.
  - 1995 : "Vespers of the Blessed Virgin", Beatus vir H.221, Laudate pueri H.149, Lauda Jerusalem H.210, Laetatus sum H.216, Nisi Dominus H.150, Ave Maris stella H.60, Magnificat H.72, Salve Regina à 3 choeurs H.24, with Le Concert Spirituel, CD Naxos (Vol. 2)
  - 1996 : Te deum H.147, Messe H.1, Precatio pro Regis H.166, Panis quem ego dabo H.275, Domine salvum fac regem H.281, Canticum Zachariae H.345, with Le Concert Spirituel, CD Naxos (Vol.3)
  - 1998 : Magnificat H.76, Litanies de la Vierge H.83, Quatre antiennes à la Vierge H.44-47, Prière à la Vierge H.367, Pro omnibus festis H.333, Petit motet pour la Vierge H.30, Chant joyeux du temps de Pâques H.339, with Le Concert Spirituel, CD Naxos (Vol. 4)
- Louis-Nicolas Clérambault :
  - Le Triomphe d'Iris (1706) (Naxos)
  - 2 Cantatas : Orphée, Léandre et Héro, + sonatas Piau/Niquet (Naxos)
  - 2 Cantatas : La Mort d'Hercule, Polipheme, + symphonias Coadou/Niquet 96 (Naxos)
- Orazio Benevoli. Missa Azzolina. Magnificat. Dixit Dominus. Laetatus sum
- Jean-Nicolas Geoffrey. Messe pour les fetes doubles. Memento Domine Davi. Regina coeli
- Emmanuel Chabrier. España, Suite pastorale, Habanera, Danse slave and Fête polonaise from Le roi malgré lui, Lamento, Prélude pastoral and Joyeuse marche.
- Paolo Lorenzani. Motet pour les confesseurs.

Glossa

- Joseph Bodin de Boismortier. Daphnis et Chloe (2CD) Niquet (Glossa Lorraine)
- Joseph Bodin de Boismortier. Sonates pour basses
- François d' Agincourt. Pièces D'Orgue
- François d’ Agincourt Pieces de Clavecin Dediees a la reine Niquet
- 2001: Henry Purcell's Dido and Æneas, with Le Concert Spirituel and Glossa.
- 2003: Georg Friedrich Haendel's Water Music & Fireworks with Le Concert Spirituel and Glossa.
- 2003: Henri Desmarets' Grands Motets, vol. 1, with Le Concert Spirituel and Glossa.
- 2004: Henry Purcell's King Arthur, with Véronique Gens, Hanna Bayodi, Béatrice Jarrige, Cyril Auvity, Joseph Cornwell, Peter Harvey, Le Concert Spirituel and Glossa.
- 2004: Joseph Bodin de Boismortier's Sonates pour basses, with Le Concert Spirituel and Glossa.
- 2005: Henri Desmarets' Grands Motets, vol. 2, with Le Concert Spirituel and Glossa.
- Marc-Antoine Charpentier :
  - 2002: 3 Leçons de ténèbres H.135, H.136, H.137, 5 Méditations pour le Carême H.380, H.381, H.386, H.387, H.388, with Le Concert Spirituel (Glossa)
  - 2002: Messe de Monsieur de Mauroy H.6, Domine Salvum Fac Regem H.299, with Le Concert Spirituel (Glossa)
  - 2006: Messe à huit voix H.2, Domine Salvum Fac Regem H.283 & Te Deum à huit voix H.145, with Le Concert Spirituel (Glossa)
  - 2009: Missa Assumpta est Maria H.11, Domine Salvum Fac Regem H.303 & H.291, with Le Concert Spirituel (Glossa)
- 2007: André-Cardinal Destouches's Callirhoé, with Cyril Auvity, Stéphanie d'Oustrac, João Fernandes, Le Concert Spirituel, and Glossa.
- 2007: Marin Marais's Sémélé, with Shannon Mercer, Jaël Azzaretti, Bénédicte Tauran, Hjördis Thébault, Anders J. Dahlin, Thomas Dolié, Marc Labonnette, Lisandro Abadie, Le Concert Spirituel and Glossa.
- André Campra. Le Carnaval de Venise Opéra-ballet. Paris, 1699
- André Grétry. Andromaque
- Jean-Baptiste Lully. Proserpine. Quinault 1680
- Pierre Bouteiller. Missa pro defunctis, Sébastien de Brossard Stabat Mater Le Concert Spirituel, Hervé Niquet
- Alessandro Striggio. Missa "Ecco si Beato Giorno"
- Louis Le Prince. Missa Macula non est in te, Marc-Antoine Charpentier, Motets H.306, H.341, H.245, H.299, (Ouverture H.536), Lully, O dulcissime Domine (2013)

Prix de Rome, Ediciones singulares

- Camille Saint-Saëns. Music for the Prix de Rome
- Claude Debussy. Music For The Prix de Rome. Le Gladiateur; Invocation; La Damoiselle élue; Printemps;
- Gustave Charpentier. Music for the Prix de Rome
- Max d'Ollone. Music for the Prix de Rome

Other

- Ferdinand Hérold. Piano concertos 2-4. Jean-Frederic Neuburger, Sinfonia Varsovia, Hervé Niquet. Mirare
- François Cosset. Missa Super Flumina Babylonis. Atma
- Jean Philippe Rameau. Pygmalion (Acte de Ballet) Le Temple de la Gloire. Virgin
- Jean Philippe Rameau. In convertendo, Virgin
- Orazio Benevoli. Missa Si Deus Pro Nobis, Magnificat, Alpha
- Marc-Antoine Charpentier. Médée, Alpha 2023
