= Stéphanie d'Oustrac =

French mezzo-soprano (born 1974)

Stéphanie d'Oustrac (born 1974, in Rennes) is a French mezzo-soprano.

== Biography ==
Stéphanie d'Oustrac was born in Rennes in 1974. She is the great grand niece of Francis Poulenc and Jacques La Presle.

Her family background was neither musical nor cultured, but around 11 she joined a local choir because she was asthmatic and shy; she began to get solos in the choir and developed ambitions to be an actress. She was part of the Maîtrise de Bretagne children's choir. She was a student of Oleg Afonine for nearly a year.

Her teachers included Margreet Honig and Bernard Roubeau, a vocal therapist with whom she continued to works mainly on the physiology behind singing. She undertook formal studies at the conservatoires in Rennes and Lyon. At the Conservatoire national supérieur de musique et de danse de Lyon she received the First Prize for Song in 1998 and was spotted by William Christie who worked with Les Arts Florissants. In 1998 she began to sing in Christie's Academy for young singers, leading to years of association with Les Arts Florissants. Her first role was Médée in Lully’s Thésée followed by the title role in his Les Métamorphoses de Psyché. After taking some time off and giving birth to her daughter, she met Christie at a concert and Christie asked to come back and sing Purcell's Dido. Under Christie and Marc Minkowski she expanded her repertoire to include Berlioz, Fauré and Britten.

In the years following this she sang Mozart's Sesto, Dorabella and Idamante. Her first Carmen was in Lille in 2010, after which undertook the role in Glyndebourne, Aix-en-Provence, Madrid, Dallas, Tokyo and Cologne. From 1998 to 2012 she appeared in Armide, Atys (Jean-Baptiste Lully); Médée (Marc-Antoine Charpentier); La Périchole, La belle Hélène (Jacques Offenbach); L'Heure espagnole (Maurice Ravel); and Pelléas et Mélisande (Claude Debussy).

She appeared at the Glyndebourne Festival Opera. She also regularly gives chamber music concerts with various ensembles (The Paladins, The Arpeggiata, The Bergamasco, Il Seminario Musicale, Amaryllis). She is also a soloist in recital.

== Selected recordings ==
- Marc-Antoine Charpentier : Médée H.491, Stéphanie d'Oustrac (Médée), François-Nicolas Geslot (Jason), Gaëlle Méchaly (Créuse), Bertrand Chuberre (Oronte), Le Concert Spirituel, conducted by Hervé Niquet, stage Director, Olivier Simonnet, directed by Olivier Simonnet. DVD, Armide Classics / Vox Lucida ARM 002, 2004.
- André Cardinal Destouches : Callirhoé, Stéphanie d'Oustrac (Callirhoé), Cyril Auvity (Agénor), João Fernandes(Corésus), Ingrid Perruche (La Reine), Renaud Delaigue, Le Ministre, Le Concert Spirituel, conducted by Hervé Niquet. Glossa, 2007.
- Maurice Ravel : L'Heure espagnole and L'Enfant et les Sortilèges, Stéphanie d'Oustrac, Concepcion, The Glyndebourne Chorus, London Philharmonic Orchestra, conducted by Kazushi Ono, Stage Director, Laurent Pelly. DVD, Glyndebourne Fra Musica, 2012.
- Berlioz's Béatrice et Bénédict : Stéphanie d'Oustrac (Béatrice), Paul Appleby (Bénédict), Sophie Karthäuser (Héro), Lionel Lothe (Somarone), Philippe Sly (Claudio), Frédéric Caton (Don Pedro), Katarina Bradìc (Ursule), London Philharmonic Orchestra, The Glyndebourne Chorus, staged by Laurent Pelly, conducted by Antonello Manacorda. DVD, Opus Arte, 2017
- Emmanuel Chabrier : L'étoile, Stéphanie d'Oustrac, Lazuli, Hélène Guilmette, La princesse Laoula, Christophe Mortagne, Le Roi Ouf, Jérome Varnier, Siroco, Choeur de l'Opéra national des Pays-Bas, Orchestre de la Résidence de La Haye, conducted by Patrick Fournillier, Stage Director, Laurent Pelly. DVD/Blu-ray, Naxos, 2019 (Diapason d'or of the year, 2019)
- Recital of French songs - Invitation Au Voyage (Mélodies Françaises), with Pascal Jourdan (piano). Ambronay Éditions (CD), 2014
