= Callirhoé =

Opera by André Cardinal Destouches

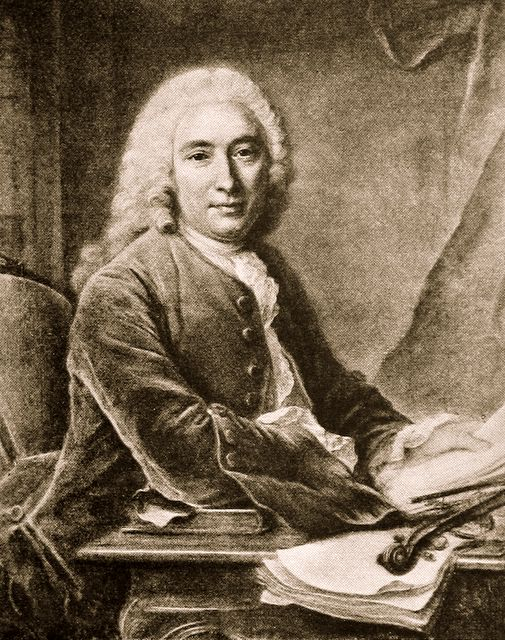
Composer André Cardinal Destouches

Callirhoé is an opera by the French composer André Cardinal Destouches. It takes the form of a tragédie en musique in a prologue and five acts. The libretto, by Pierre-Charles Roy, is based on a story from Description of Greece by Pausanias (see Coresus). The opera was first performed on 27 December 1712, by the Académie royale de musique at the Théâtre du Palais-Royal in Paris. Destouches reworked the score for a revival on 22 October 1743. This version ends abruptly with the death of Corésus.

== Roles ==
Role	Voice type	Premiere Cast
Victoire (Victory)	soprano	Mlle Poussin
Astrée (Astraea)	soprano	Mlle Heusé
A follower of Astrée	soprano	Mlle Limbourg
Callirhoé, hereditary Princess of Calydon	soprano	Françoise Journet
The Queen of Calydon	soprano	Mme Pestel
Corésus, high priest of Bacchus	bass-baritone	Gabriel-Vincent Thévenard
Agénor, a Prince of Calydon, in love with Callirhoé	haute-contre	Jacques Cochereau
A woman from Calydon	soprano	Mlle Mignier
The priest of Pan	bass-baritone	Charles Hardouin
A dryad	soprano	Marie Antier
The oracle	taille (baritenor)	Louis Mantienne
A shepherdess	soprano	Mlle Heuzé
Another shepherdess	soprano	Mlle Poussin
Bacchus	bass-baritone	M. de la Rosière

== Synopsis ==
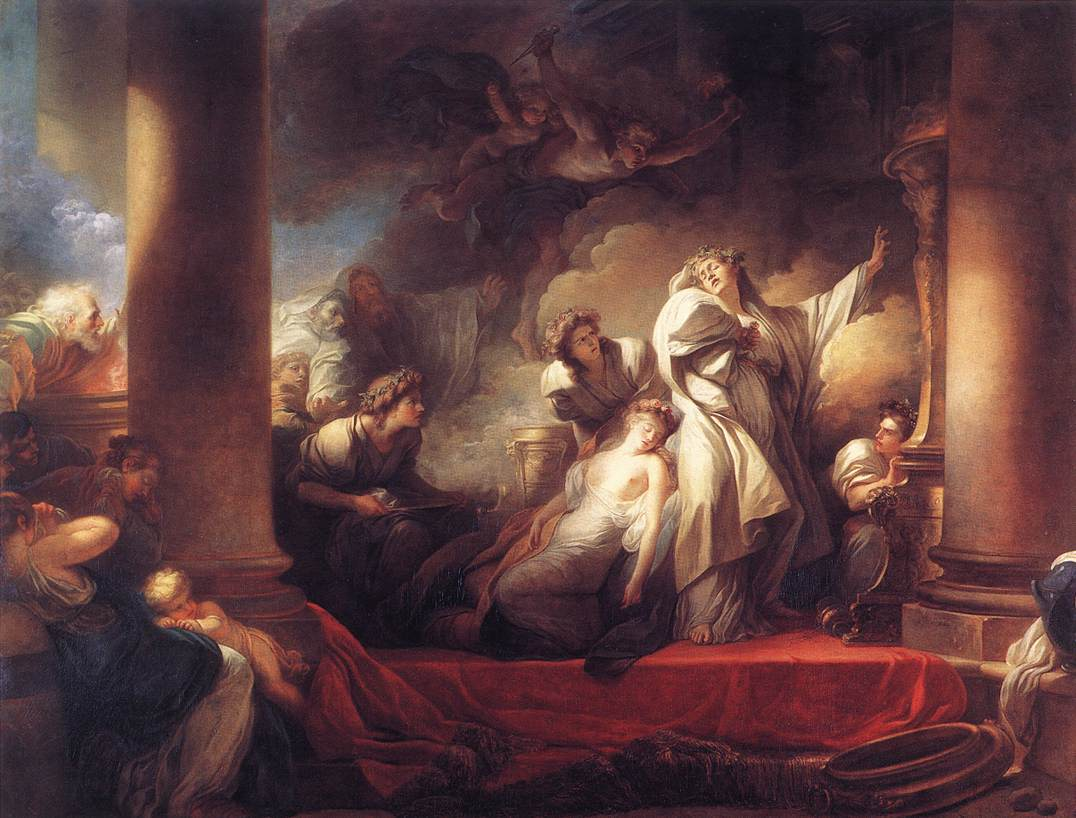
The High Priest Coresus Sacrificing Himself to Save Callirhoe (1765) by Jean-Honoré Fragonard (1732–1806)

Following the revised version of 1743.

=== Act One ===
Princess Callirhoé, heiress to the kingdom of Calydon, laments her fate. Her parents are forcing her to marry a man she loathes, Corésus, the high priest of Bacchus, when she is really in love with Agénor. The wedding ceremony of Corésus and Callirhoé is interrupted when the latter faints at the altar.

=== Act Two ===
Agénor declares his love for Callirhoé but the couple are surprised by the furious Corésus. Corésus calls on the priests of Bacchus and the people of Calydon to kill Agénor.

=== Act Three ===
Eager to put an end to the disturbances, Callirhoé's mother takes her daughter to consult the oracle of Pan. The god delivers his sentence: the blood of Callirhoé must be spilt or that of someone in love with her.

=== Act Four ===
Callirhoé is resigned to sacrifice herself for the good of the kingdom. But the people protest against the oracle and Agénor declares he is ready to die himself to save his beloved.

=== Act Five ===
Alone in the temple, Corésus ponders what action to take. If Agénor is sacrificed, then he will win Callirhoé but she will hate him for evermore. As Agénor and Callirhoé enter the temple, both eager to sacrifice themselves to save the other, Corésus stabs himself to death. The oracle is fulfilled: the blood of a man in love with Callirhoé has been spilt.

== Recordings ==
- Callirhoé, (1743 version, without prologue), Stéphanie d'Oustrac, Callirhoé, Cyril Auvity, Agénor, João Fernandes, Corésus, Ingrid Perruche, La Reine, Renaud Delaigue, Le Ministre, Stéphanie Révidat, Une Princesse de Calypso, Une Bergère, Le Concert Spirituel, conducted by Hervé Niquet. 2 CD Glossa 2007.

== See also ==
- Cécile Chaminade, who composed a ballet Callirhoé
