= Pierre-Charles Roy =

French poet and man of letters

Pierre-Charles Roy (1683 — 23 October 1764) was a French poet and man of letters, noted for his collaborations with the composers François Francoeur and André Cardinal Destouches, to produce librettos for several opera-ballets, on classical subjects or pseudo-classical pastiches, for seven tragedies, and for his rivalry with the young Voltaire, who immortalised Roy with some disdainful public words.

In an early letter of 1719 to Jean-Baptiste Rousseau, Voltaire says, "I have been so unfortunate under the name of Arouet that I have taken another one especially to be confused no more with the poet Roy."

Roy was born and died in Paris. His first opera libretto, Philomèle, was performed at the Paris Opéra on 20 October 1705. By 1718 he had provided texts for seven tragédies en musique and was being hailed as a successor to Quinault. His involvement with musicians was not always positive: He was involved in a public brawl with composer Rameau after penning a derogatory poem about the latter.

Roy won prizes from the Académie Française and was elected to the Académie des Inscriptions et Belles Lettres, but his attempts to become an immortelle of the Académie Française were repeatedly rejected, occasioning some clandestine satires and epigrams on his part; however, the Duchess of Maine invited him to write for the Grandes Nuits de Sceaux in 1714 and 1715. He was appointed a Chevalier of the Order of St-Michel (1742), the first man of letters to be so honoured; and Mme de Pompadour had his works performed at her Théâtre des Petits Cabinets in the Petite Galerie at Versailles, 1747-51.

== Selected works ==
- Philomèle (1705), his first mounted success
- Bradamante (1707)
- Callirhoé (tragédie en musique, 1712), music by Destouches
- Ariane (1717)
- Sémiramis (tragédie lyrique, 1718), music by Destouches
- Les élémens (opéra-ballet, 1721), music by Destouches and Michel Richard Delalande
- Les stratagèmes de l'amour (ballet, 1726), music by Destouches
- Les Augustales (1744)
- La félicité (1745)
- Hippodamie
- Creüse
