= Marthésie =

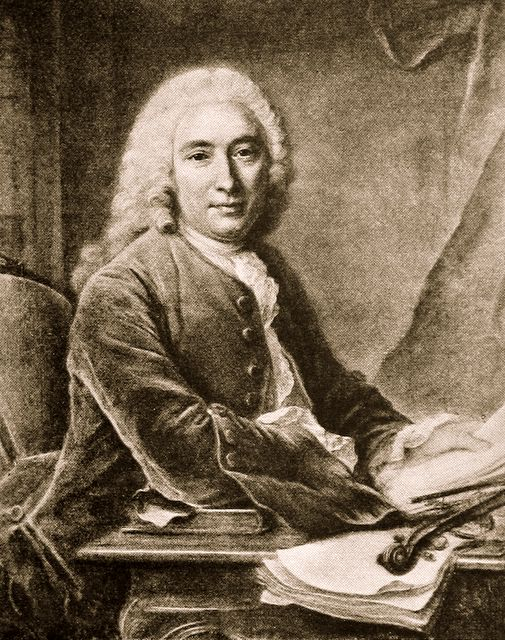
Composer André Cardinal Destouches

Marthésie, première reine des Amazones (Marthesia, First Queen of the Amazons) is an opera by the French composer André Cardinal Destouches, first performed at Fontainebleau on 11 October 1699. It takes the form of a tragédie en musique in a prologue and five acts. The libretto is by Antoine Houdar de La Motte.

== Sources ==
- (in French) Libretto at "Livres baroques"
