= François-Henri de Virieu =

French journalist and television presenter

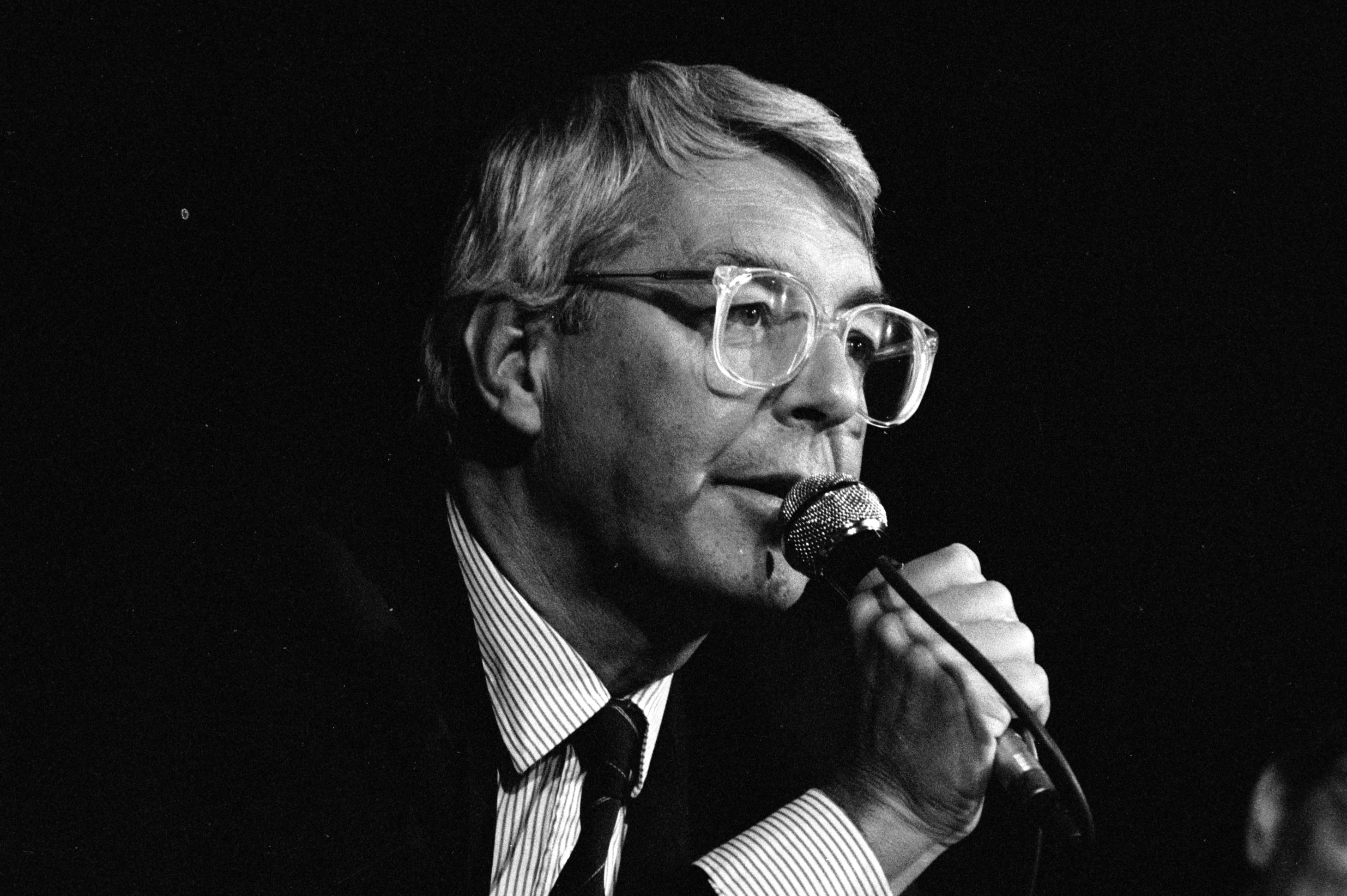
- François-Henri de Virieu in Deauville, 1989
- Born: 18 December 1931; Paris, France
- Died: 27 October 1997 (aged 65); Marly-le-Roi, Yvelines, France
- Occupations: Journalist, editor-in-chief, television presenter
- Years active: 1956–1997
- Notable credit: L'Heure de vérité
- Television: Antenne 2
- Relatives: François Henri, comte de Virieu (ancestor)

François-Henri de Virieu, marquis de Virieu (18 December 1931 – 27 October 1997) was a French journalist and television presenter.

== Biography ==
François-Henri de Virieu was born in Paris, son of the marquis Xavier de Virieu (1898–1953), colonel who was known for his acts of resistance during the Maquis du Vercors, and of Marie-Françoise de Brugière de Barante (1906–2004). He graduated with a degree of agricultural engineering at the École supérieure d'agricultures d'Angers. Five centuries before, Jean de Fay, seigneur de Virieu, one of his ancestors, was already interested in agriculture and accepted to convert to Roman Catholicism to protect the Italian immigrant Pierre Benay who imported from Bologne silk mills for the weavers of Lyon. François-Henri de Virieu comes from a very ancient family of the French nobility. His is also the direct descendant of François Henri, comte de Virieu (1754–1793).

== Journalism career ==
=== Economic journalist at Le Monde ===
François-Henri de Virieu began as an advisor for agricultural cooperatives. He became in 1956 an editor-in-chief for publications of the Centre d'Études des Techniques Agricoles. He was attached at the Institut d'Organisation Scientifique du Travail Agricole as an agricultural advisor. As a great-grandson of one of the founders Le Pèlerin, he presents himself at La Croix, but despite the great welcome of Jean Gélamur, he prefers to attempt his chance at Le Monde where the contact with Hubert Beuve-Méry is promoted due to the same belonging of this one at the same resistance field of the one that belonged his father.

François-Henri de Virieu did not wait less than six months to publish his first article. He officially joined the newspaper in July 1958 with an internship in agricultural affairs, during a productive period of agricultural manifestations, with negotiations of the Single market and reforms from the ministry of Edgard Pisani. He later published his first book La Fin d'une agriculture (1967) and also collaborates at the same time at different regional publications. In 1968, he was named chief of the department for social affairs in the economic service.

=== Chief editor of the daily news ===
In November 1969, becoming the same time a member of the French Democratic Confederation of Labour, he joined the OFRT as the chief of the political, economic and social service of Information Première. Assisted by young collaborators like Guy Claisse, Hervé Chabalier and Bernard Langlois, he became the editor-in-chief of the daily news in 1970. But the acknowledgement of Pierre Desgraupes in July 1972 forces him to leave the television field and become the director of the news service at Informations, the weekly news program in which he became one of the columnists since 1969. He then became unemployed in 1973 after its failure and published the same year Lip : 100 000 montres sans patron.

=== Chief editor of Le Matin de Paris (1977–81) ===
In 1973, he joined the Socialist Party before joining the next year the political service of Le Nouvel Observateur. After the refuse of Pierre Viansson-Ponté for becoming the editor-in-chief in October 1976, he became the editor-in-chief of the daily newspaper Le Matin de Paris. He then left the Socialist Party the same year to engage his support for the Union of the Left, and after its failure in September 1977, for the Socialist Party. In the meantime, he was in charge of the economic supplement and editor-in-chief of the weekly economic newspaper La Presse économique (1979–80). But in September 1980, he was in conflict with Claude Perdriel, whom the authoritarianism, omnipotence and interventionism in his redactional activity considerably reduced his authority. He then became editor-in-chief of the economic supplement, where he collaborates with journalist Pierre Largue, who served as a shifter between François-Henri de Virieu and the typographic workers.

=== Presenter of L'Heure de vérité ===
Since August 1981, he decided to join Antenne 2 where the new project proposed him the direction of the news. He published the same year a book about this subject titled Le Nouveau Pouvoir. His functions ended in September 1982 in the demand of the redaction, and he became director of the international relations of the channel before starting to present in May 1982 the political television program L'Heure de vérité until 1995.

== Personal life and death ==
François-Henri de Virieu married Marie-Claude Emy and had five children, Isabelle de Virieu (born in 1960), Stéphanie de Virieu (born in 1962), Guillaume de Virieu, marquis de Virieu (1964), Étienne de Virieu, comte de Virieu (1969–2011) and Nicolas de Virieu, comte de Virieu (born in 1975).

François-Henri de Virieu died on 27 October 1997 of pancreatic cancer in Marly-le-Roi, town where he was also the Mayor in 1995.

== Bibliography ==
- La Fin d’une agriculture, Calmann-Lévy, 1967
- Lip : 100 000 montres sans patron, Calmann-Lévy, 1973
- Le Nouveau Pouvoir : les 1 100 qui conduisent la France, co-written with Bernard Villeneuve, Jean-Claude Lattès, 1982
- La Médiacratie, Flammarion, 1984

== See also ==
- François Henri, comte de Virieu
