= Sémiramis (Destouches) =

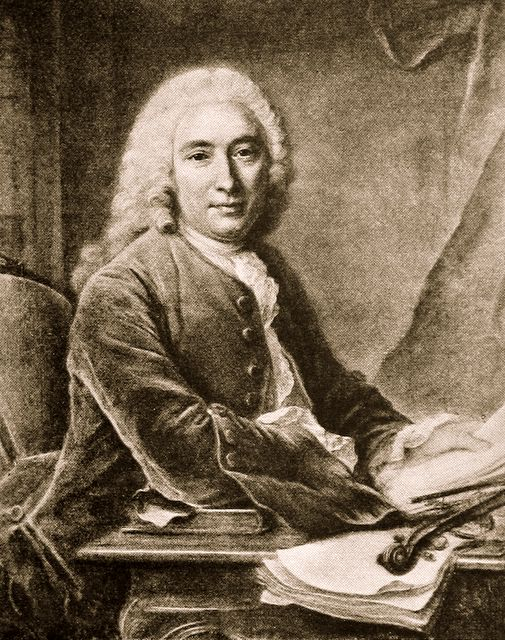
Composer André Cardinal Destouches

Sémiramis is an opera by the French composer André Cardinal Destouches, first performed at the Académie Royale de Musique (the Paris Opera) on 4 December 1718. It takes the form of a tragédie en musique in a prologue and five acts. The libretto is by Pierre-Charles Roy.

The opera was very successful : the Regent's eldest daughter, the Duchesse de Berry, came to see Sémiramis on December 7 : as if she were a queen, the haughty princess sat on an armchair which was set on a platform in the amphitheater. A barrier placed in the middle of the amphitheater, separated her and the thirty ladies of her court from the rest of the audience. On March 20, 1719, Mme de Berry, soon to give birth, saw Sémiramis again, sitting in the amphitheater on an armchair with the Regent and one of her sisters, both next to her on chairs.

== Recording ==
- Semiramis - Eleonore Pancrazi, Emmanuelle de Negri, Mathias Vidal, Thibault de Damas, Choeur du Concert Spirituel, Les Ombres, Margaux Blanchard 2CD 2021

== Sources ==
- (in French) Libretto at "Livres baroques"
- (in French) Félix Clément and Pierre Larousse Dictionnaire des Opéras, Paris, 1881
