= Omphale (Destouches) =

Opera by André Cardinal Destouches

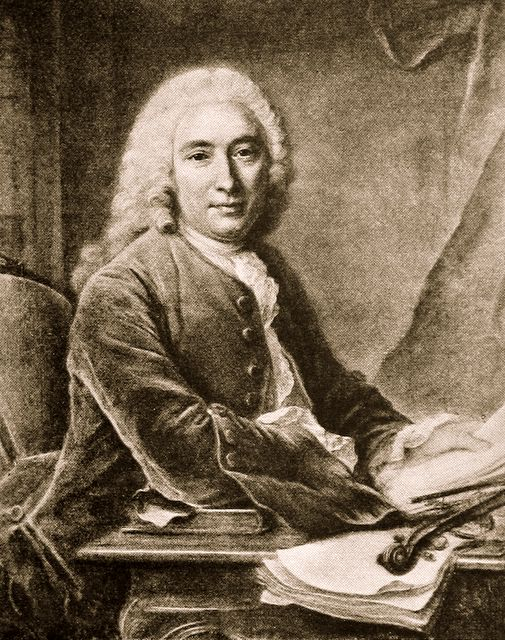
Composer André Cardinal Destouches

Omphale is an opera by the French composer André Cardinal Destouches, first performed at the Académie Royale de Musique (the Paris Opera) on 10 November 1701. It takes the form of a tragédie en musique in a prologue and five acts. The libretto is by Antoine Houdar de La Motte.

== Sources ==
- (in French) Libretto at "Livres baroques"
- (in French) Félix Clément and Pierre Larousse Dictionnaire des Opéras, Paris, 1881
- Viking Opera Guide, ed. Amanda Holden (Viking, 1993): article on Omphale, p.262
