= Innocent Boutry =

French chapel master

Innocent Boutry was a French chapel master, active in several towns between 1657 and 1680 and notably in Le Mans.

== Biography ==
He was born around 1634, in the diocese of Chartres. He acceded to priesthood around 1663-1664.

He was received at the Collégiale Saint-Pierre-la-Cour of Le Mans on October 1654, aged about 30.

He became master of music at the Saint-Gatien Tours Cathedral from 1657 to 1661.

He competed and was rewarded at the puy de musique du Mans in 1657.

According to Chartier and Yvon, Boutry would have spent some time in Rouen as "master of music" and in Noyon as "master of the church".

He was hired as head of the chapel of the cathédrale Notre-Dame de Paris from 4 August 1662 to 20 October 1663. From this period, it is known he was granted a leave of absence for fifteen days without knowing the reason.

According to Granger (1996), he briefly returned to Chartres and was named a priest, before returning to Le Mans.

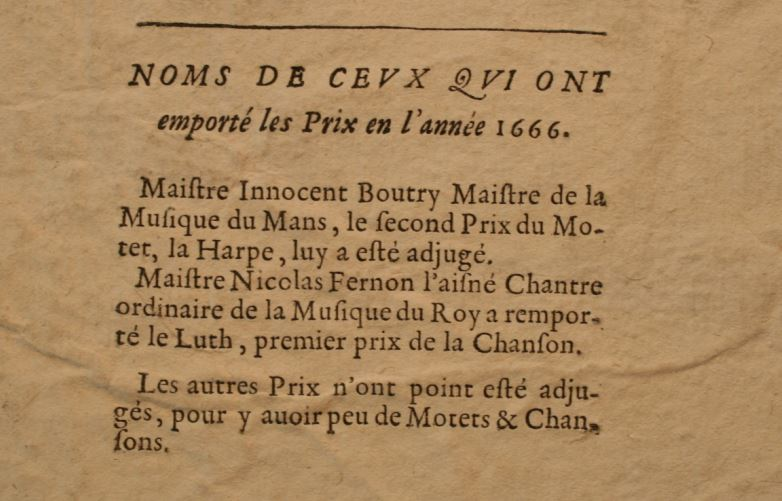
An extract from the poster of the Puy d'Évreux in 1667 (AD Eure : D 5)

He returned to Le Mans around Christmas 1664, where he succeeded Jean Colin as chapel master of the Saint-Julien cathedral. Shortly thereafter, he asked the Chapter to purchase a spinet. He remained there for five years and, in addition to his emoluments as a chapel master, he received 10 sols per day as vicar. He was also endowed in December 1665 with the chapel of Sainte-Marie-Madeleine, served in the church of Le Mans.

In 1666, Boutry competed at the puy de musique d’Évreux and received the silver harp and the second prize for the motet. In the same year, he was a judge at the puy de musique du Mans, having the two motets received sang and whose best was none other than Louis Bouteiller's one, then a child in the psallete he directed, "de facto" excluded from the competition.

In January 1670 he was admonished by the Chapter for not having led or brought the children back to church and for having missed the choir service, under threat of dismissal, which may be a sign of disagreement with the chapter. He then moved closer to the chapter of the collegiate church of Saint-Pierre-la-Cour, without respecting the hierarchical ways, and agreed with it to move on to its service as a chapel master (he had already worked there between 1654 and 1657). He was immediately dismissed by the St-Julien Cathedral chapter.

His commitment to Saint-Pierre is formalised on 26 January. There, he evicted François Fleury, hired two months earlier, who was probably not doing the job. The act of his commitment specifies that he had previously worked in Tours, at the Noyon Cathedral, at Notre-Dame de Paris, in addition to the cathedral Saint-Julien du Mans.

His service in Saint-Pierre-la-Cour gives some examples of the daily life of a chapel master. One month after his engagement, he got a chapter credit to buy a dozen music masses from Robert III Ballard. In July 1671, he was asked by the Chapter to provide for the replacement of a failing choirboy within a few weeks. In the summer of 1672, he was granted a two-week leave of absence to go to Paris to go to his business - we don't know which - in the company of his colleague Pierre Ribière.

He remained in St. Peter's until October 1676, not without being noticed several times for his strong character. Jean Mourot succeeded him.

At the end of October 1676, he was named canon of Pruillé l'Eguillé, a small village in the south-east of Le Mans.

He is still cited as a canon of the collegiate church of Saint-Calais in 1688. He died there c. 1690-1695.

== Works ==
We only know of two masses of Boutry, which appeared when he was in Tours:

- Missa quatuor vocum, ad imitationem moduli Speciosa facta es. Paris: Robert III Ballard, 1661. 2°, 14 f. RISM B 3950, Guillo 2003 n° 1661-G.

Transcription by Léna Gautier : Éditions du Centre de Musique Baroque de Versailles, 1997.

- Missa Magnus et mirabilis, 4 v. Paris : Robert III Ballard, 1661. 2°. Guillo 2003 n° 1661-F.

Lost edition, the existence of which is attested by several references in Ballard's catalogues. (in 1683, 1704, 1707, 1727, 1744). It must have appeared around 1661 but this date is not really attested.

His masse Speciosa facta es illustrates well the contemporary evolution of the style, with a very tonal counterpoint showing some Italianizing signs.

== Discography ==
- Mille ans de musique. Maîtrise de la cathédrale du Mans, dir. Philippe Lenoble. Pièces de Jehan Daniel, Jacques Peltier, Julien Belin, André Pechon, Innocent Boutry, Pierre Bouteiller et autres.1 CD Éditions Art et Musique, 2006, réf. B00139P31G.

== Sources ==
- Jean-Paul C. Montagnier, Les messes polyphoniques à Notre-Dame de Paris d’Innocent Boutry à Pierre Hugard, in La musique d’église et ses cadres de création dans la France d’Ancien Régime, ed. Cécile Davy-Rigaux. - Firenze : Olschki, 2013 p. 197-215.
- Laurent Guillo. La figure de Cécile : enquête sur l’affiche du puy d’Évreux de 1667 in Imago musicæ 24 (2011), p. 113-126.
- Sylvie Granger, Les métiers de la musique en pays manceau et fléchois du XVIIe au XIXe siècle (1661-1850). Thèse pour le Doctorat d'Histoire, Université du Maine, 1996, 2 vol. Read here and there. Elements have been included in Sylvie Granger, Dans les villes de l’Ouest : des musiciens venus d’ailleurs… XVIIe-XVIIIe siècle), Annales de Bretagne et des Pays de l’Ouest 112-3 (2005), Read online.
- D. Launay, La musique religieuse en France du Concile de Trente à 1804. - Paris: Société française de Musicologie, 1993.
- Léna Gautier, Innocent Boutry et la messe Speciosa facta es : biographie, transcription, analyse. Musicology dissertation under the direction of Raphaëlle Legrand, Tours University, 1993. 2 vol., 120 p. (available at the CMBV).
- Anne-Marie Yvon, La maîtrise de Notre-Dame de Paris aux XVIIe et XVIIIe siècles, Le 8e centenaire de Notre-Dame, congrès de mai-juin 1964.
- François Léon Chartier. L’ancien chapitre de Notre-Dame de Paris et sa maîtrise d’après les capitulaires (1326-1790) avec un appendice musical.... Paris: 1897.
- Emmanuel-Louis Chambois. La fête de Sainte-Cécile à la cathédrale du Mans 1633-1748. Le Mans: Leguicheux, 1894.
- F. L. Chartier, L’ancien chapitre de Notre-Dame de Paris et sa maîtrise d’après les documents capitulaires (1326–1790). - Paris: 1887.
- P. A. Anjubault, La Sainte-Cécile du Mans de 1633 à 1784. - Le Mans: 1862.
- Beauhaire, Chronologie des évêques, des curés, des vicaires du diocèse de Chartres, Ms. Bibl. de Chartres.
