= Télémaque (Destouches) =

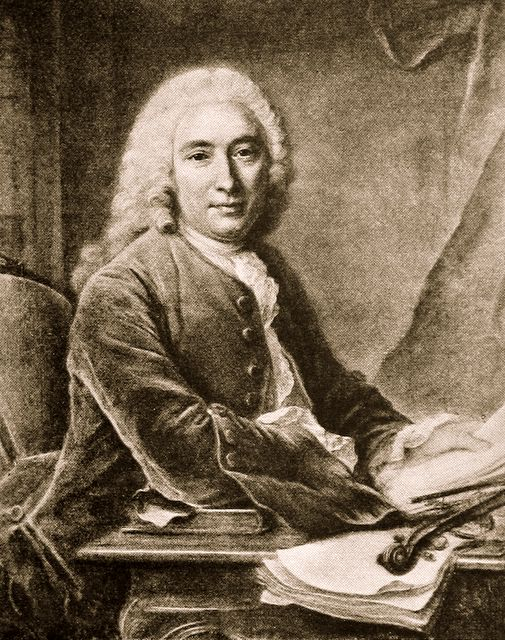
Composer André Cardinal Destouches

Télémaque et Calypso (Telemachus and Calypso), also Télémaque or [French: ou] Calypso, is an opera by the French composer André Cardinal Destouches, first performed at the Académie Royale de Musique (the Paris Opera) on 29 November 1714. It takes the form of a tragédie en musique in a prologue and five acts.

The libretto is by Simon-Joseph Pellegrin. The plot is taken from Les Aventures de Télémaque by François Fénelon, itself adapted from Homer's Telemachy: Telemachus is shipwrecked while searching for his father Ulysses, and resists seduction by the sea-nymph Calypso because of his love for the shepherdess Eucharis. The opera was imitated by a number of other Italian and French versions, including Telemaco by Alessandro Scarlatti and Carlo Sigismondo Capece.

== Recording ==
Destouches: Telemaque & Calypso. Emmanuelle de Negri, Isabelle Druet, Margaux Blanchard, Antonin Rondepierre, Les Chantres Du Centre de Musique Baroque de Versailles Les Ombres, Sylvain Sartre 2CD 2024 Château de Versailles

== Sources ==
- (in French) Libretto at "Livres baroques"
- (in French) Félix Clément and Pierre Larousse Dictionnaire des Opéras, Paris, 1881
