= Les élémens =

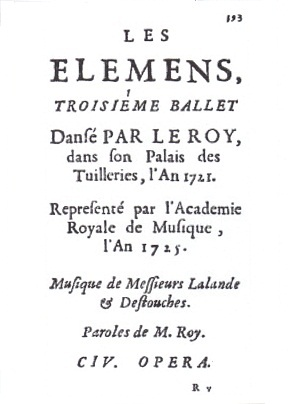
Title page of the 1725 libretto (Recueil général des opéra, 1734)

Les Élémens (The Elements), or Ballet des élémens, is an opéra-ballet by the French composers André Cardinal Destouches and Michel Richard Delalande (or de Lalande). It has a prologue and four entrées (as well as, originally, a celebratory epilogue later removed). The libretto was written by Pierre-Charles Roy. It was styled "the third ballet danced by the king" because the 11-year-old Louis XV performed dance divertissements in it, as he had already done in the previous ballets, L'inconnu by various authors (including Delalande and Destouches), and Les folies de Cardenio by Delalande, both staged at court in 1720.

== Composition ==
Destouches was responsible for most of the music. It has never been ascertained how much each composer contributed to the composition. In a 1726 letter, Destouches wrote to Antonio I, Prince of Monaco: "We were ordered to work in partnership; he [Delalande] wrote very fine things whose details I implore you to spare me, for he demanded of me that we be covered by the same cloak". Delalande probably wrote the overture, much of the prologue and some parts of the first entrée. Jean Balon provided the choreography.

Les Élémens has the typical structure of the opéra-ballet: its four entrées are musically and dramatically independent, but topically related to one another. Its subject matter, however – gods, heroes and ancient Romans – relates it more to the special type of opéra-ballet called "ballet-héroïque".

== Performance history ==
The opera was first performed at the Tuileries, Paris on 31 December 1721, with the 11-year-old Louis XV participating in the dancing. The king was quite bored with it and it did not meet with general appreciation. It was, however, revived four times at court in the next two months. According to Destouches himself, "at its first appearance this ballet was by no means the success we hoped for. It was found to be long; it seemed to be too serious; it was danced by noble youths whose talents were not up to the highest standards. Which caused very unpleasant boredom that was most humiliating for the authors".

After being extensively rearranged (all the parts featuring the King were for instance removed), on 29 May 1725 the ballet was revived before the general public by the Paris Opera at the Palais-Royal theatre. It met thereafter with increasing success, the degree of which "may be gauged by the fact that it remained in the repertory for more than 50 years and was revived in 1727, 1734, 1742, 1767, 1771, 1776, 1778, and 1780", and that it inspired "three parodies: Momus exilé (1725) at the Théâtre des Italiens; Le chaos (1725) at the same theatre; Il était temps (1754) at the Saint-Laurent fair". The prologue and two entrées ("Air" and "Fire") were also revived at Madame de Pompadour's Théâtre des Petits Appartements, on the Grand Escalier des Ambassadeurs in the Palace of Versailles, on 23 December 1748 and 9 January 1749, with Madame de Pompadour herself performing the role of Emilie. In a further revival of the entrée of the "Earth" on next 15 January she also performed the role of Pomone.

Les Élémens was Destouches's most successful work, and his master Delalande's only stage work to appear at the Paris Opéra. At court it "marked the end of several eras: it was Lalande's final stage work, Louis XV's last stage appearance and the final French court ballet".

There was a modern revival at the Opéra Royal de Versailles on 7 October 2001 under Jérôme Corréas, with Isabelle Poulenard, Françoise Masset, Jean-François Lombard, Matthieu Lecroart, and Renaud Delaigue.

== Roles ==
Role	Voice type	Cast of premiere (according to the original libretto) (31 December 1721)	Cast of Palais-Royal revival (according to the original libretto) (29 May 1725)
Conductor		Jean-Féry Rebel	
Prologue: "Chaos" (Le Chaos)
Destiny	basse-taille (bass-baritone)	Gabriel-Vincent Thévenard	Gabriel-Vincent Thévenard
Vénus	soprano	Marie-Gabrielle Lizarde	Mlle Lambert
A Grace	soprano		Mlle Mignier
First entrée: "Air" (l'Air)
Junon	soprano	Marie Antier	Marie Antier
Ixion	basse-taille	Gabriel-Vincent Thévenard	Gabriel-Vincent Thévenard
Jupiter	basse-taille	Justin Destouches du Bourg (Dubourg)	Claude-Louis-Dominique Chassé de Chinais
Mercure	haute-contre	Louis Murayre (Muraire)	Denis-François Tribou
A Hora	soprano		Mlle Mignier
Second entrée: "Water" (l'Eau)
Leucosie	soprano	Mlle Erémans (Erremans, Hermance)	Mlle Erémans
Doris	soprano	Mlle Souris "l’Aînée" (the elder)	Mlle Souris "l’Aînée" (the elder)
Arion	haute-contre	Antoine Boutelou	Louis Murayre
Neptune	basse-taille	Justin Destouches du Bourg	Justin Destouches du Bourg
a triton	basse taille	Dun fils	
Third entrée: "Fire" (le Feu)
Émilie	soprano	Marie Antier	Marie Antier
Valère	basse-taille	Gabriel-Vincent Thévenard	Gabriel-Vincent Thévenard
L'Amour	soprano	Cathérine-Nicole Le Maure (Lemaure)	Mlle Dun
Fourth entrée: "Earth" (la Terre)
Pomone	soprano	Marie Antier	Cathérine-Nicole Le Maure
Vertumne	haute-contre	Antoine Boutelou	Louis Murayre
Plutus	haute-contre	Louis Murayre	
Pan	basse-taille	Dun fils	Claude-Louis-Dominique Chassé de Chinais
Two sheperdesses (but one in the 1725 version)	soprano(s)	Mlles Constance and Catin	Mlle Mignier
Epilogue (only in the first version)
Pomone	soprano	Marie Antier	
A Nymph from Pomone's retinu	soprano	Mlle de S. Estienne	

== Synopsis ==
The following synopsis is based on Pitou (1985).

=== Prologue: Chaos ===
After Destiny makes the elements replace chaos, Venus complains about her exclusion from the undertaking, Destiny mollifies her by showing her future son, Louis XV, who is celebrated by a chorus and is committed to the elements' favour.

In the 1721 version, the king in person appeared in the prologue performing the dance divertissement along with twelve other young noble courtiers.

=== 1st entrée: Air ===
Aroused by Mercure to be less aloof, Ixion refuses Junon's order to spy upon unfaithful Jupiter's movements and instead declares his love for her. This provokes a terrible fit of anger on her part. As a punishment, Jupiter will consign him to the depths of Hades.

=== 2nd entrée: Water ===
After refusing to marry Eole on account of his bad temper, and because she already loves a stranger from afar, Leucosie welcomes Arion, the stranger she loves, who has arrived on the back of a dolphin, to Neptune's palace. Arion too falls in love with Leucosie. Neptune recognizes him as his own son and orders his marriage to Leucosie.

=== 3rd entrée: Fire ===
This entrée is set in the vestibule of the temple of Vesta, where the priestess Emilie attends to the goddess's fire for the last time, having received permission to marry Valère. When Valère comes to the temple, Emilie tells him that she had a nightmare in which Vesta had appeared with a great crash, mad with rage, and had struck him dead by lightning. While Valère is trying to reassure her, the temple plunges into darkness, as the sacred fire has gone out: Emilie takes the blame for neglecting it and refuses to flee with her lover, bravely willing to face her deadly punishment. However, Cupid appears over a cloud, relights the sacred fire and blesses the wedding of his two followers.

=== 4th entrée: Earth ===
Pomone seems to disregard love, so Vertumne, who is in love with her, disguises himself as a woman, Nérine, in order to be allowed to approach her. In this disguise, Vertumne witnesses Pomone rejecting Pan's approaches, and then is made aware by her of her secret love for him. He reveals himself and the entrée ends in a ballet and chorus celebrating Love.

=== Epilogue ===
The 1721 first version also included an 'Epilogue' that again presented on stage the king and the twelve young courtiers who had danced with him in the 'Prologue', as well as four other high noblemen each flanked by a ballerina: they were to symbolize the Sun advancing in his chariot, surrounded by the signs of the zodiac and followed by the four continents. The opera concluded in jubilation with Pomone and a follower of hers – accompanied by the general chorus of all the other performers – hymning the praises of the Sun and Louis XV at the same time.

== Recordings ==
Excerpts from the work have been recorded by:

- the Academy of Ancient Music, conducted by Christopher Hogwood, Decca (L'Oiseau-Lyre) 475 9100 (CD). 2008 (recorded 1978).
- the Ensemble Les Surprises, conducted by Louis-Noël Bestion de Camboulas, Ambronay AMY046 (CD) 2018
