= André Cardinal Destouches =

French composer (1672–1749)

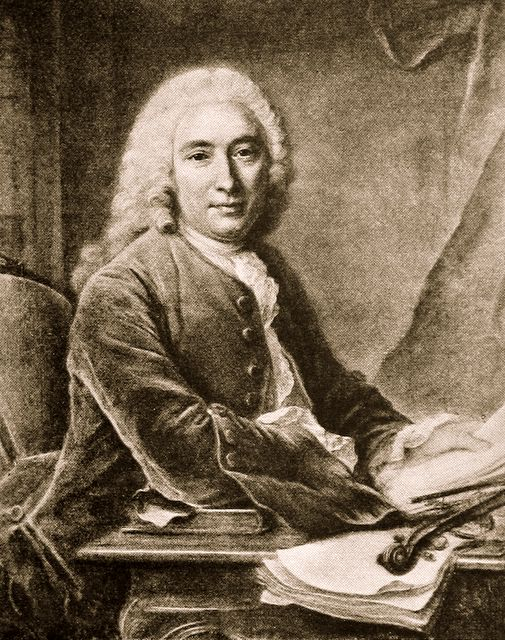
- Born: 6 April 1672; Paris, Kingdom of France
- Died: 7 February 1749 (aged 76); Paris
- Era: Baroque

André Cardinal Destouches (sometimes called des Touches) (baptised 6 April 1672 – 7 February 1749) was a French composer best known for the opéra-ballet Les élémens.

== Biography ==
Born in Paris, the son of Étienne Cardinal, a wealthy merchant, André Cardinal was educated by Jesuits. With the Jesuit Father Guy Tachard, he went on a mission to Siam for two years, leaving in January 1687, and spending some time at the Cape of Good Hope, arriving in Siam in September. Coming back to France, in September 1688, he spent several months at the academy in the Manège royal, rue de Tournon. In 1692 he joined the army and participated in the invasion of Namur, discovering his musical talent while not occupied by combat. When his father died in August 1694, André Cardinal added "Destouches" to his name in memory of his father's title, Seigneur des Touches et de Guilleville. He quit the army in 1696 to pursue his musical aspirations.

Destouches' opera Issé was performed for Louis XIV at the Trianon in 1697. Louis was impressed and said that he enjoyed his music as much as that of Jean-Baptiste Lully. The opera was successfully repeated at the Opéra a few weeks later. The following year found him dining with Boileau in the company of Racine.

After a series of successful operas and the commencement of his successful collaboration with the librettist Pierre-Charles Roy, in 1713 the king appointed Destouches inspector general of the Académie Royale de Musique, at a stipend of 4000 livres a year; later, in 1725 Louis XV would appoint him superintendent of chamber music for the Chambre du Roi, and then Director of the Académie. Under the Régence, as Destouches' operas were revived at the Opéra, Destouches was able to purchase the terroir of La Vaudoire at Sartrouville, conveniently close to Paris. The young Louis XV danced in Destouches' ballet Les élémens (Note: Also written as Les éléments, with 't'.) at the Théâtre des Tuileries, 31 December 1721, (Note: It was published in 1725.) and the aged Destouches led the musicians for his daughters' masked ball on 13 January 1744. With the beginning of the public Concerts Spirituels in Paris, Destouches performed his De Profundis (1725) and his cantata Sémélé (1728) and motet for large chorus O dulcis Jesu (also 1728); Queen Maria Leszczyńska commanded Destouches to recreate the concert series at the Tuileries. With the death of Michel Richard Delalande in 1726, Destouches assumed control of the Musique du Roi.

In 1724 he married Anne-Antoinette de Reynold de la Ferrière. He was buried in the crypt of Saint-Roch, Paris.

== Works ==
- Issé (pastorale héroïque), libretto by Antoine Houdar de la Motte (1697, in five acts 1708) Issé played at Wolfenbüttel (in German) and The Hague.
- Amadis de Grèce (tragédie en musique), libretto by La Motte (26 March 1699)
- Marthésie (tragédie en musique), libretto by La Motte (11 October 1699)
- Omphale (tragédie en musique), libretto by La Motte (10 November 1701)
- Le Carnaval et la folie (comédie-ballet), libretto by La Motte (3 January 1704). The work was recreated in 2007 at the Académie d'Ambronay, directed by Hervé Niquet, staged by Jacques Osinski and produced by the Centre Culturel d'Ambronay and the Théâtre de Reims.
- Callirhoé (tragédie en musique), libretto by Pierre-Charles Roy (27 December 1712). Recorded by Hervé Niquet and Le Concert Spirituel for Glossa.
- Télémaque (tragédie en musique), libretto by the abbé Simon-Joseph Pellegrin (29 November 1714), recreated at the Ambronay Festival (2023) by the ensemble Les Ombres.
- Oenone (cantata) for solo voice with symphony, text by La Motte (February 1716). The work was recreated in 2009 at the Ambronay Festival by the ensemble Les Ombres.
- Sémiramis (tragédie en musique), libretto by Pierre-Charles Roy (4 December 1718)
- Sémélé, cantata for solo voice with symphony, text by La Motte (1719). The work was recreated in 2009 at the Ambronay Festival by the ensemble Les Ombres.
- Les élémens (opéra-ballet), in collaboration with Delalande, libretto by Roy (1721)
- Les stratagèmes de l'amour (ballet), libretto by Pierre-Charles Roy (26 March 1726).

== Discography ==
- Le Carnaval et La Folie, Les Eléments, Ensemble Baroque de Limoges, dir. Jean-Michel Hasler. CD Lyrinx, 1986
- Omphale, Callirhoé, Suites instrumentales, Ensemble Baroque de Limoges, dir. Jean-Michel Hasler. CD Ades 1990
- Callirhoé : Cyril Auvity, Stéphanie d'Oustrac, Callirhoé, Cyril Auvity, Agénor, João Fernandes, Corésus, Ingrid Perruche, La Reine, Renaud Delaigue, Le Ministre, Stéphanie Révidat, Une Princesse de Calypso, Une Bergère, Le Concert Spirituel, conducted by Hervé Niquet. 2 CD Glossa 2007.
- Les Éléments, excerpts, The Academy of Ancient Music, conducted by Christopher Hogwood, Decca (L'Oiseau-Lyre) 475 9100 (CD). 2008.
- Sémélé, cantate à voix seule avec symphonie, Les Ombres. CD Mirare, 2014
- Les Éléments : excerpts, Ensemble Les Surprises, conducted by L-N Bestion de Camboulas. CD Ambronay 2018
- Issé : Judith van Wanroij, Issé, Chantal Santon-Jeffery, Doris, Eugénie Lefebvre, La première Hespéride, une Nymphe, une Dryade, Mathias Vidal, Apollon (sous les traits du berger Philémon), Thomas Dolié, Hylas, Matthieu Lécroart, Jupiter, Pan,Etienne Bazola, Hercule, le Grand Prêtre, Stéphen Collardelle, un Berger, Le Sommeil, l'OracleLes Chantres du Centre de musique baroque de Versailles, Ensemble Les Surprises, conducted by Louis-Noël Bestion de Camboulas. 2 CD Ambronay éditions 2019. Diapason d’or.
- Sémiramis : Eléonore Pancrazi, Sémiramis, Emmanuelle De Negri, Amestris, Mathias Vidal, Arsane, Thibault de Damas, Zoroastre, David Witczak, L'Oracle, L'Ordonnateur des jeux funèbres, Judith Fa, Babylonienne, Prêtresse, Clément Debieuvre, Babylonien, Génie, Choeur du Concert Spirituel, Les Ombres, conducted by Sylvain Sartre. 2 CD Château de Versailles Spectacles 038. 2021. (The Prologue was not recorded).
- Telemaque & Calypso: Emmanuelle de Negri, Isabelle Druet, Margaux Blanchard, Antonin Rondepierre, Les Chantres Du Centre de Musique Baroque de Versailles Les Ombres, Sylvain Sartre 2CD 2024 Château de Versailles
