= Joseph Michel (composer) =

French chorister, composer and music teacher (1679-1736)

Joseph Michel (1679–1736) was an 18th-century French baroque chorister, composer and music teacher of the Sainte Chapelle of Dijon, demolished in 1802. A contemporary of Jean-Philippe Rameau, his reputation extended far beyond the boundaries of the city of Versailles and the Province of Burgundy.

Born at Bay-sur-Aube, and educated at the Jesuit college of Godrans, Michel was a pupil of Pierre Menault and also for a few years, of Jean-Philippe Rameau, organist at the Church of Notre-Dame of Dijon. Michel became priest in 1705 and, by an agreement between him and the Chapter on 28 December 1709, choirmaster to the Sainte-Chapelle du Roi in Dijon, where he became a Canon in 1717.

== Compositional style ==
Michel's grand motets like Dominus regnavit exultet terra, which came into the repertoire of the "Chapelle du Roi" in Versailles and remained there until 1792, are characteristic of the second half of the reign of Louis XIV. They cover a large instrumental ensemble consisting of flute, bassoon and a five-part string orchestra (violon, haute-contre, taille, quinte and basses de violon). The upper voices consisted of two dessus, hautes-contres, tailles, and basse-taille for the soloists, and dessus, hautes-contre, tailles, basses-tailles and basses for the choir.

His Leçons de ténèbres (Lessons of Darkness) were the last examples to be printed during the first half of the 18th century, although the bulk of his compositions were destroyed in a fire at his printer in 1735, the year before his death. In his later works, one can clearly see the emerging galant style in his music. From a letter in the archives of Versailles, it is clear that Michel intended to become kapellmeister for the royal court, but his premature death prevented this.

=== Works, editions and recordings ===
- Domine in virtute tua
- Miserere
- Leçons de Jérémie (1935)
- Dominus regnavit exultet terra
- Quid retribuam tibi
- Leçons de ténèbres - recorded by (1) Hervé Niquet and Le Concert Spirituel for Naxos in 1997, (2) Hervé Lamy, Mundo Corde 2012.

== See also ==
- Les Vingt-quatre Violons du Roi
- Jean-Baptiste Lully

== Additional informations ==
=== Sources ===
- "MICHEL, Joseph (1679-1736)". Centre de Musique Baroque de Versailles (in French).

=== References ===
Attribution

- This article is based on the translation of the corresponding article of the German Wikipedia. A list of contributors can be found there at the History section.
