= Châbons =

- Commune
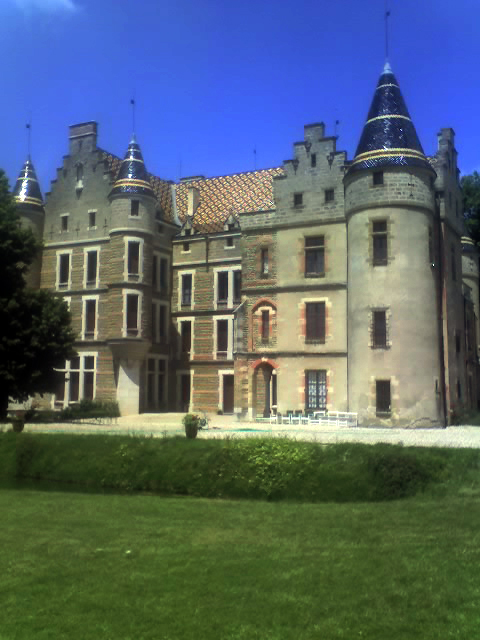
- Chateau of Pupetières

- Coat of arms
- Location of Châbons
- Location within France Location within Auvergne-Rhône-Alpes
- Coordinates: 45°26′41″N 5°25′54″E
- Country: France
- Region: Auvergne-Rhône-Alpes
- Department: Isère
- Arrondissement: La Tour-du-Pin
- Canton: Le Grand-Lemps
- Intercommunality: Bièvre Est

Government
  - Mayor (2020–2026): Marie-Pierre Barani
- Area^{1}: 18.14 km^{2} (7.00 sq mi)
- Highest elevation: 687 m (2,254 ft)
- Lowest elevation: 386 m (1,266 ft)
- Population (2023): 2,133
  - Density: 117.6/km^{2} (304.5/sq mi)
- Time zone: UTC+01:00 (CET)
  - Summer (DST): UTC+02:00 (CEST)
- INSEE/Postal code: 38065 /38690
- ^{1} French Land Register data, which excludes lakes, ponds, glaciers > 1 km^{2} (0.386 sq mi or 247 acres) and river estuaries.

Châbons (French pronunciation: [ʃabɔ̃]) is a commune in the Isère department in southeastern France.

== Geography ==
The Bourbre forms part of the commune's southeastern border and then flows north through the eastern part of the commune.

== Climate ==
In 2010, the commune's climate was classified as a mountain margin climate, according to a study by the National Centre for Scientific Research based on a series of data covering the period 1971-2000. In 2020, Météo-France published a typology of the climates of metropolitan France in which the commune is exposed to a mountain or mountain margin climate and is in the Northern Alps climate region, characterized by an annual rainfall of 1,200 to 1,500 mm, irregularly distributed in summer.

For the period 1971-2000, the average annual temperature was 10.5 °C, with an annual temperature range of 17.5 °C. The average annual rainfall was 1,141 mm, with 9.7 days of precipitation in January and 6.7 days in July.

== Population ==
Historical population

Year	Pop.	±% p.a.
1793	2,051	—
1800	1,934	−0.84%
1806	2,215	+2.29%
1821	2,415	+0.58%
1831	2,233	−0.78%
1836	2,243	+0.09%
1841	2,268	+0.22%
1846	2,020	−2.29%
1851	2,039	+0.19%
1856	1,908	−1.32%
1861	1,897	−0.12%
1866	1,986	+0.92%
1872	1,943	−0.36%
1876	1,945	+0.03%
1881	1,860	−0.89%
1886	1,864	+0.04%
1891	1,822	−0.45%
1896	1,748	−0.83%
1901	1,756	+0.09%

Year	Pop.	±% p.a.
1906	1,725	−0.36%
1911	1,725	+0.00%
1921	1,568	−0.95%
1926	1,521	−0.61%
1931	1,502	−0.25%
1936	1,383	−1.64%
1946	1,353	−0.22%
1954	1,295	−0.55%
1962	1,261	−0.33%
1968	1,178	−1.13%
1975	1,202	+0.29%
1982	1,282	+0.92%
1990	1,371	+0.84%
1999	1,485	+0.89%
2007	1,732	+1.94%
2012	1,978	+2.69%
2017	2,075	+0.96%
2023	2,133	+0.46%

Source: EHESS and INSEE (1968-2023)

== See also ==
- Communes of the Isère department
