= Louis Le Prince (composer) =

French priest and composer

Louis-Nicolas Le Prince (died Ferrières-Saint-Hilaire, 1677) was a French priest and composer. He was maître de chapelle at Lisieux Cathedral, then from 1668 priest at Ferrières-Saint-Hilaire.

== Works ==
- Missa Macula non est in te (1663)
- Nicolas le Prince, Airs spirituels sur la parafrase du Laudate de coelis, composés à 3 vois pareilles, Ballard Paris 1671.

== Sources ==
Jean-Paul C. Montagnier, The Polyphonic Mass in France, 1600-1780: The Evidence of the Printed Choirbooks, Cambridge: Cambridge University Press, 2017.
