= François Henri, comte de Virieu =

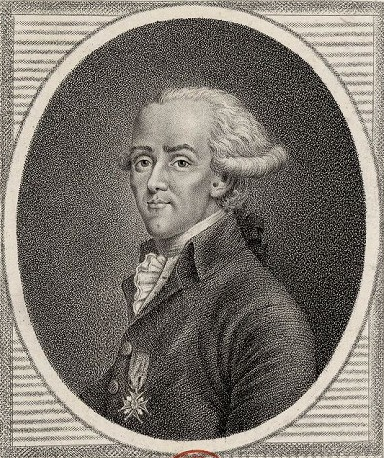

François-Henri, comte de Virieu (13 August 1754 – 9 October 1793) was a French nobleman and a statesman of the French Revolution, at first a supporter of its efforts, later an agent of counter-revolution.

== Biography ==
The comte de Virieu, son of Louis-François-René de Virieu, was a Freemason who was born in Grenoble who participated in the 1782 Convent of Wilhelmsbad where he assisted in the development of masonic rituals, a particular convent that figures in conspiracy theories regarding the origin of the Illuminati.

He was elected by the Estates of the Dauphiné (along with Jean Joseph Mounier and Antoine Barnave) to the Estates General of 1789, as one of their representatives to the Second Estate.

He joined the counter-revolution after the declaration of the French Republic in September 1792. He, along with other dissident nobles such as the comte de Clermont-Tonnerre fought under the comte de Précy and assisted the efforts of the city of Lyon to resist the new regime as colonel of the Royal-Limousin regiment.

He died in 1793 in Lyon.
