= Pierre Bouteiller =

French Baroque composer

Pierre Bouteiller (1655–1717) was a French Baroque composer. His surviving works comprise 13 petits motets and a requiem for 5 voices and basso continuo.

== Works, editions and recordings ==
- Missa pro defunctis. O felix et dilecte conviva; Tantum ergo; O salutaris hostia; O fidelis et dilecte commensalis; Consideratio de vanitate mundi. Suzie LeBlanc, Stephan van Dyck, Les Voix Humaines. Atma, 2003
- Missa pro defunctis. Glossa, 2010
