= Orpheus (Telemann) =

Opera by Georg Philipp Telemann

- Opera by Georg Philipp Telemann
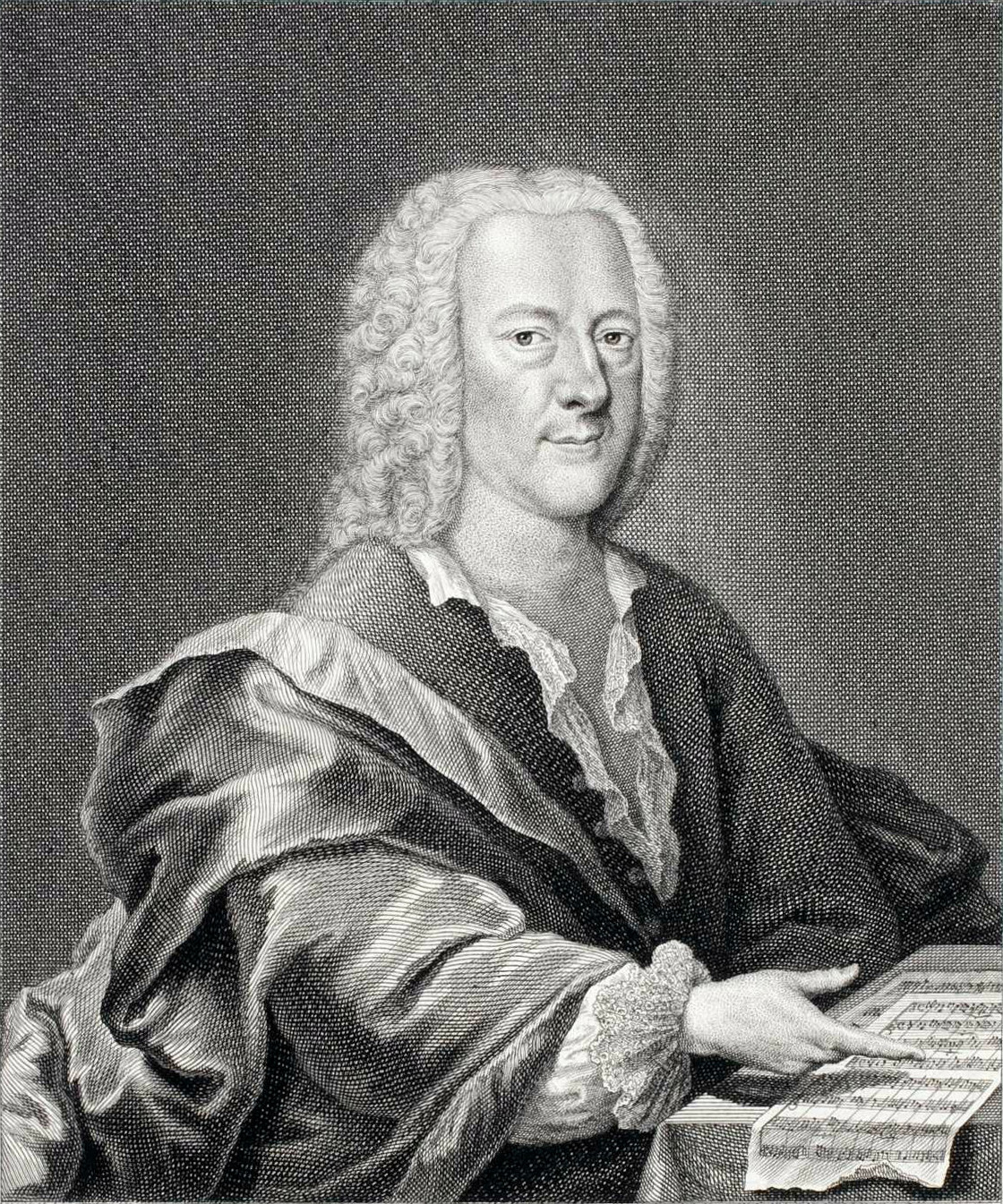
- The composer, c. 1745
- Translation: The Wonderful Constancy of Love, or Orpheus
- Other title: Die wunderbare Beständigkeit der Liebe oder Orpheus
- Language: German
- Based on: Michel Duboullay's Orphée (1690)
- Premiere: 9 March 1726 (in concert); Oper am Gänsemarkt, Hamburg

Orpheus (full title: Die wunderbare Beständigkeit der Liebe oder Orpheus, The Wonderful Constancy of Love, or Orpheus) is an opera in three acts by the German composer Georg Philipp Telemann. It was first performed in a concert version at the Oper am Gänsemarkt in Hamburg on 9 March 1726. The anonymous libretto is based on the 1690 opera Orphée by Michel Duboullay, originally set by the French composer Louis Lully. Most of the work is in German but it also contains passages in French and Italian drawn from famous operas by Handel and Jean-Baptiste Lully. The music to these words is Telemann's own, however. The manuscript score of Telemann's Orpheus was not rediscovered until the late 20th century.

== Roles ==
Roles, voice types
Role	Voice type
Orpheus	baritone
Orasia	soprano
Eurydice	soprano
Ismene	soprano
Eurimedes	tenor
Cephisa	soprano
Pluto	bass
Ascalax	castrato (contralto)

== Synopsis ==
Act 1
Queen Orasia of Thrace is in love with Orpheus, but he rejects her in favour of Eurydice. The queen plots to kill Eurydice as she is picking flowers in a garden. Orpheus tells his friend Eurimedes he is tired of life at Orasia's court and flees to the countryside. Eurydice is bitten by a snake and dies in Orpheus's arms.
Act 2
Orpheus descends to the underworld to rescue Eurydice. He charms the king of the underworld, Pluto, with his music. The god allows him to return with Eurydice on condition he does not look back at her until they have reached the land of the living once more. Orpheus fails in this task and Eurydice is lost to him.
Act 3
Orasia believes that, with Eurydice gone, Orpheus will love her. But the grieving Orpheus rejects her advances. Orasia is furious and vows revenge. She urges on the followers of Bacchus to kill Orpheus. Orasia repents of what she has done when she sees a vision of the dead Orpheus reunited with Eurydice. In despair, she kills herself.

== Recordings ==
- Orpheus Dorothea Röschmann (Orasia), Roman Trekel (Orpheus), Ruth Ziesak (Eurydice), Werner Güra (Eurimenides), María Cristina Kiehr, RIAS Kammerchor, Akademie für Alte Musik Berlin, conducted by René Jacobs (Harmonia Mundi, 1998)
- Orpheus Markus Volpert (Orfeo), Dorothee Mields (Orasia), Ulrike Hofbauer (Eurydice), Christian Zenker (Eurimedes), Reinhard Mayr (Pluto). L'Orfeo Barockorchester, Michi Gaigg DHM 2011
