= French opera =

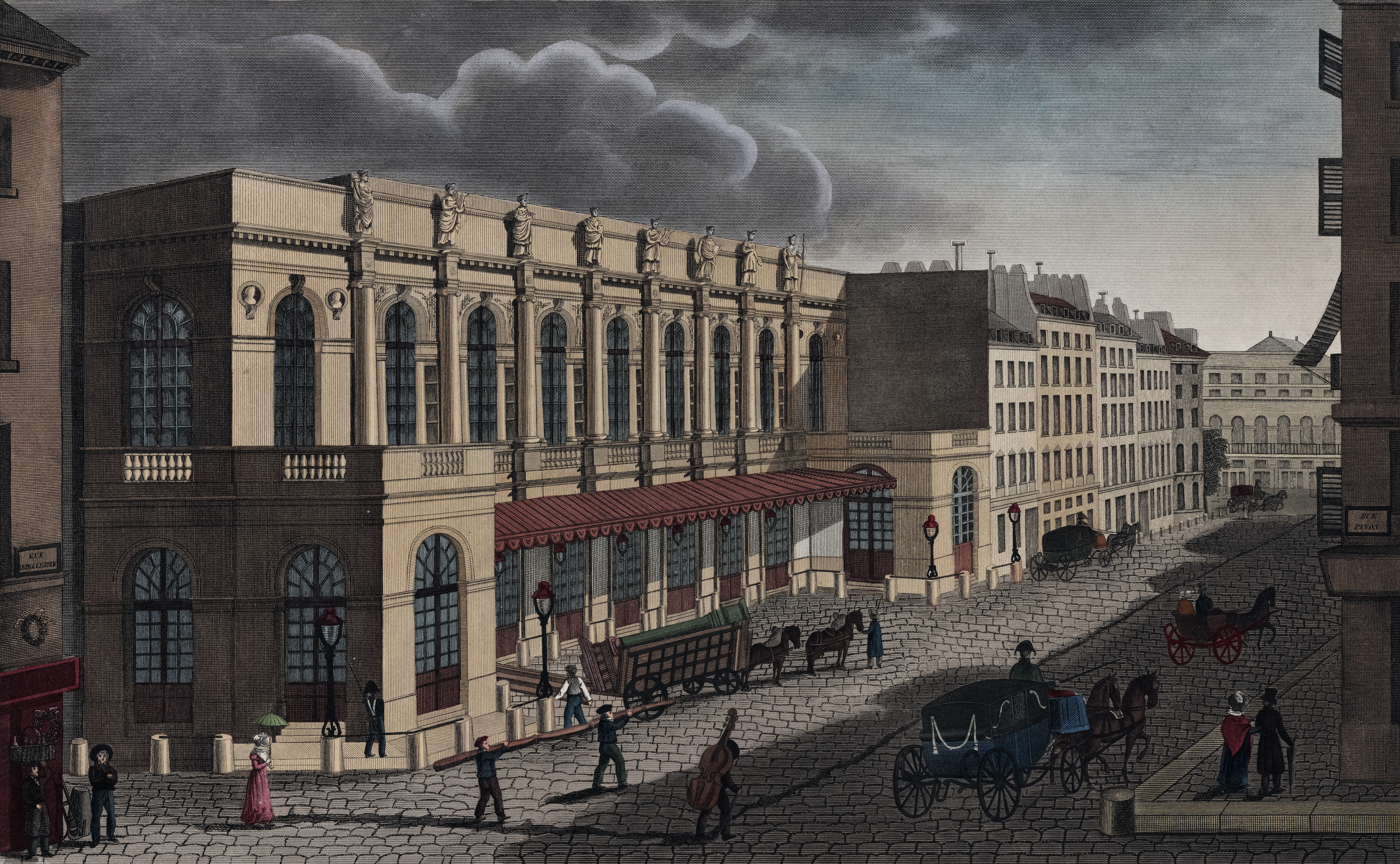
The Salle Le Peletier, home of the Paris Opera during the middle of the 19th century

French opera is both the art of opera in France and opera in the French language. It is one of Europe's most important operatic traditions, containing works by composers of the stature of Rameau, Berlioz, Gounod, Bizet, Massenet, Debussy, Ravel, Poulenc and Messiaen. Many foreign-born composers have played a part in the French tradition, including Lully, Gluck, Salieri, Cherubini, Spontini, Meyerbeer, Rossini, Donizetti, Verdi and Offenbach.

French opera began at the court of Louis XIV with Jean-Baptiste Lully's Cadmus et Hermione (1673), although there had been various experiments with the form before that, most notably Pomone by Robert Cambert. Lully and his librettist Quinault created tragédie en musique, a form in which dance music and choral writing were particularly prominent. Lully's most important successor was Rameau. After Rameau's death, Christoph Willibald Gluck was persuaded to produce six operas for the Paris Opera in the 1770s. They show the influence of Rameau, but simplified and with greater focus on the drama. At the same time, by the middle of the 18th century another genre was gaining popularity in France: opéra comique, in which arias alternated with spoken dialogue. By the 1820s, Gluckian influence in France had given way to a taste for the operas of Rossini. Rossini's Guillaume Tell helped found the new genre of Grand opera, a form whose most famous exponent was Giacomo Meyerbeer. Lighter opéra comique also enjoyed tremendous success in the hands of Boieldieu, Auber, Hérold and Adam. In this climate, the operas of Hector Berlioz struggled to gain a hearing. Berlioz's epic masterpiece Les Troyens, the culmination of the Gluckian tradition, was not given a full performance for almost a hundred years after it was written.

In the second half of the 19th century, Jacques Offenbach dominated the new genre of operetta with witty and cynical works such as Orphée aux enfers; Charles Gounod scored a massive success with Faust; and Georges Bizet composed Carmen, probably the most famous French opera of all. At the same time, the influence of Richard Wagner was felt as a challenge to the French tradition. Perhaps the most interesting response to Wagnerian influence was Claude Debussy's only operatic masterpiece Pelléas et Mélisande (1902). Other notable 20th-century names include Ravel, Poulenc and Messiaen.

== The birth of French opera: Lully ==
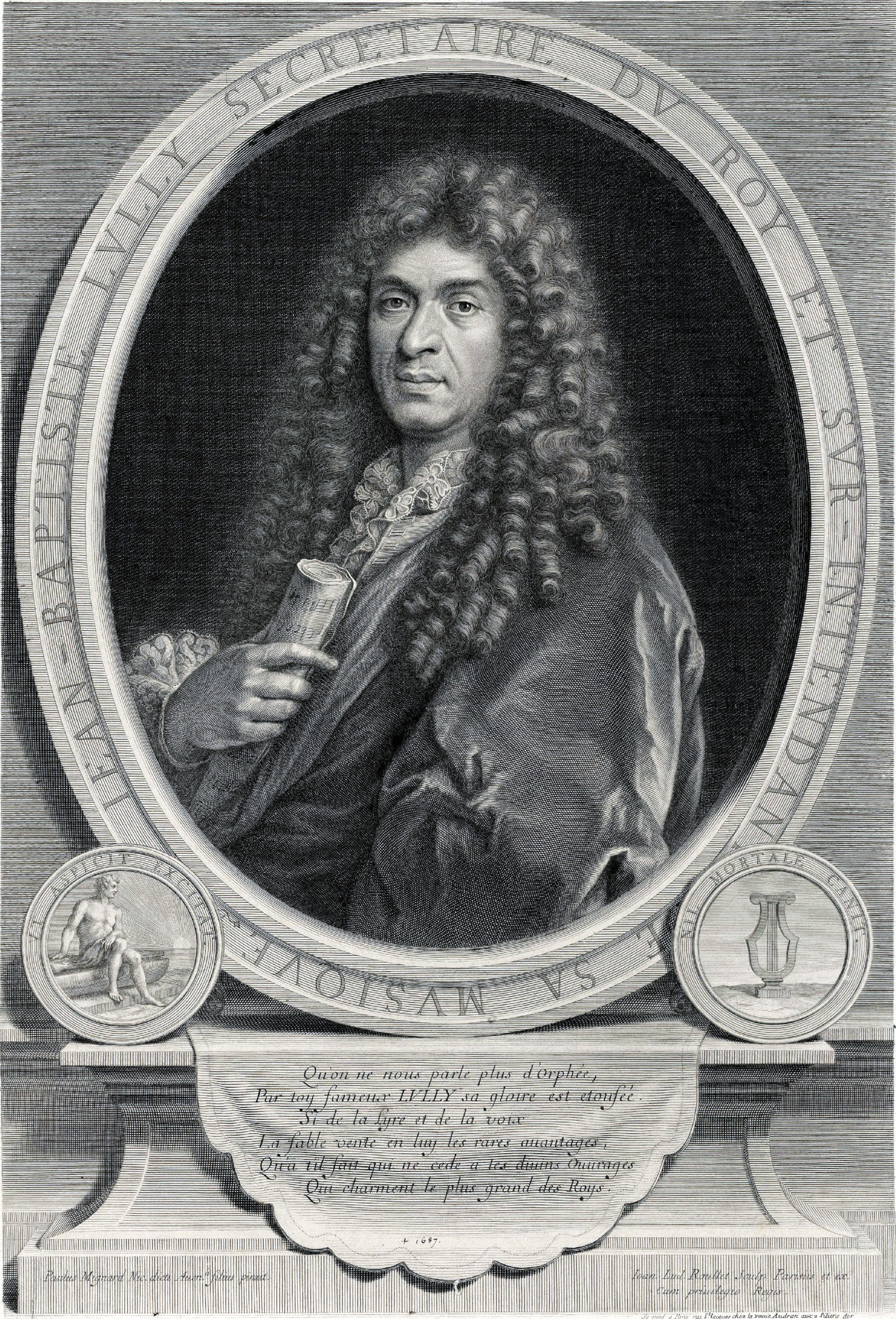
Jean-Baptiste Lully, the "Father of French Opera"

The first operas to be staged in France were imported from Italy, beginning with Francesco Sacrati's La finta pazza in 1645. French audiences gave them a lukewarm reception. This was partly for political reasons, since these operas were promoted by the Italian-born Cardinal Mazarin, who was then first minister during the regency of the young Louis XIV and a deeply unpopular figure with large sections of French society. Musical considerations also played a role, since the French court already had a firmly established genre of stage music, ballet de cour, which included sung elements as well as dance and lavish spectacle. When two Italian operas, Francesco Cavalli's Xerse and Ercole amante, proved failures in Paris in 1660 and 1662, the prospects of opera flourishing in France looked remote. Yet Italian opera would stimulate the French to make their own experiments at the genre and, paradoxically, it would be an Italian-born composer, Lully, who would found a lasting French operatic tradition.

In 1669, Pierre Perrin founded the Académie d'Opéra and, in collaboration with the composer Robert Cambert, tried his hand at composing operatic works in French. Their first effort, Pomone, appeared on stage on 3 March 1671 and was followed a year later by Les peines et plaisirs de l'amour. At this point Louis XIV transferred the privilege of producing operas from Perrin to Jean-Baptiste Lully. Lully, a Florentine, was already the favourite musician of the king, who had assumed full royal powers in 1661 and was intent on refashioning French culture in his image. Lully had a sure instinct for knowing exactly what would satisfy the taste of his master and the French public in general. He had already composed music for extravagant court entertainments as well as for the theatre, most notably the comédies-ballets inserted into plays by Molière. Yet Molière and Lully had quarrelled bitterly and the composer found a new and more pliable collaborator in Philippe Quinault, who would write the libretti for all but two of Lully's operas.

On 27 April 1673, Lully's Cadmus et Hermione – often regarded as the first French opera in the full sense of the term – appeared in Paris. It was a work in a new genre, which its creators Lully and Quinault baptised tragédie en musique, a form of opera specially adapted for French taste. Lully went on to produce tragédies en musique at the rate of at least one a year until his death in 1687 and they formed the bedrock of the French national operatic tradition for almost a century. As the name suggests, tragédie en musique was modelled on the French Classical tragedy of Corneille and Racine. Lully and Quinault replaced the confusingly elaborate Baroque plots favoured by the Italians with a much clearer five-act structure. Each of the five acts generally followed a regular pattern. An aria in which one of the protagonists expresses their inner feelings is followed by recitative mixed with short arias (petits airs) which move the action forward. Acts end with a divertissement, the most striking feature of French Baroque opera, which allowed the composer to satisfy the public's love of dance, huge choruses and gorgeous visual spectacle. The recitative, too, was adapted and moulded to the unique rhythms of the French language and was often singled out for special praise by critics, a famous example occurring in Act Two of Lully's Armide. The five acts of the main opera were preceded by an allegorical prologue, another feature Lully took from the Italians, which he generally used to sing the praises of Louis XIV. Indeed, the entire opera was often thinly disguised flattery of the French monarch, who was represented by the noble heroes drawn from Classical myth or Mediaeval romance.

The tragédie en musique was a form in which all the arts, not just music, played a crucial role. Quinault's verse combined with the set designs of Carlo Vigarani or Jean Bérain and the choreography of Beauchamp and Olivet, as well as the elaborate stage effects known as the machinery. As one of its detractors, Melchior Grimm, was forced to admit: "To judge of it, it is not enough to see it on paper and read the score; one must have seen the picture on the stage".

== From Lully to Rameau: new genres ==
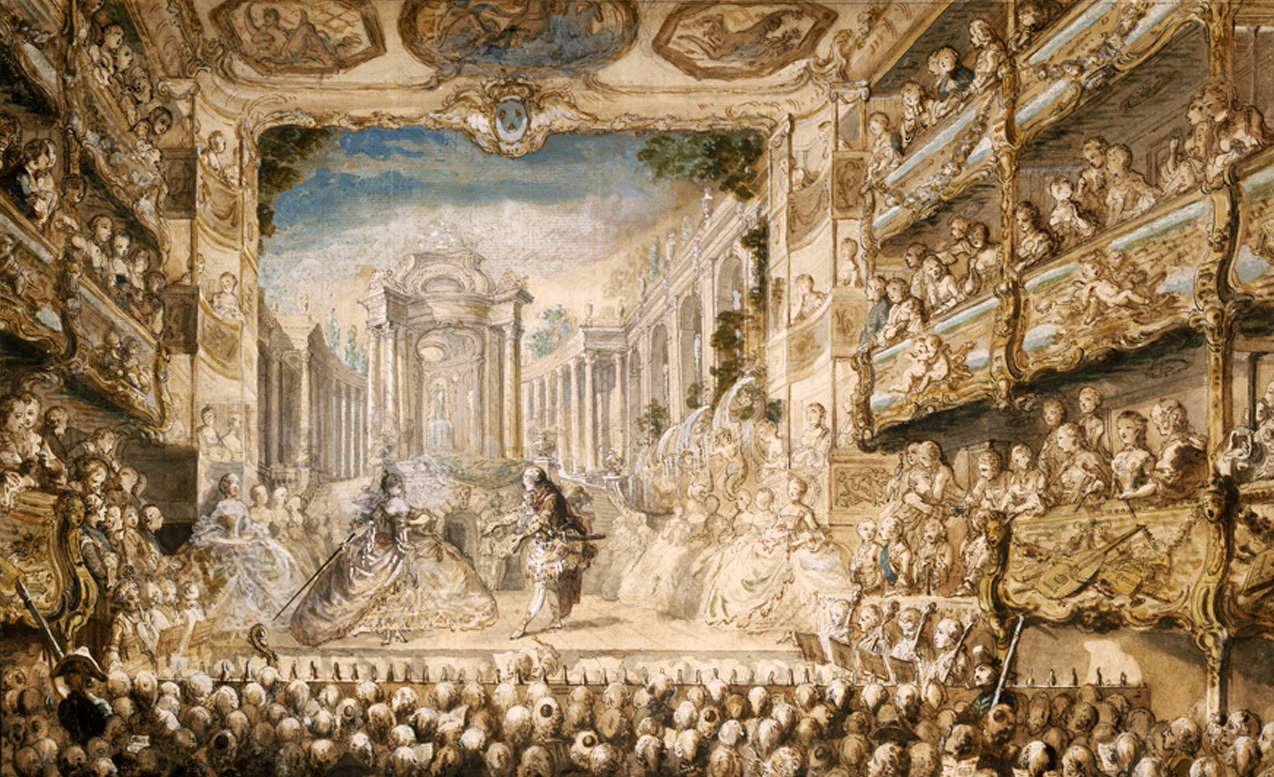
A performance of Lully's opera Armide at the Palais-Royal in 1761

French opera was now established as a distinct genre. Though influenced by Italian models, tragédie en musique increasingly diverged from the form then dominating Italy, opera seria. French audiences disliked the castrato singers who were extremely popular in the rest of Europe, preferring their male heroes to be sung by the haute-contre, a particularly high tenor voice. Dramatic recitative was at the heart of Lullian opera, whereas in Italy recitative had dwindled to a perfunctory form known as secco, where the voice was accompanied only by the continuo. Likewise, the choruses and dances that were such a feature of French works played little or no part in opera seria. Arguments over the respective merits of French and Italian music dominated criticism throughout the following century, until Gluck arrived in Paris and effectively fused the two traditions in a new synthesis.

Lully had not guaranteed his supremacy as the leading French opera composer through his musical talents alone. In fact, he had used his friendship with King Louis to secure a virtual monopoly on the public performance of stage music. It was only after Lully's death that other opera composers emerged from his shadow. The most noteworthy was probably Marc-Antoine Charpentier, whose sole tragédie en musique, Médée, appeared in Paris in 1693 to a decidedly mixed reception. Lully's supporters were dismayed at Charpentier's inclusion of Italian elements in his opera, particularly the rich and dissonant harmony the composer had learned from his teacher Giacomo Carissimi in Rome. Nevertheless, Médée has been acclaimed as "arguably the finest French opera of the 17th century". Other composers tried their hand at tragédie en musique in the years following Lully's death, including Marin Marais (Alcyone, 1703), André Cardinal Destouches (Télémaque, 1714) and André Campra (Tancrède, 1702; Idoménée, 1712).

Campra also invented a new, lighter genre: the opéra-ballet. As the name suggests, opéra-ballet contained even more dance music than the tragédie en musique. The subject matter was generally far less elevated too; the plots were not necessarily derived from Classical mythology and even allowed for the comic elements which Lully had excluded from the tragédie en musique after Thésée (1675). The opéra-ballet consisted of a prologue followed by a number of self-contained acts (also known as entrées), often loosely grouped round a single theme. The individual acts could also be performed independently, in which case they were known as actes de ballet. Campra's first work in the form, L'Europe galante ("Europe in Love") of 1697, is a good example of the genre. Each of its four acts is set in a different European country (France, Spain, Italy and Turkey) and features ordinary middle-class characters. Opéra-ballet continued to be a tremendously popular form for the rest of the Baroque period.

Another popular genre of the era was the pastorale héroïque, the first example of which was Lully's last completed opera Acis et Galatée (1686). The pastorale héroïque usually drew on Classical subject matter associated with pastoral poetry and was in three acts, rather than the five of the tragédie en musique. Around this time, some composers also experimented at writing the first French comic operas, a good example being Jean-Joseph Mouret's Les amours de Ragonde (1714).

== Rameau ==
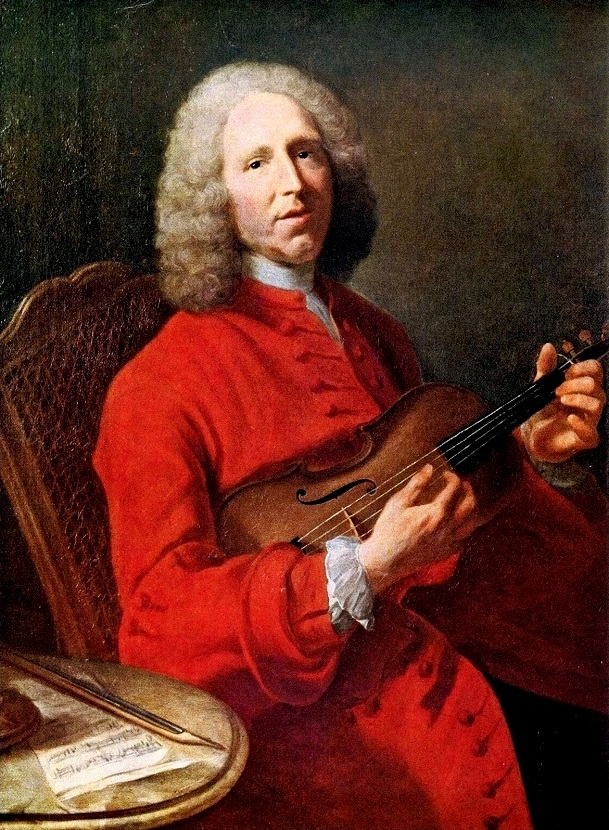
Jean-Philippe Rameau, the eighteenth-century innovator

Jean-Philippe Rameau was the most important opera composer to appear in France after Lully. He was also a highly controversial figure and his operas were subject to attacks by both the defenders of the French, Lullian tradition and the champions of Italian music. Rameau was almost fifty when he composed his first opera, Hippolyte et Aricie, in 1733. Until that point, his reputation had mainly rested on his works on music theory. The opera caused an immediate stir. Some members of the audience, like Campra, were struck by its incredible richness of invention. Others, led by the supporters of Lully, found Rameau's use of unusual harmonies and dissonance perplexing and reacted with horror. The war of words between the "Lullistes" and the "Ramistes" continued to rage for the rest of the decade. Rameau made little attempt to create new genres; instead he took existing forms and innovated from within using a musical language of great originality. He was a prolific composer, writing five tragédies en musique, six opéra-ballets, numerous pastorales héroïques and actes de ballets as well as two comic operas, and often revising his works several times until they bore little resemblance to their original versions.

By 1745, Rameau had won acceptance as the official court composer, but a new controversy broke out in the 1750s. This was the so-called Querelle des Bouffons, in which supporters of Italian opera, such as the philosopher and musician Jean-Jacques Rousseau, accused Rameau of being an old-fashioned, establishment figure. The "anti-nationalists" (as they were sometimes known) rejected Rameau's style, which they felt was too precious and too distanced from emotional expression, in favour of what they saw as the simplicity and "naturalness" of the Italian opera buffa, best represented by Giovanni Battista Pergolesi's La serva padrona. Their arguments would exert a great deal of influence over French opera in the second half of the eighteenth century, particularly over the emerging form known as opéra comique.

== The growth of opéra comique ==
Opéra comique began life in the early eighteenth century, not in the prestigious opera houses or aristocratic salons, but in the theatres of the annual Paris fairs. Here plays began to include musical numbers called vaudevilles, which were existing popular tunes refitted with new words. In 1715, the two fair theatres were brought under the aegis of an institution called the Théâtre de l'Opéra-Comique. In spite of fierce opposition from rival theatres, the venture flourished, and composers were gradually brought in to write original music for the plays, which became the French equivalent of the German Singspiel, because they contained a mixture of arias and spoken dialogue. The Querelle des Bouffons (1752–54), mentioned above, was a major turning-point for opéra comique. In 1752, the leading champion of Italian music, Jean-Jacques Rousseau, produced a short opera, Le Devin du village, in an attempt to introduce his ideals of musical simplicity and naturalness to France. Though Rousseau's piece had no spoken dialogue, it provided an ideal model for composers of opéra comique to follow. These included the Italian Egidio Duni (Le peintre amoureux de son modèle, 1757) and the French François-André Danican Philidor (Tom Jones, 1765) and Pierre-Alexandre Monsigny (Le déserteur, 1769). All these pieces dealt with ordinary bourgeois characters rather than Classical heroes.

But the most important and popular composer of opéra comique in the late eighteenth century was André Grétry. Grétry successfully blended Italian tunefulness with a careful setting of the French language. He was a versatile composer who expanded the range of opéra comique to cover a wide variety of subjects from the Oriental fairy tale Zémire et Azor (1772) to the musical satire of Le jugement de Midas (1778) and the domestic farce of L'amant jaloux (also 1778). His most famous work was the historical "rescue opera", Richard Coeur-de-lion (1784), which achieved international popularity, reaching London in 1786 and Boston in 1797.

== Gluck in Paris ==
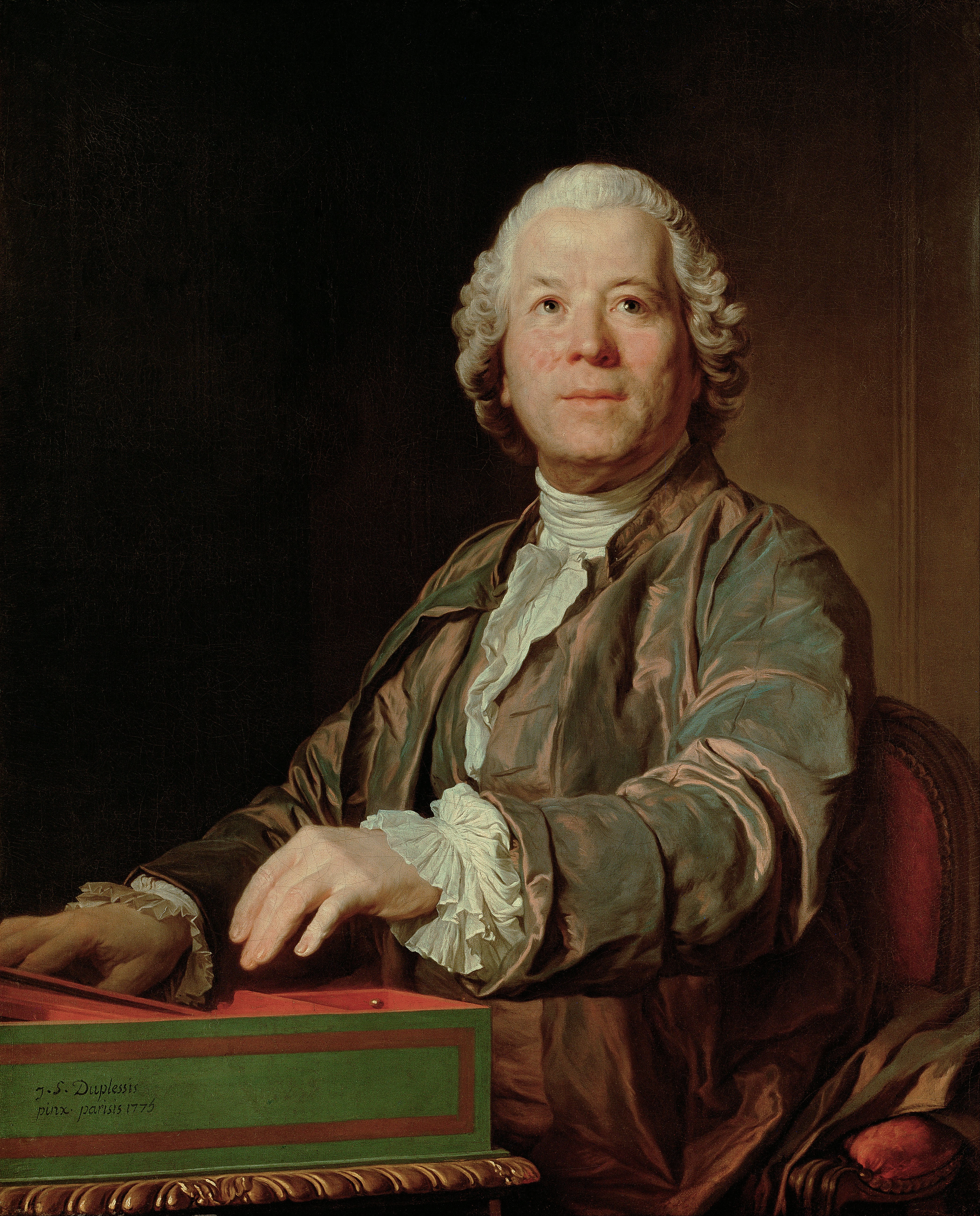
Portrait of Christoph Willibald Gluck by Joseph Duplessis, 1775

While opéra comique flourished in the 1760s, serious French opera was in the doldrums. Rameau had died in 1764, leaving his last great tragédie en musique, Les Boréades unperformed. No French composer seemed capable of assuming his mantle. The answer was to import a leading figure from abroad. The Bohemian-Austrian composer Christoph Willibald Gluck was already famous for his reforms of Italian opera, which had replaced the old opera seria with a much more dramatic and direct style of music theatre, beginning with Orfeo ed Euridice in 1762. Gluck admired French opera and had absorbed the lessons of both Rameau and Rousseau. In 1765, Melchior Grimm published "Poème lyrique", an influential article for the Encyclopédie on lyric and opera librettos. Under the patronage of his former music pupil, Marie Antoinette, who had married the future French king Louis XVI in 1770, Gluck signed a contract for six stage works with the management of the Paris Opéra. He began with Iphigénie en Aulide (19 April 1774). The premiere sparked a huge controversy, almost a war, such as had not been seen in the city since the Querelle des Bouffons. Gluck's opponents brought the leading Italian composer, Niccolò Piccinni, to Paris to demonstrate the superiority of Neapolitan opera and the "whole town" engaged in an argument between "Gluckists" and "Piccinnists".

On 2 August 1774, the French version of Orfeo ed Euridice was performed, with the title role transposed from the castrato to the haute-contre, according to the French preference for high tenor voices which had ruled since the days of Lully. This time Gluck's work was better received by the Parisian public. Gluck went on to write a revised French version of his Alceste, as well as the new works Armide (1777), Iphigénie en Tauride(1779) and Écho et Narcisse for Paris. After the failure of the last named opera, Gluck left Paris and retired from composing. But he left behind an immense influence on French music and several other foreign composers followed his example and came to Paris to write Gluckian operas, including Antonio Salieri (Les Danaïdes, 1784) and Antonio Sacchini (Œdipe à Colone, 1786).

== From the Revolution to Rossini ==
The French Revolution of 1789 was a cultural watershed. What was left of the old tradition of Lully and Rameau was finally swept away, to be rediscovered only in the twentieth century. The Gluckian school and opéra comique survived, but they immediately began to reflect the turbulent events around them. Established composers such as Grétry and Nicolas Dalayrac were drafted in to write patriotic propaganda pieces for the new regime. A typical example is François-Joseph Gossec's Le triomphe de la République (1793) which celebrated the crucial Battle of Valmy the previous year. A new generation of composers appeared, led by Étienne Méhul and the Italian-born Luigi Cherubini. They applied Gluck's principles to opéra comique, giving the genre a new dramatic seriousness and musical sophistication. The stormy passions of Méhul's operas of the 1790s, such as Stratonice and Ariodant, earned their composer the title of the first musical Romantic. Cherubini's works too held a mirror to the times. Lodoïska was a "rescue opera" set in Poland, in which the imprisoned heroine is freed and her oppressor overthrown. Cherubini's masterpiece, Médée (1797), reflected the bloodshed of the Revolution only too successfully: it was always more popular abroad than in France. The lighter Les deux journées of 1800 was part of a new mood of reconciliation in the country.

Theatres had proliferated during the 1790s, but when Napoleon took power, he simplified matters by effectively reducing the number of Parisian opera houses to three. These were the Opéra (for serious operas with recitative not dialogue); the Opéra-Comique (for works with spoken dialogue in French); and the Théâtre-Italien (for imported Italian operas). All three would play a leading role over the next half-century or so. At the Opéra, Gaspare Spontini upheld the serious Gluckian tradition with La vestale (1807) and Fernand Cortez (1809). Nevertheless, the lighter new opéra-comiques of Boieldieu and Nicolas Isouard were a bigger hit with French audiences, who also flocked to the Théâtre-Italien to see traditional opera buffa and works in the newly fashionable bel canto style, especially those by Rossini, whose fame was sweeping across Europe. Rossini's influence began to pervade French opéra comique. Its presence is felt in Boieldieu's greatest success, La dame blanche (1825) as well as later works by Daniel Auber (Fra Diavolo, 1830; Le domino noir, 1837), Ferdinand Hérold (Zampa, 1831) and Adolphe Adam (Le postillon de Lonjumeau, 1836). In 1823, the Théâtre-Italien scored an immense coup when it persuaded Rossini himself to come to Paris and take up the post of manager of the opera house. Rossini arrived to welcome worthy of a modern media celebrity. Not only did he revive the flagging fortunes of the Théâtre-Italien, but he also turned his attention to the Opéra, giving it French versions of his Italian operas and a new piece, Guillaume Tell (1829). This proved to be Rossini's final work for the stage. Disillusioned by the failure of this work and ground down the excessive workload of running a theatre, Rossini retired as an opera composer.

== Grand opera ==
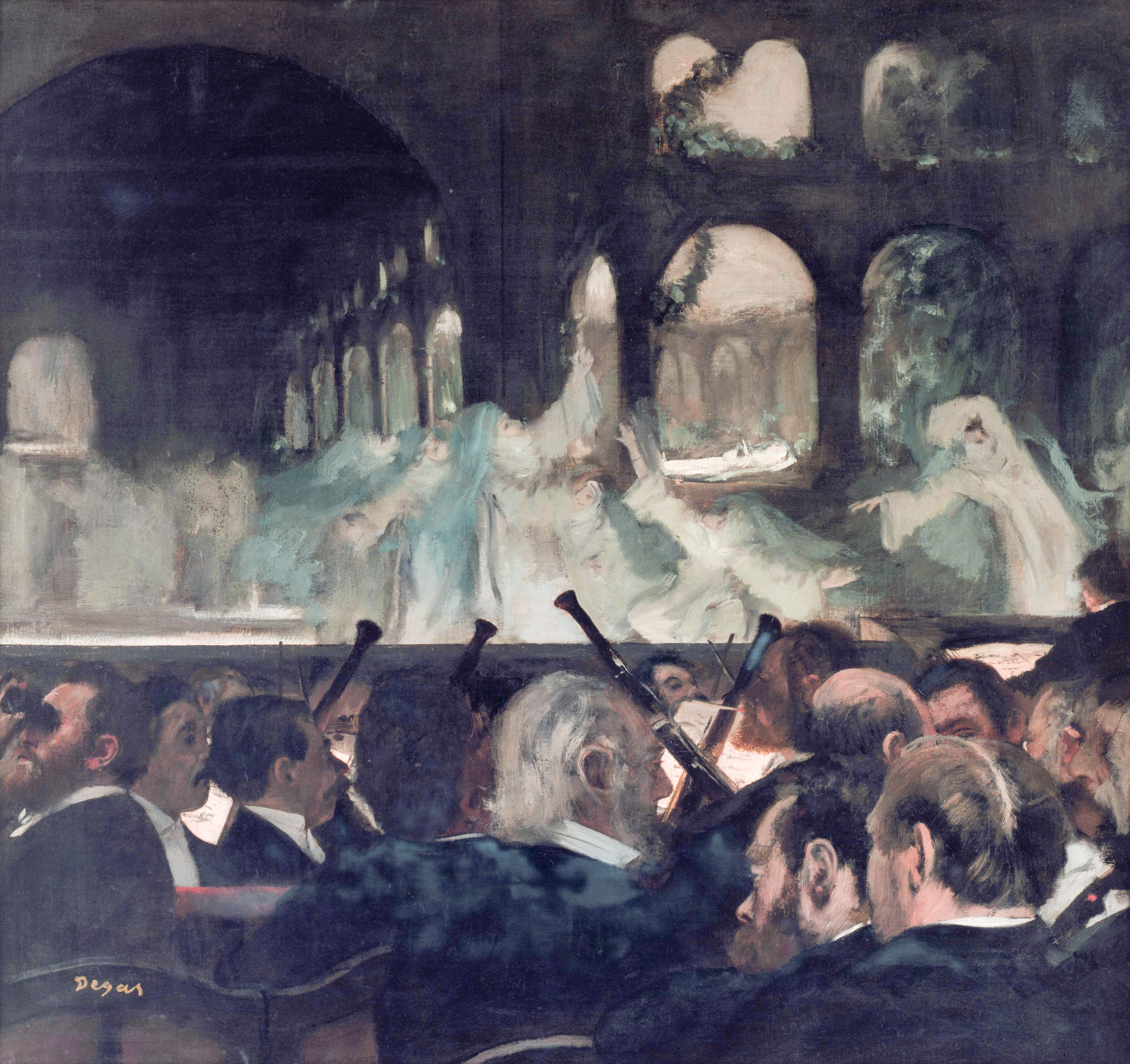
The ballet of the nuns from Meyerbeer's Robert le diable. Painting by Edgar Degas (1876)

Guillaume Tell might initially have been a failure but together with a work from the previous year, Auber's La muette de Portici, it ushered in a new genre which dominated the French stage for the rest of the century: grand opera. This was a style of opera characterised by grandiose scale, heroic and historical subjects, large casts, vast orchestras, richly detailed sets, sumptuous costumes, spectacular scenic effects and – this being France – a great deal of ballet music. Grand opera had already been prefigured by works such as Spontini's La vestale and Cherubini's Les Abencérages (1813), but the composer history has above all come to associate with the genre is Giacomo Meyerbeer. Like Gluck, Meyerbeer was a German who had learnt his trade composing Italian opera before arriving in Paris. His first work for the Opéra, Robert le diable (1831), was a sensation; audiences particularly thrilled to the ballet sequence in Act Three in which the ghosts of corrupted nuns rise from their graves. This work, together with Meyerbeer's three subsequent grand operas, Les Huguenots (1836), Le prophète (1849) and L'Africaine (1865), became part of the repertoire throughout Europe for the rest of the nineteenth century and exerted an immense influence on other composers, even though the musical merit of these extravagant works was often disputed. In fact, the most famous example of French grand opera likely to be encountered in opera houses today is by Giuseppe Verdi, who wrote Don Carlos for the Paris Opéra in 1867.

== Berlioz ==
While Meyerbeer's popularity has faded, the fortunes of another French composer of the era have risen steeply over the past few decades. Yet the operas of Hector Berlioz were failures in their day. Berlioz was a unique mixture of an innovative modernist and a backward-looking conservative. His taste in opera had been formed in the 1820s, when the works of Gluck and his followers were being pushed aside in favour of Rossinian bel canto. Though Berlioz grudgingly admired some works by Rossini, he despised what he saw as the showy effects of the Italian style and longed to return opera to the dramatic truth of Gluck. He was also a fully-fledged Romantic, keen to find new ways of musical expression. His first and only work for the Paris Opéra, Benvenuto Cellini (1838), was a notorious failure. Audiences could not understand the opera's originality and musicians found its unconventional rhythms impossible to play.

Twenty years later, Berlioz began writing his operatic masterpiece Les Troyens with himself rather than audiences of the day in mind. Les Troyens was to be the culmination of the French Classical tradition of Gluck and Spontini. Predictably, it failed to make the stage, at least in its complete, four-hour form. For that, it would have to wait until the second half of the twentieth century, fulfilling the composer's prophecy, "If only I could live till I am a hundred and forty, my life would become decidedly interesting". Berlioz's third and final opera, the Shakespearean comedy Béatrice et Bénédict (1862), was written for a theatre in Germany, where audiences were far more appreciative of his musical innovation.

== The late 19th century ==
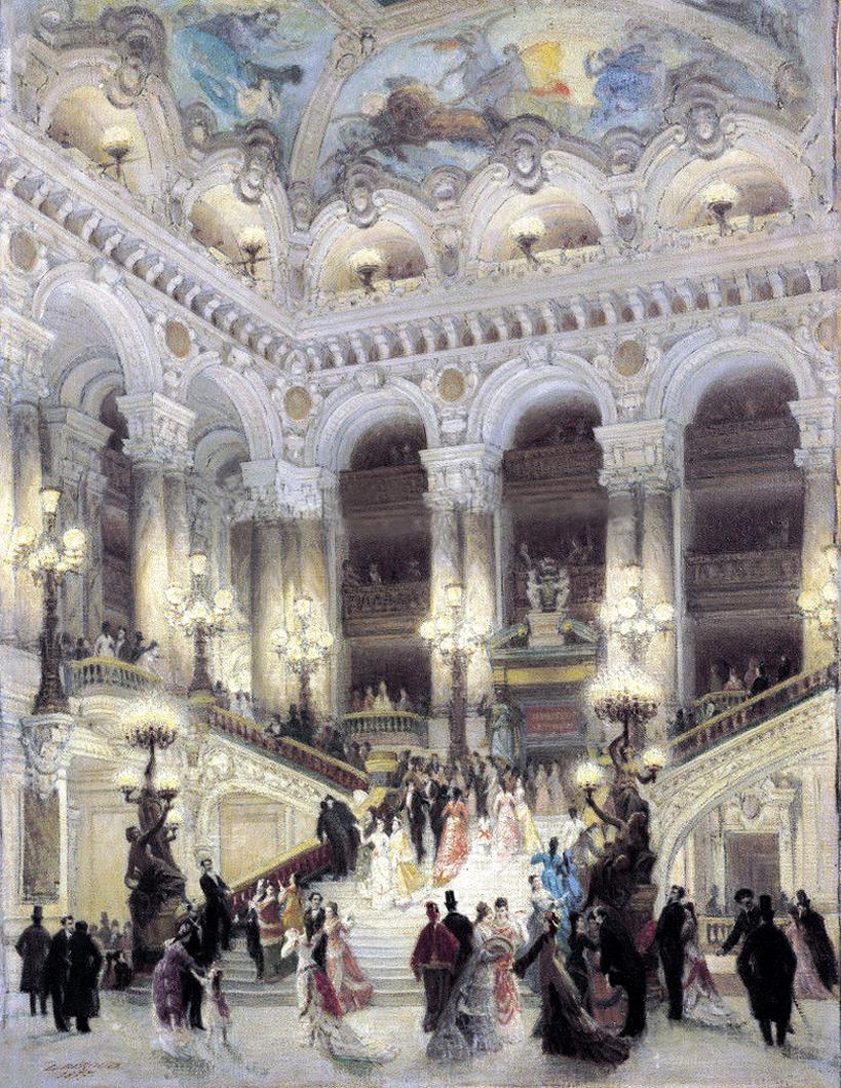
The foyer of Charles Garnier's Opéra, Paris, opened 1875

Berlioz was not the only one discontented with operatic life in Paris. In the 1850s, two new theatres attempted to break the monopoly of the Opéra and the Opéra-Comique on the performance of musical drama in the capital. The Théâtre Lyrique ran from 1851 to 1870. It was here in 1863 that Berlioz saw the only part of Les Troyens to be performed in his lifetime.

But the Lyrique also staged the premieres of works by a rising new generation of French opera composers, led by Charles Gounod and Georges Bizet. Though not as innovative as Berlioz, these composers were receptive to new musical influences. They also liked writing operas on literary themes. Gounod's Faust (1859), based on the drama by Goethe, became an enormous worldwide success. Gounod followed it with Mireille (1864), based on the Provençal epic by Frédéric Mistral, and the Shakespeare-inspired Roméo et Juliette (1867). Bizet offered the Théâtre Lyrique Les pêcheurs de perles (1863) and La jolie fille de Perth, but his biggest triumph was written for the Opéra-Comique. Carmen (1875) is now perhaps the most famous of all French operas. Early critics and audiences, however, were shocked by its unconventional blend of romantic passion and realism.

Another figure unhappy with the Parisian operatic scene in the mid-nineteenth century was Jacques Offenbach. He found that contemporary French opéra-comiques no longer offered any room for comedy. His Théâtre des Bouffes-Parisiens, established in 1855, put on short one-act pieces full of farce and satire. In 1858, Offenbach tried something more ambitious. Orphée aux enfers ("Orpheus in the Underworld") was the first work in a new genre: operetta. It was both a parody of highflown Classical tragedy and a satire on contemporary society. Its incredible popularity prompted Offenbach to follow up with more operettas such as La belle Hélène (1864) and La Vie parisienne (1866) as well as the opera Les contes d'Hoffmann (1881).

Opera flourished in late nineteenth-century Paris and many works of the period went on to gain international renown. These include Mignon (1866) and Hamlet (1868) by Ambroise Thomas; Samson et Dalila (1877, in the Opéra's new home, the Palais Garnier) by Camille Saint-Saëns; Lakmé (1883) by Léo Delibes; and Le roi d'Ys (1888) by Édouard Lalo. The most consistently successful composer of the era was Jules Massenet, who produced twenty-five operas in his characteristically suave and elegant style, including several for the Théâtre de la Monnaie in Brussels and the Opéra de Monte-Carlo. His tragic romances Manon (1884) and Werther (1892) have weathered changes in musical fashion and are still widely performed today.

== French Wagnerism and Debussy ==
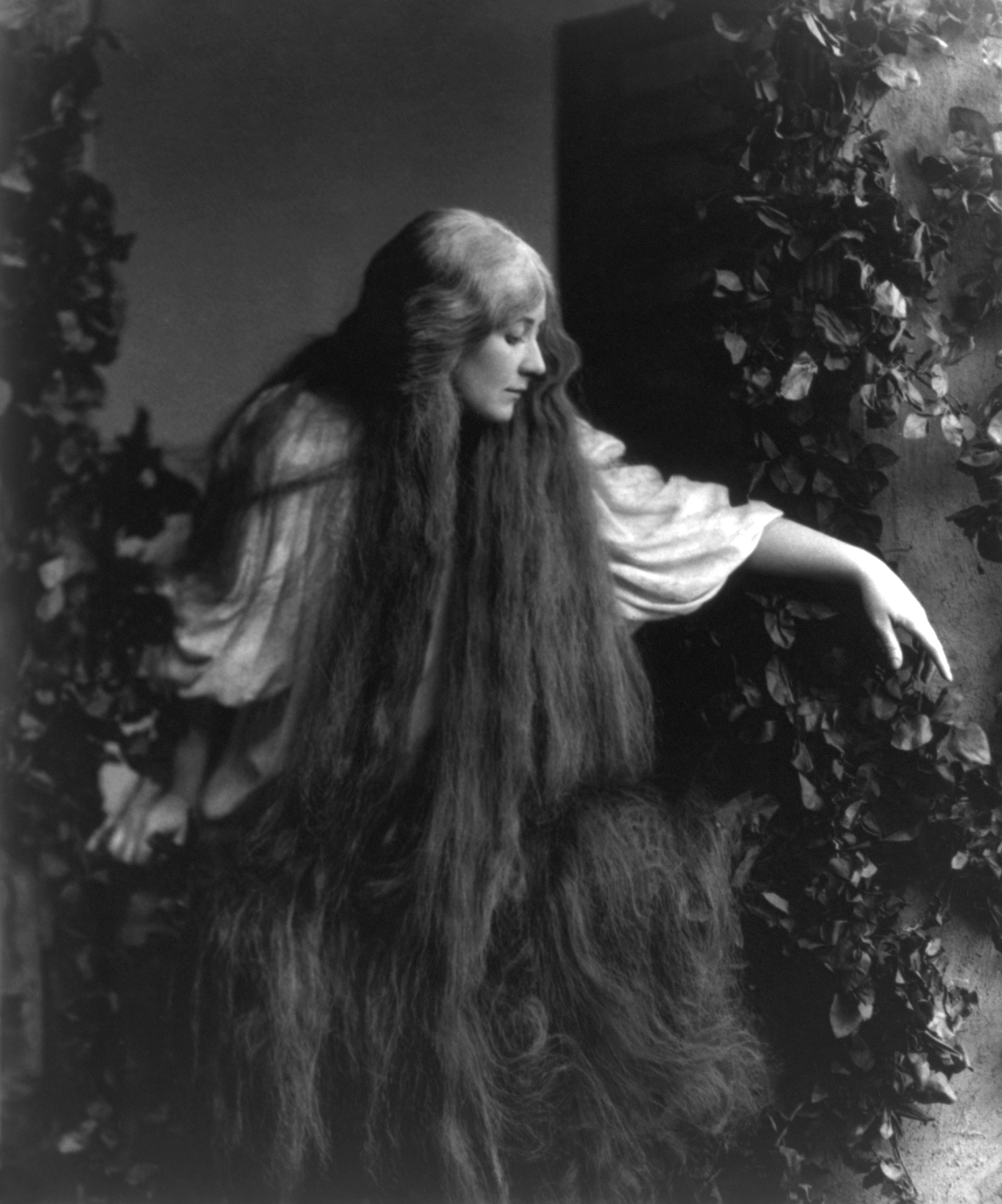
Mary Garden, the interpreter of the premiere, in a representation of Pelléas et Mélisande in 1908

The conservative music critics who had rejected Berlioz detected a new threat in the form of Richard Wagner, the German composer whose revolutionary music dramas were causing controversy throughout Europe. When Wagner presented a revised version of his opera Tannhäuser in Paris in 1861, it provoked so much hostility that the run was cancelled after only three performances. Deteriorating relations between France and Germany only made matters worse and after the Franco-Prussian War of 1870–71, there were political and nationalistic reasons to reject Wagner's influence too. Traditionalist critics used the word "Wagnerian" as a term of abuse for anything that was modern in music. Yet composers such as Gounod and Bizet had already begun to introduce Wagnerian harmonic innovations into their scores, and many forward-thinking artists such as the poet Charles Baudelaire praised Wagner's "music of the future". Some French composers began to adopt the Wagnerian aesthetic wholesale. These included César Franck (Hulda, 1885), Emmanuel Chabrier (Gwendoline, 1886), Vincent d'Indy (Fervaal, 1895) and Ernest Chausson (Le roi Arthus, 1903). Few of these works have survived; they were too derivative to preserve much individuality of their own composers.

Claude Debussy had a much more ambivalent – and ultimately more fruitful – attitude to Wagner. Initially overwhelmed by his experience of Wagner's operas, especially Parsifal, Debussy later tried to break free of his influence. Debussy's only completed opera Pelléas et Mélisande (1902) shows the influence of the German composer in the central role given to the orchestra and the complete abolition of the traditional difference between aria and recitative. Indeed, Debussy had complained that there was "too much singing" in conventional opera and replaced it with fluid, vocal declamation moulded to the rhythms of the French language. Debussy made the love story of Pelléas et Mélisande an elusive Symbolist drama in which the characters only express their feelings indirectly. The mysterious atmosphere of the opera is enhanced by orchestration of remarkable subtlety and suggestive power.

== The twentieth century and beyond ==
The Opéra Bastille in Paris, which opened in 1989. Located in the 12th arrondissement, it faces the Place de la Bastille.

The early years of the twentieth century saw two more French operas which, though not on the level of Debussy's achievement, managed to absorb Wagnerian influences while retaining a sense of individuality. These were Gabriel Fauré's austerely Classical Pénélope (1913) and Paul Dukas's colourful Symbolist drama, Ariane et Barbe-Bleue (1907). The more frivolous genres of operetta and opéra comique still thrived in the hands of composers like André Messager and Reynaldo Hahn. Indeed, for many people, light and elegant works like this represented the true French tradition as opposed to the "Teutonic heaviness" of Wagner. This was the opinion of Maurice Ravel, who wrote only two short but ingenious operas: L'heure espagnole (1911), a farce set in Spain; and L'enfant et les sortilèges (1925), a fantasy set in the world of childhood in which various animals and pieces of furniture come to life and sing.

A younger group of composers, who formed a group known as Les Six shared a similar aesthetic to Ravel. The most important members of Les Six were Darius Milhaud, Arthur Honegger and Francis Poulenc. Milhaud was a prolific and versatile composer who wrote in a variety of forms and styles, from the Opéras-minutes (1927–28), none of which is more than ten minutes long, to the epic Christophe Colomb (1928). The Swiss-born Honegger experimented mixing opera with oratorio in works such as Le Roi David (1921) and Jeanne d'Arc au bûcher (1938). But the most successful opera composer of the group was Poulenc, though he came late to the genre with the surrealist comedy Les mamelles de Tirésias in 1947. In complete contrast, Poulenc's greatest opera, Dialogues des Carmélites (1957) is an anguished spiritual drama about the fate of a convent during the French Revolution. Poulenc wrote some of the very few operas since the Second World War to win a wide international audience.

Another post-war composer to attract attention outside France was Olivier Messiaen, like Poulenc a devout Catholic. Messiaen's religious drama Saint François d'Assise (1983) requires huge orchestral and choral forces and lasts four hours. St. François in turn was one of the inspirations for Kaija Saariaho's L'Amour de loin (2000). Denisov's L'écume des jours (1981) is an adaptation of the novel by Boris Vian. Philippe Boesmans' Julie (2005, after August Strindberg's Miss Julie) was commissioned by the Théâtre de la Monnaie of Brussels, an important center for French opera even in Lully's day.

== See also ==
Category:French-language operas
