= 1690 in music =

The year 1690 in music involved some significant events.

== Events ==
- Invention of the clarinet (approximate)
- Georg Muffat becomes Kapellmeister to the Bishop of Passau.

== Published popular music ==
- "Captain Johnson's Last Farewell"

== Classical music ==
- Giovanni Battista Bassani – Armonici entusiasmi di Davide, Op. 9 (Venice)
- Giovanni Bononcini
  - Chi d'Amor tra le catene
  - La Maddalena a'piedi di Cristo
- Jacques Boyvin – Livre d'orgue I, Ton 1–8
- Nicolaus Bruhns – Mein Hertz ist Bereit
- Dietrich Buxtehude
  - Du Lebensfürst Herr Jesu Christ, BuxWV 22
  - Jubilate Domino, BuxWV 64
  - Quemadmodum desiderat cervus, BuxWV 92
  - Missa brevis, BuxWV 114
- Marc-Antoine Charpentier
  - Messe pour Mr Mauroy, H.6
  - Tenebrae Responsories H.127–133
  - Leçon de ténèbres du Mercredi saint, H.135, 138
  - Leçon de ténèbres du Jeudi saint, H.136, 139
  - Leçon de ténèbres du Vendredi saint, H.137, 140
  - In honorem Sancti Xaverij canticum, H.355
  - In nativitatem Domini canticum, H.416
  - Symphonie à 3 flûtes, H.529
  - Commencement d’ouverture, H.546
- François Couperin – La Steinquerque
- Gilles Jullien – Premier Livre d'Orgue
- Johann Kehnau – Bone Jesu, care Jesu
- Georg Muffat – Apparatus Musico-Organisticus
- Giovanni Domenico Partenio – Motets for two and three voices, Op. 1 (Venice: Giuseppe Sala)
- Francesco Passarini – Misse brevi for eight voices and organ continuo, Op. 4 (Bologna: Pier Maria Monti)
- Henry Purcell
  - music for The Tempest
  - music for Amphitryon, Z.572
- Giuseppe Torelli
  - Trumpet Sonata in D major, G.1
  - Sinfonia in D major, G.2
- Jean Veillot – Motets

== Opera ==
- Giuseppe Boniventi – Il gran Macedone
- Marc-Antoine Charpentier – Le Jugement de Paris
- Louis Lully – Orphée
- Henry Purcell – Dioclesian, Z.627
- Alessandro Scarlatti
  - La Rosaura
  - La Statira

== Theoretical writings ==
- Kurze doch deutliche Anleitung zu der lieblich- und löblichen Singekunst by Johann Georg Ahle, an enlarged and revised version of Johann Rudolf Ahle's famous singing manual, Brevis et perspicua introductio. A second edition was published in 1704.
- Traité d’accompagnement pour le théorbe et le clavecin by Denis Delair

== Births ==
- February 1 – Francesco Maria Veracini, violinist and composer (died 1768)
- June 11 – Giovanni Antonio Giay, composer (died 1764)
- September 15 – Ignazio Prota, composer and music teacher (died 1748)
- November 22 – François Colin de Blamont, composer (died 1760)
- November 24 (baptized) – Charles Theodore Pachelbel, organist, harpsichordist and composer (died 1750)
- date unknown
  - Francesco Barsanti, composer, recorder & oboe virtuoso; born Lucca, Toscany (IT). (Died 1775)
  - Johann Tobias Krebs, organist and composer (died 1762)
- probable
  - Giuseppe Antonio Brescianello, composer and violinist (died 1758)
  - Senesino, castrato singer (died 1756)

== Deaths ==
- May 27 – Giovanni Legrenzi, composer (born 1626)
- July 10 – Domenico Gabrielli, cellist and composer (born c.1651)
- date unknown – Gustaf Düben, organist (born 1628)
