= Jean-Baptiste Lully fils =

French musician (1665-1743)

Jean-Baptiste Lully fils (Paris, 6 August 1665 – 9 March 1743) was a French musician and the second son of the composer Jean-Baptiste Lully. He was also known as Baptiste Lully, Lully fils, and Monsieur Baptiste. He was born and died in Paris.

In 1678 at the age of 12, he was given a post by the king, Louis XIV, at the abbey of Saint-Hilaire. Six years later, he exchanged it for a post at Saint-Georges-sur-Loire.

In 1696 he became surintendant de la musique du roi (Superintendent of the Music of the King), a position he shared with Michel-Richard de Lalande until 1719.

With his brother Louis he composed Orphée (a lyric tragedy, 1690) that was badly received when it was performed, although historians of music today find it important for the prominence given in it to the accompanied recitative (La Gorce 2001). On his own, he also composed Le Triomphe des brunes (a divertissement, 1695).
