= Michel Duboullay =

French librettist

Michel Duboullay or Du Boullay (1676 in Paris – 1751 in Rome) was a French librettist.

Secretary of the Grand Prieur de Vendôme, Duboullay authored the librettos of two operas:

- Zéphyre et Flore, opera-ballet in three acts and a prologue, music by Louis Lully and Jean-Louis Lully, played 22 March 1688 and revived in theatre by the Académie royale de musique Tuesday 18 June 1715 (Paris, P. Ribou)
- Orphée, three-act tragedy, music by Louis Lully, presented in 1690.

== Sources ==
- Jacques Bernard Durey de Noinville, Louis Travenol, Histoire du Théâtre de l’opéra en France depuis l’établissement de l’Académie, Paris, Joseph Barbou, 1753, (p. 191).
