= Jean-Louis Lully =

French musician and composer (1667-1688)

Jean-Louis Lully (24 September 1667 – 23 December 1688) was a French musician and composer. He was born in Paris, the youngest son of Jean-Baptiste Lully.

On 8 June 1687 he succeeded his father as surintendant and compositeur de la musique de la chambre du roi and he was nominated for another of his father's posts, Director of the Opera. Because he was only 20 years old, however, the decision was postponed and was never ratified before he died the following year. His skill as a composer is unknown, in part because most of the works bearing his name were collaborations, written with Pierre Vignon. These included the lyric tragedy Zéphire et Flore (1688) libretto by Michel Duboullay, to which his older brother Louis also contributed, and an Idylle performed at Anet. He died in Paris (La Gorce 2001).
