= Pomone (opera) =

1671 Opera by Robert Cambert

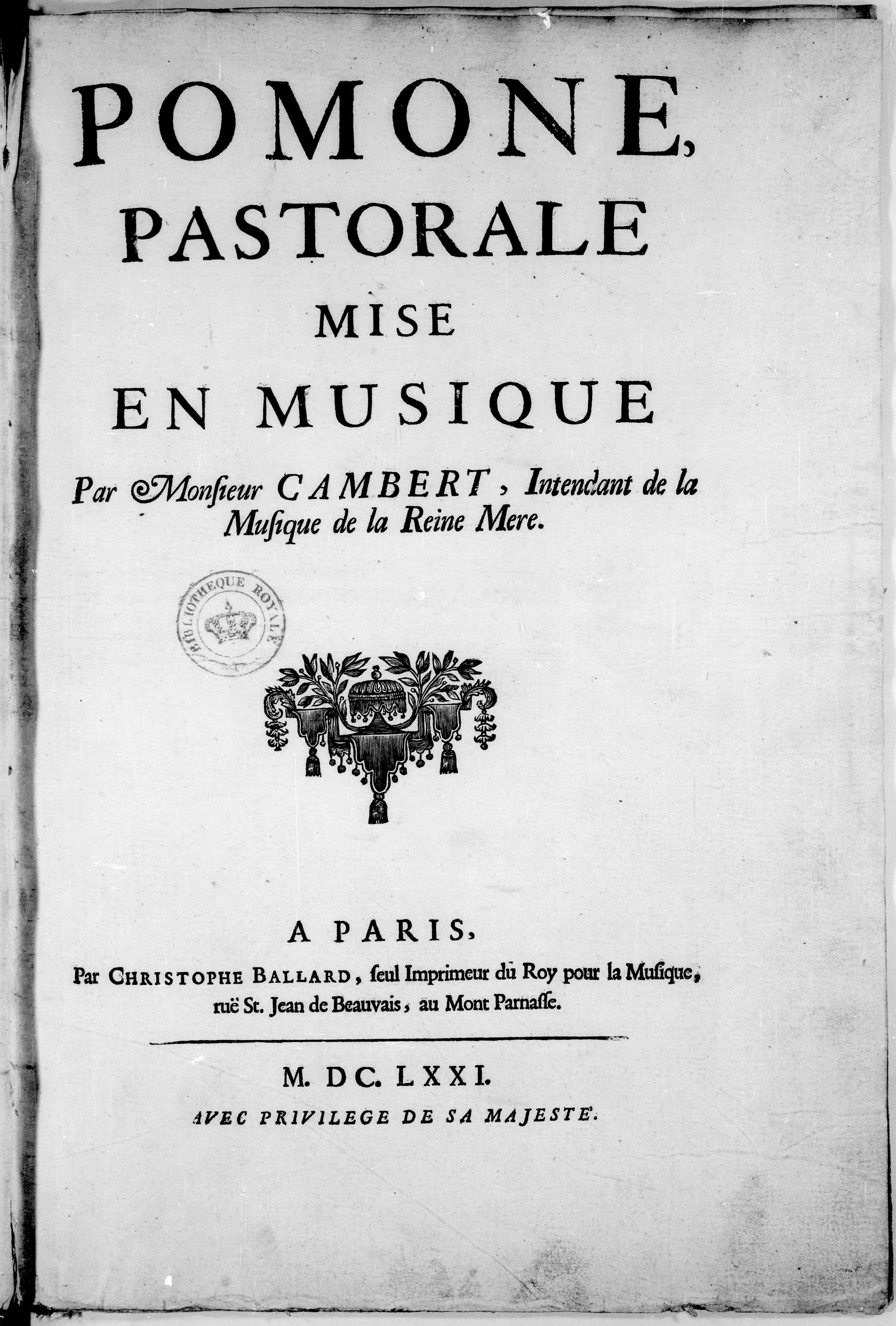
Title page of the partial score of Pomone, published by Ballard in 1671

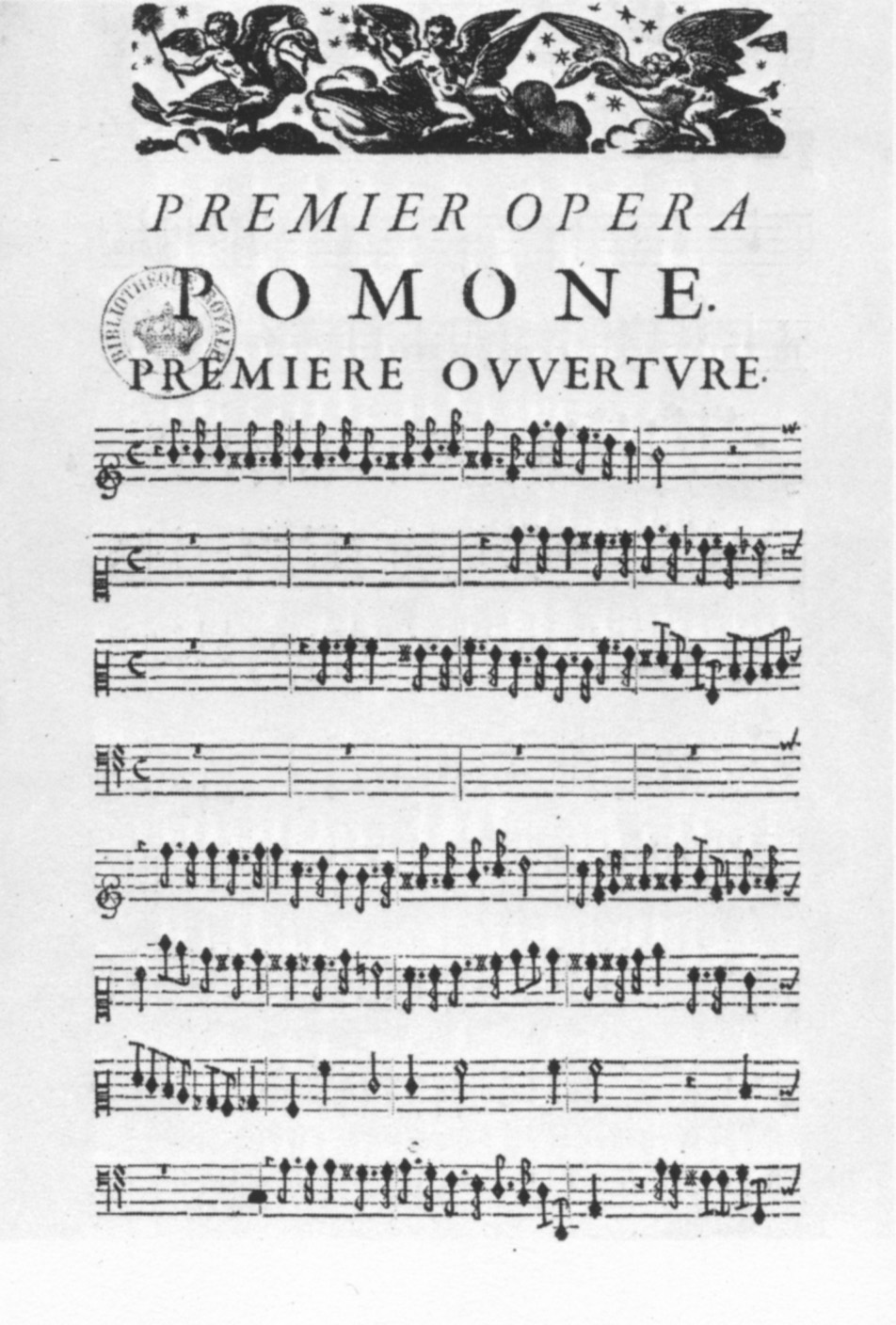
First page of the score

Pomone (Pomona) is a pastoral opera in a prologue and five acts by Robert Cambert with a libretto by Pierre Perrin. It has been described as "effectively the first French opera." It was first performed in Paris at the Jeu de Paume de la Bouteille theatre belonging to Cambert and Perrin's Académie d'Opéra on 3 March 1671. The production had ballets choreographed by Des Brosses and sets and machinery designed by Alexandre de Rieux, marquis de Sourdéac. The novelty of the work drew large audiences and the opera enjoyed 146 performances over the eight months of its run. The score of Pomone has only partially survived.

== Background and performance history ==
Attempts had been made to introduce Italian opera to France in the mid-17th century but French audiences had disliked the genre, preferring their own form of stage music drama, the ballet de cour, a ballet containing sung elements. Nevertheless, some French composers began to experiment with developing opera which would better suit national tastes. On 28 June 1669, King Louis XIV had granted Perrin and his Académie d'Opéra the monopoly on performing operas on the Parisian stage. Pomone was the first production by the Académie. It contained many of the features audience were used to in the ballet de cour: dance, spectacular stage effects and rich costumes. The innovations were the replacement of spoken dialogue by recitative and the use of more complicated vocal ensembles. The pastoral theme of the work was not new, for instance Cambert had already composed music for a stage work called the Pastorale d'Issy in 1659. In spite of Pomone's success, Perrin soon ran into financial difficulties. The Académie staged another opera with music by Cambert, Les peines et les plaisirs de l'Amour, in early 1672, but the king then revoked Perrin's monopoly on opera production and transferred it to his favourite composer, Jean-Baptiste Lully, who would have more success in establishing a lasting French operatic tradition. Cambert moved to London with his pupil Louis Grabu, where he staged a version of Pomone with additional music by Grabu.

== Roles ==
Role	Voice type	Premiere cast, 3 March 1671
Pomone (Pomona), goddess of fruits	soprano	Marie-Madeleine Jossier, called "Cartilly"
Flore (Flora), goddess of flowers, Pomone's sister	soprano	
Vertumne (Vertumnus), god of Lares, in love with Pomone	basse-taille (baritone)	François Beaumavielle
Faune (Faunus), god of villagers, in love with Pomone	basse-taille	Pierre Rossignol
Dieu des Jardins (God of gardens), in love with Pomone		
Juturne, a nymph of Pomone		
Venilie, a nymph of Pomone		
Beroé, Pomone's nurse		

== Synopsis ==
Vertumne is in love with Pomone and Pomone's nurse Beroé is in love with Vertumne. Vertumne assumes various disguises in his attempts to seduce Pomone: a dragon, Pluto, Bacchus. He only succeeds when he disguises himself as Beroé, because Pomone cannot refuse her old nurse a kiss.

== Recording ==
The surviving 30 minutes of music was recorded by Hugo Reyne, conducting La Simphonie du Marais, on a 2-disc CD set also containing Jean-Baptiste Lully's Les fêtes de l'Amour et de Bacchus (Accord, 2004)
