= Pierre Perrin =

French poet and librettist (c. 1620–1675)

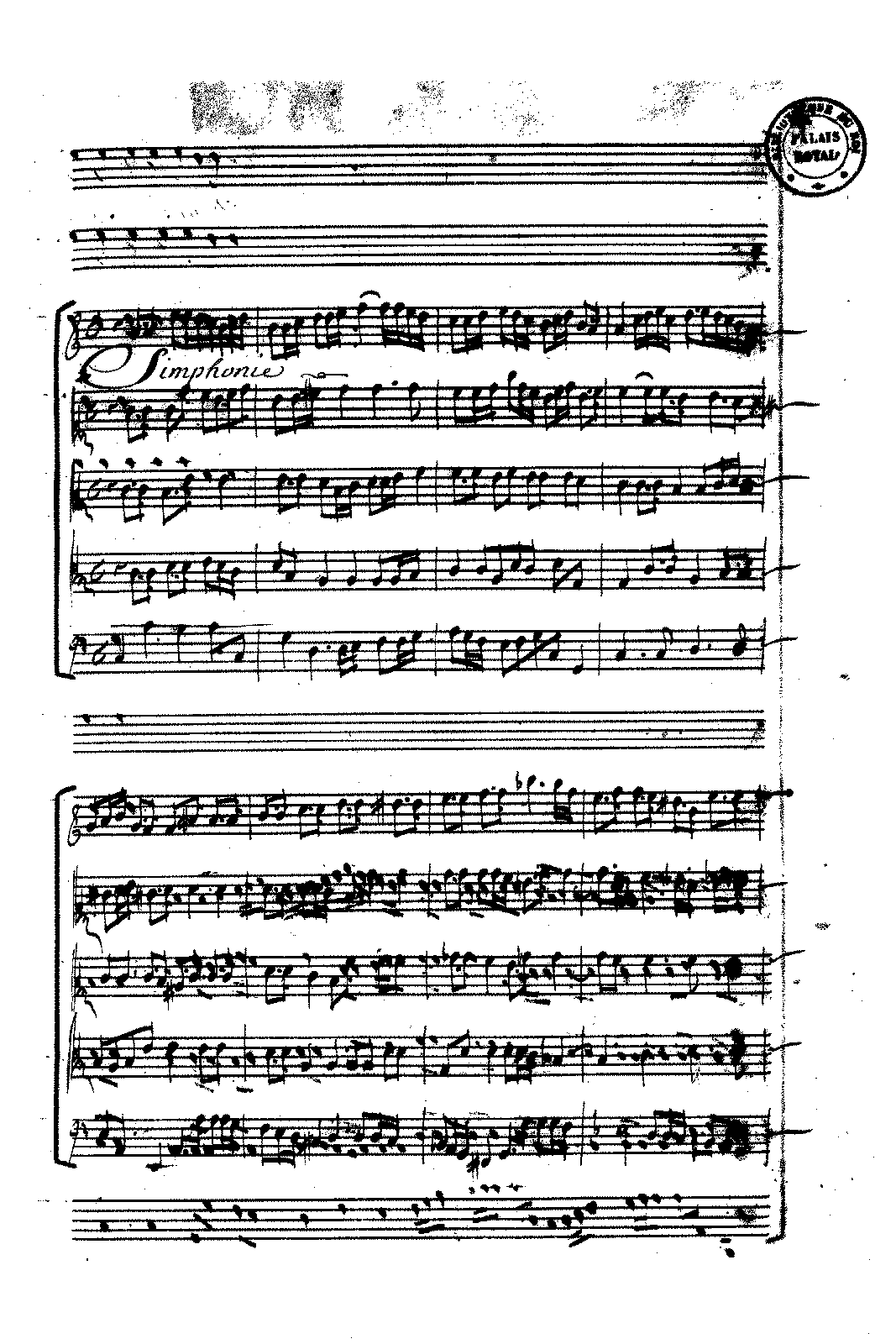
Motet Plaude Laetare Gallia, Perrin wrote a text and Lully music. (Lully's manuscript)

Pierre Perrin (c. 1620 – 24 April 1675; also Abbé Perrin) was a French poet and librettist. He wrote the libretto for the first French opera, Pomone (1671), alongside composer Robert Cambert. In 1669, he founded and become the first director for what would later become the Paris Opera.

== Life and career ==
Pierre Perrin was born in Lyon around 1620. He founded the Académie d'Opéra, which later was renamed the Académie Royale de Musique when control of it passed to Jean-Baptiste Lully.

He worked with Robert Cambert, creating with him La Pastorale d'Issy in 1659, and with Jean-Baptiste Boësset, creating La Mort d'Adonis, in 1662. With Cambert, he also created Pomone, which inaugurated the opening of the first "salle de l'Opéra" in 1671, of which he had obtained the privilege from King Louis XIV. He also presented there his Les peines et les plasirs de l'amour.

A poor administrator and the victim of dishonest collaborators, Perrin was imprisoned for debts and had to sell his privilege to Lully in 1672. After prison, Perrin became a culturally "forgotten figure", and died in Paris on 24 April 1675.

Perrin is sometimes known as L'Abbé Perrin or simply Abbé Perrin although he never belonged to the clergy.

His verses were long-considered considered mediocre, with criticism appearing as early as the writings of Charles de Saint-Évremond (1613–1703). A reevaluation has been encouraged by Louis E. Auld in his three-part monograph series on Perrin (1986).

== See also ==
- Plaude Laetare Gallia

Cultural offices
Preceded by Position established	Director of the Paris Opera; 1669–1672	Succeeded by Jean-Baptiste Lully
