= Plaude Laetare Gallia =

Motet by Jean-Baptiste Lully and Pierre Perrin

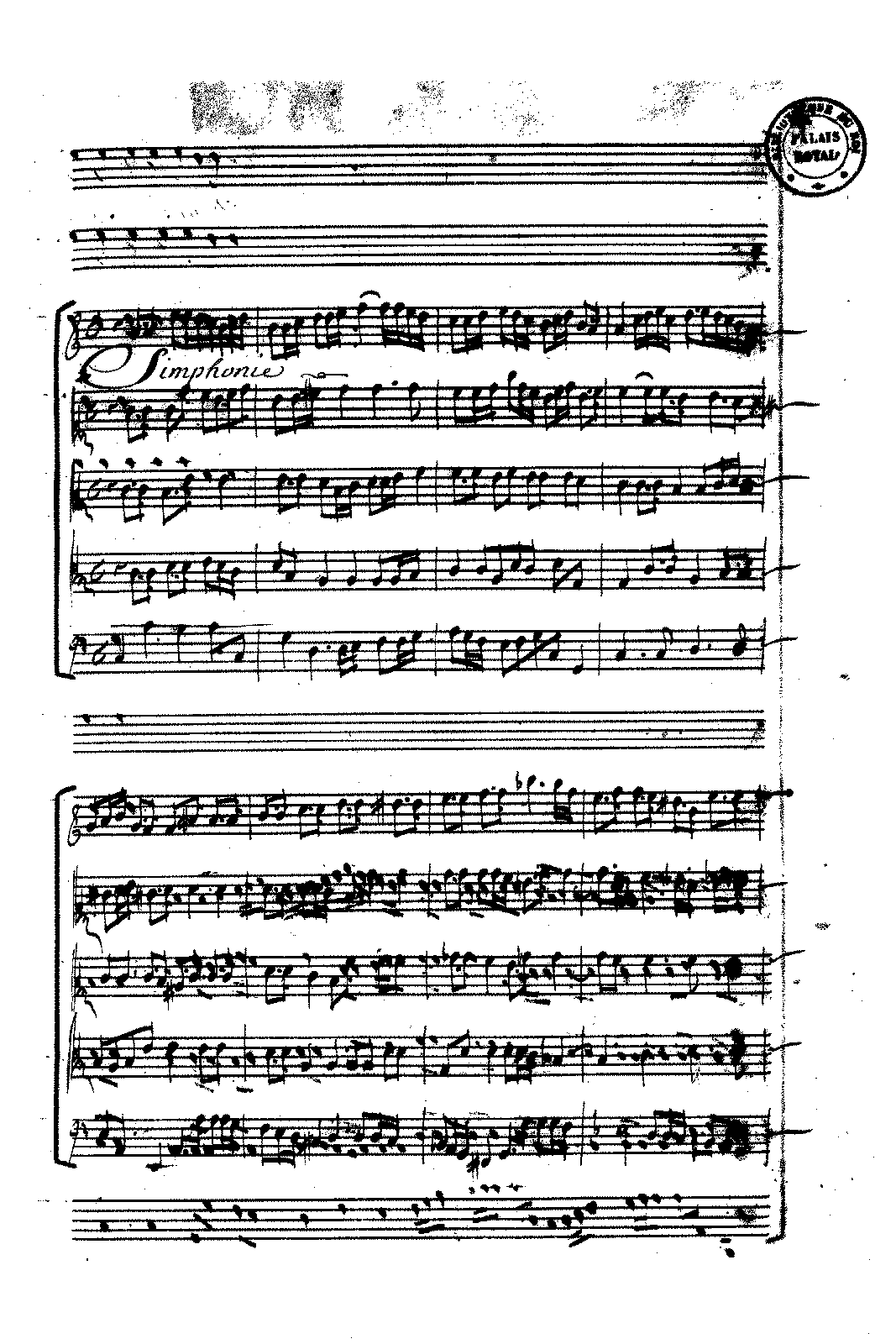
Lully's manuscript "Plaude Laetare Gallia"

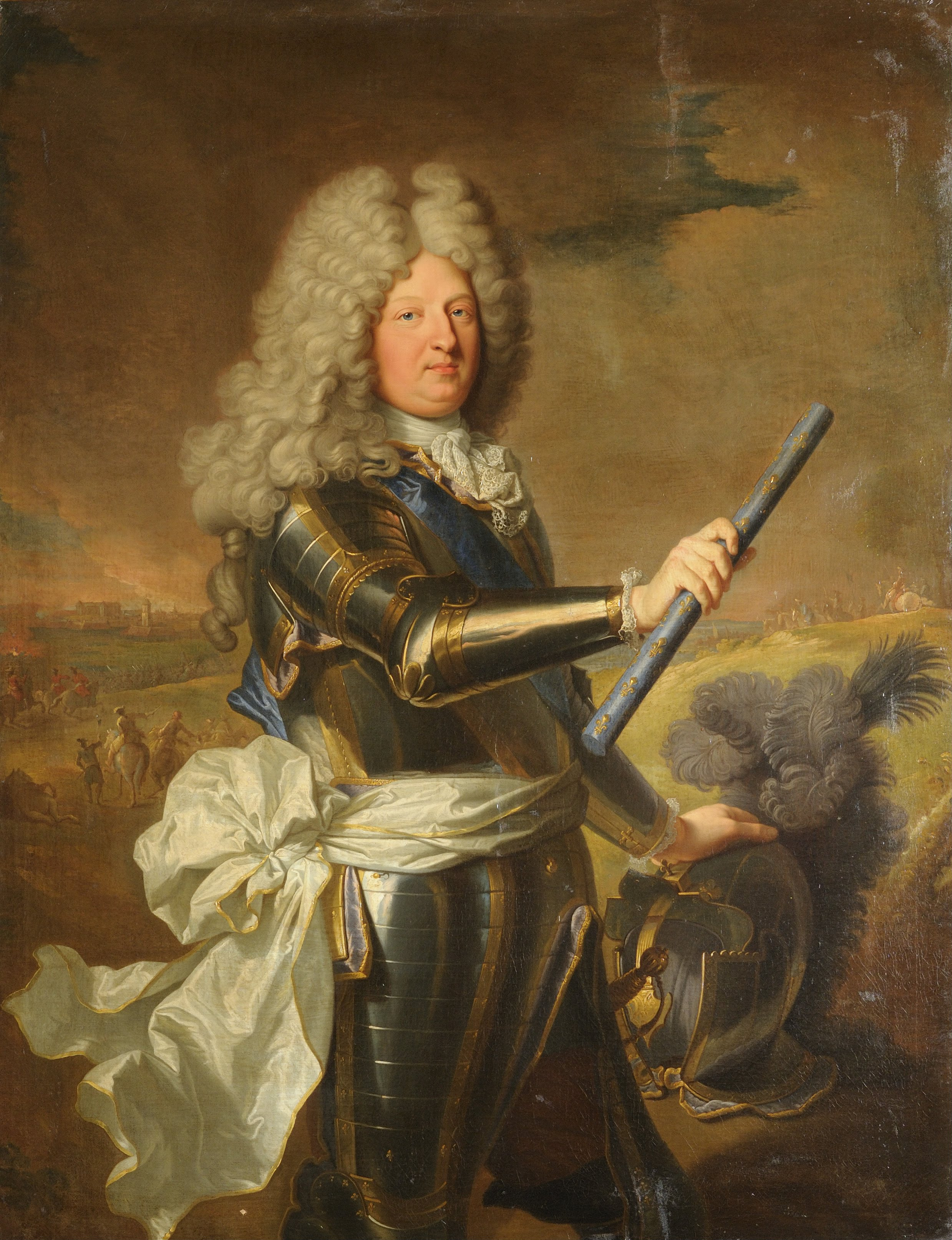
The Grand Dauphin Louis, son of Louis XIV. (The Sun King)

Plaude laetare Gallia is a motet by Jean-Baptiste Lully (music) and Pierre Perrin (text), written to celebrate the baptism of King Louis XIV's son, the Grand Dauphin Louis, on 24 March 1668 (when he was 7 years old), at the chapel of the Château de Saint-Germain-en-Laye.

== Parts of Plaude laetare Gallia ==
Plaude laetare Gallia contains three parts:

1. Symphonie
2. O Jesu vita precantium
3. Vivat regnet princeps fidelis

== Text ==
Latin: 1. Symphonie; Plaude laetare Gallia Rore caelesti rigantur lilia, Sacro Delphinus fonte lavatur Et christianus Christo dicatur.: 2. O Jesu vita precantium; O Jesu vita precantium O Jesu vita credentium Exaudi vota precantium: 3. Vivat regnet princeps fidelis; Vivat regnet princeps fidelis Semper justus, semper victor, semper augustus Triumphet in caelis Et sempiterna luceat corona.	English: 1. Symphonie; Rejoice and sing, France: the lily is bathed with heavenly dew. The Dauphin is bathed in the sacred font and the Christian is dedicated to Christ.: 2. O Jesu vita precantium; O Jesu, life to those who pray, O Jesu, life to those who believe, Hear the prayer of thy supplicants.: 3. Vivat regnet princeps fidelis; Long may the loyal Prince live and reign, Ever just, ever victorious, ever royal, May he triumph in heaven And may his crown shine for ever.

== See also ==
- List of compositions by Jean-Baptiste Lully
- Jean-Baptiste Lully
- Louis, Grand Dauphin
- Motet
