= Robert Cambert =

French composer (c. 1628–1677)

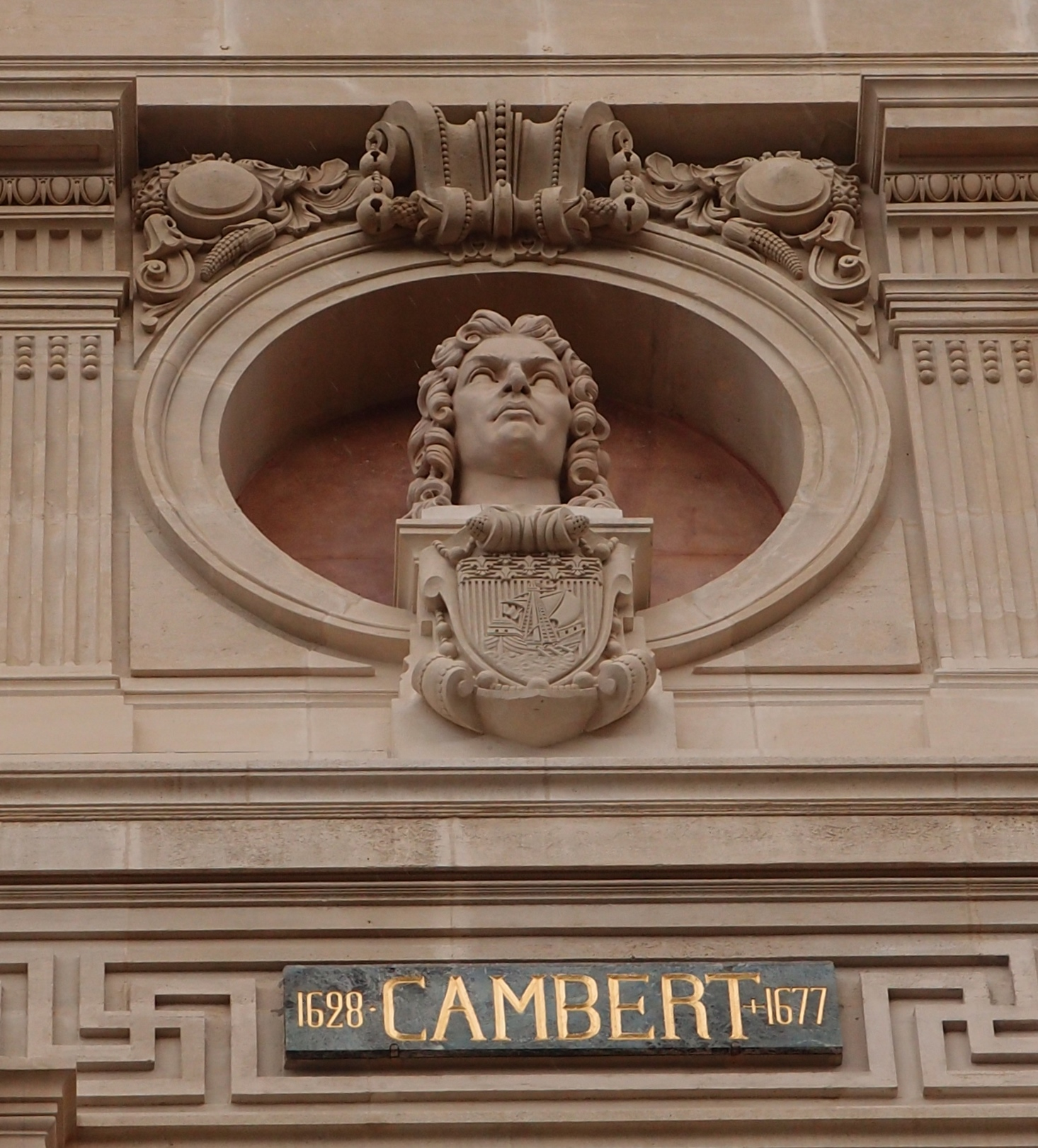

Robert Cambert (c. 1628–1677) was a French composer principally of opera. His opera Pomone was the first actual opera in French.

== Biography ==
=== Under Mazarin ===
Born in Paris c. 1628, he studied music under Chambonnières. His first position was as organist at the church of Saint-Honoré in Paris. In 1655 he married Marie du Moustier. At this time he came under the patronage of Cardinal Mazarin who was instrumental in his appointment as Superintendent of music to the Dowager Queen Anne of Austria, mother of Louis XIV. Cambert's early works with libretto written by Pierre Perrin were frequently performed at court during this period. However, following the death of the powerful Mazarin, and the Queen's subsequent retirement to a convent, Cambert's position at court was weakened, as new powers came into force at court.

=== Académie Royale de Musique ===
In 1669 Perrin founded the Académie Royale de Musique, under the auspices of the French King. Cambert was invited to join Perrin in the administration of the project which is considered today to be one of the founding influences of grand opera. However, both Perrin and Cambert were eventually replaced at the academy by Lully. Cambert, furious at the insult, and at the lack of interest in his work shown by the French monarchy, left France in 1673 to pursue his career in England.

=== English years ===
In England he was warmly received at the court of King Charles II, and was quickly appointed to "Master of the King's Band". Various pieces by him which had been shunned in France were now performed in London, but while accepted at the English court, he enjoyed little success with the general English public. His operas Pomone, Ariane and Les Peines et les plaisirs de l'amour were if anything less to the Anglo-Saxon taste than the French.

Cambert died, rather mysteriously, in London. His death was widely reported at the time to be suicide; another widespread theory is that he was poisoned by one of his servants. Some have accused Lully of complicity in Cambert's demise.

== Depictions in fiction ==
Gérard Corbiau's 2000 film Le Roi danse (The King is dancing) portrays a much older-looking Cambert (Johan Leysen) as the archrival of Lully and a symbol of Mazarin's old court Catholic establishment. Disgusted by libertine and pagan Lully, he desperately tries to prevent his rise and their animosity comes to a novel dimension after Cambert's mistress Madeleine Lambert, the daughter of Michel Lambert, marries Lully.
