= Orphée (Louis Lully) =

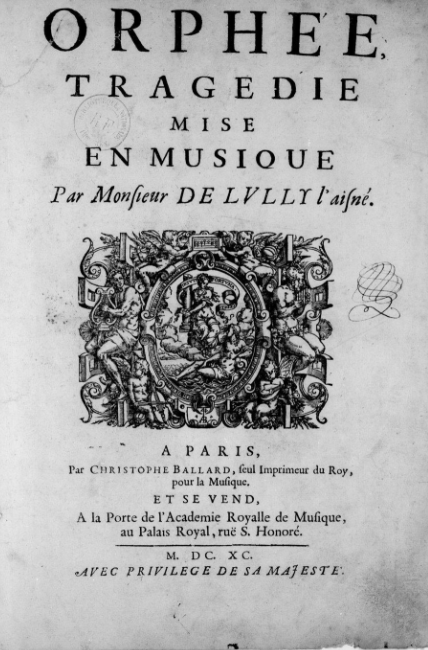
The title page of the opera

Orphée [ɔrfeə] (transl. Orpheus) is an opera by the French composer Louis Lully, with contributions from his brother Jean-Baptiste Lully the Younger. It was first performed at the Académie Royale de Musique (the Paris Opera) on 21 February 1690. It takes the form of a tragédie en musique in three acts and a prologue. The libretto is by Michel Duboullay. This opera was created as a satirical response to the tragicomedy and ballet Ballet de Psyche written by Louis Lully's father, which proclaimed the greatness of King Louis XIV's power and the calm that occurred because of his reign. Louis Lully chose the story of Orpheus in relation to the monarch as a commentary on the villainous tendencies of his rule of France.

== Prologue ==
The audience sees an empty theatre with the back Portico showing the raging of a cold winter's night. Venus, the goddess of Love and mother of Orpheus, comes in front of the audience and shows her disapproval for 'useless pomp' and the horrors of War, referencing the Nine Years' War, which as of 1690, has now entered its third year. She laments her son, Orpheus, although the state of her son is unclear from the description provided. The 'Games and Pleasures' (unclear what is being referenced by the description) make their appearance on stage, as well as Cupid and Charites (The Graces).
