= Louis Lully =

French musician (1664–1734)

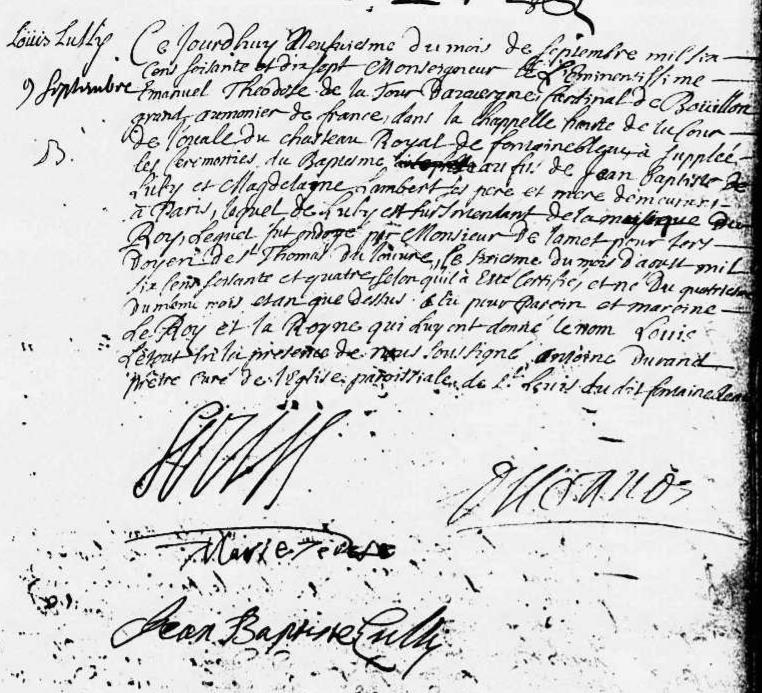
Document of baptism of Louis (signed by Louis XIV., Marie-Thérèse d'Autriche and by Jean-Baptiste Lully)

Louis Lully (4 August 1664 in Paris – 1 April 1734) was a French musician and the eldest son of Jean-Baptiste Lully.

== Life and career ==
Louis Lully was the second child (after Catherine-Madeleine Lully) and eldest son of Jean-Baptiste Lully and his wife Madeleine Lambert. He married Marthe Bourgeois on 27 December 1694, in St. Martial de Paris, "with the tacit and verbal consent of Madeleine Lambert, his mother, to whom a summons had been made". Five children were born of this marriage, in the parish of Saint-Paul in Paris, between 1695 and 1705, including a son, Louis-André Lully, who married Suzanne-Catherine Cartaud, aged 17, daughter of architect Jean-Silvain Cartaud, in St. Germain l'Auxerrois. The son survived Louis Lully by only a little over a year, dying in Paris on 21 July 1735.

Nearly disinherited by his father following dissolute behaviour and imprisonment, Louis did not have the brilliant career anticipated for him, not only because of his behaviour but also due to his lack of talent. What success he had as an opera composer was mostly down to works written in collaboration with others. For example, he collaborated with his brother Jean-Louis and Pierre Vignon on Zéphire et Flore (ballet, 1688), and with Marin Marais on Alcide (tragédie lyrique, 1693). The one work he composed on his own, Orphée (tragédie lyrique, 1690), was badly received when it was performed, though historians find it important for the prominence given in it to accompanied recitative.
