= Jean-Baptiste Lully =

Italian-French composer (1632–1687)

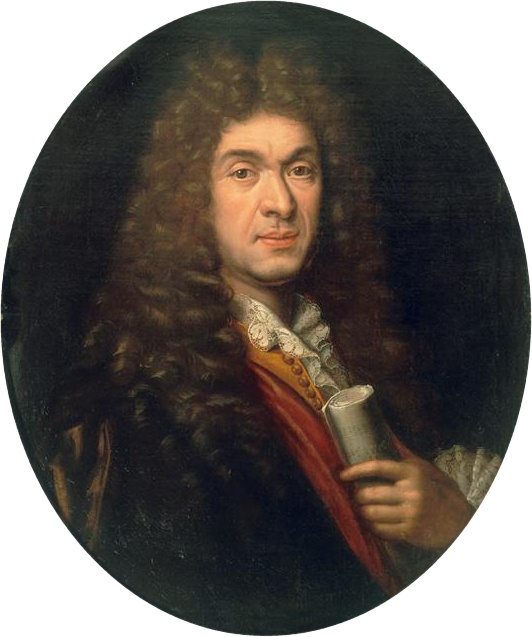
- Portrait between 1650 and 1691
- Born: Giovanni Battista Lulli; 28 or 29 November 1632; Florence, Grand Duchy of Tuscany
- Died: 22 March 1687 (aged 54); Paris, Kingdom of France
- Occupations: Composer; dancer; instrumentalist
- Works: List of compositions
- Children: Louis, Jean-Baptiste, and Jean-Louis

Jean-Baptiste Lully (Note: Pronunciation: English: UK: /ˈlʊli/ LUUL-ee, US: /luːˈliː/ loo-LEE; French: [ʒɑ̃ batist lyli].) (born Giovanni Battista Lulli; (Note: Italian pronunciation: [dʒoˈvanni batˈtista ˈlulli].) 28 or 29 November [O.S. 18 or 19 November] 1632 – 22 March 1687) was an Italian-French composer, dancer and instrumentalist, who is considered a master of the French Baroque music style. Best known for his operas, he spent most of his life working in the court of Louis XIV and became a French subject in 1661. He was a close friend of the playwright Molière, with whom he collaborated on numerous comédie-ballets, including L'Amour médecin, George Dandin ou le Mari confondu, Monsieur de Pourceaugnac, Psyché and his best known work, Le Bourgeois gentilhomme.

== Biography ==
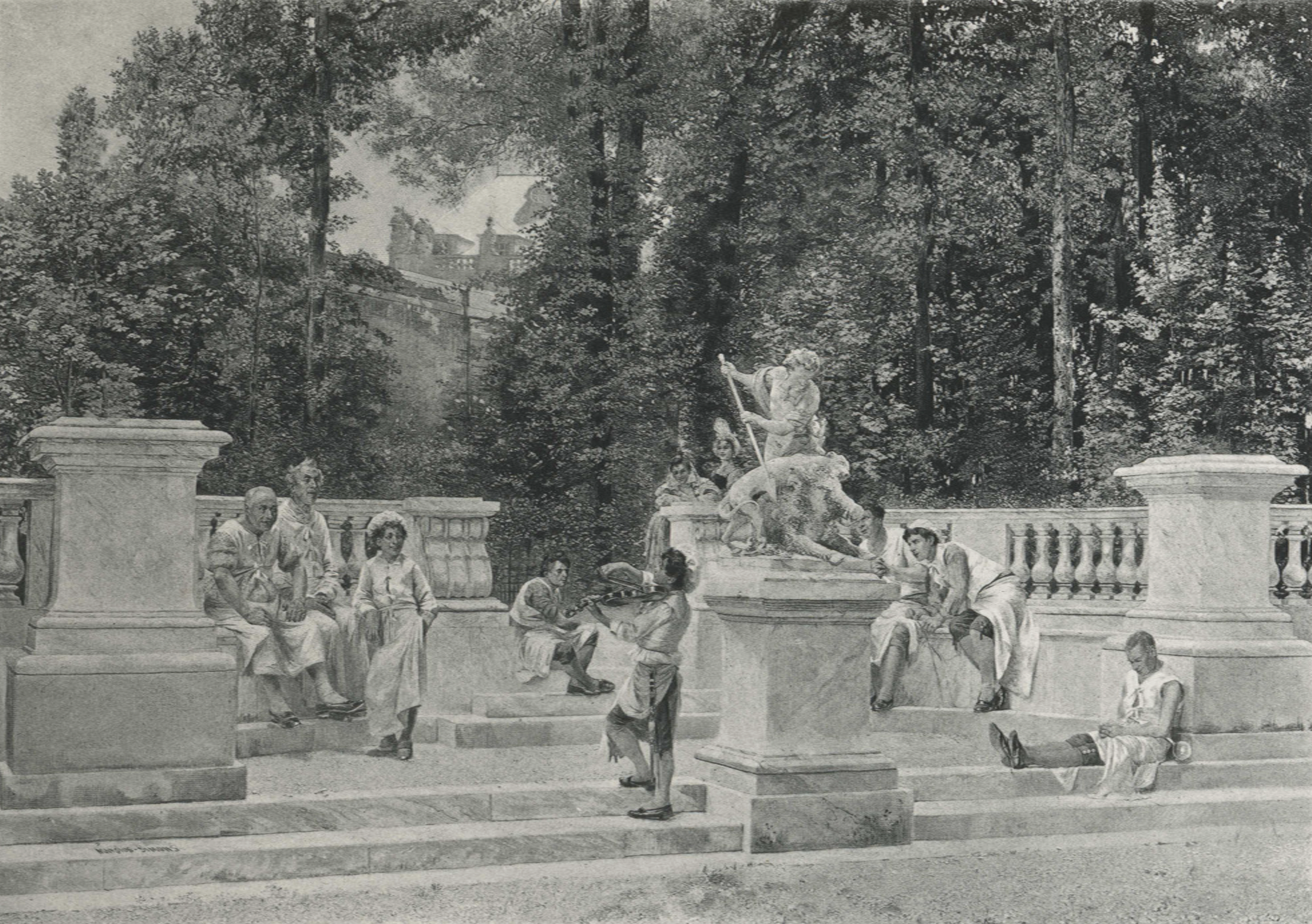
Pinckney Marcius-Simons, The Young Lulli, c.1888

Lully was born on 28 or 29 November 1632, in Florence, Grand Duchy of Tuscany, to Lorenzo Lulli and Caterina Del Sera, a Tuscan family of millers. His general education and his musical training during his youth in Florence remain uncertain, but his adult handwriting suggests that he manipulated a quill pen with ease. He used to say that a Franciscan friar gave him his first music lessons and taught him guitar. He also learned to play the violin. In 1646, dressed as Harlequin during Mardi Gras and amusing bystanders with his clowning and his violin, the boy attracted the attention of Roger de Lorraine, chevalier de Guise, son of Charles, Duke of Guise, who was returning to France and was looking for someone to converse in Italian with his niece, Mademoiselle de Montpensier (la Grande Mademoiselle). Guise took the boy to Paris, where the fourteen-year-old entered Mademoiselle's service; from 1647 to 1652, he served as her "chamber boy" (garçon de chambre). He probably honed his musical skills by working with Mademoiselle's household musicians and with composers Nicolas Métru, François Roberday and Nicolas Gigault. The teenager's talents as a guitarist, violinist, and dancer quickly won him the nicknames "Baptiste", and "le grand baladin" (great street-artist).

When Mademoiselle was exiled to the provinces in 1652, after the rebellion known as the Fronde, Lully "begged his leave ... because he did not want to live in the country." The princess granted his request.

By February 1653, Lully had attracted the attention of young Louis XIV, dancing with him in the Ballet royal de la nuit. By 16 March 1653, Lully had been made royal composer for instrumental music. His vocal and instrumental music for court ballets gradually made him indispensable. In 1660 and 1662, he collaborated on court performances of Francesco Cavalli's Xerse and Ercole amante. When Louis XIV took over the reins of government in 1661, he named Lully superintendent of the royal music and music master of the royal family. In December 1661, the Florentine was granted letters of naturalization. Thus, when he married Madeleine Lambert (1643–1720), the daughter of the renowned singer and composer Michel Lambert in 1662, Giovanni Battista Lulli declared himself to be "Jean-Baptiste Lully, escuyer [squire], son of Laurent de Lully, gentilhomme Florentin [Florentine gentleman]". The latter assertion of high birth was untrue. The couple had six children who survived past childhood: Catherine-Madeleine, Louis, Jean-Baptiste, Gabrielle-Hilarie, Jean-Louis and Louis-Marie.

From 1661 on, the trios and dances he wrote for the court were promptly published. As early as 1653, Louis XIV made him director of his personal violin orchestra, known as the Petits Violons ("Little Violins"), which was proving to be open to Lully's innovations, as contrasted with the Twenty-Four Violins or Grands Violons ("Great Violins"), who only slowly were abandoning the polyphony and divisions of past decades. When he became surintendant de la musique de la chambre du roi in 1661, the Great Violins also came under Lully's control. He relied mainly on the Little Violins for court ballets.

Lully's collaboration with the playwright Molière began with Les Fâcheux in 1661, when Lully provided a single sung courante, added after the work's premiere at Nicolas Fouquet's sumptuous chateau of Vaux-le-Vicomte. Their collaboration began in earnest in 1664 with Le Mariage forcé. More collaborations followed, some of them conceived for fetes at the royal court, and others taking the form of incidental music (intermèdes) for plays performed at command performances at court and also in Molière's Parisian theater.

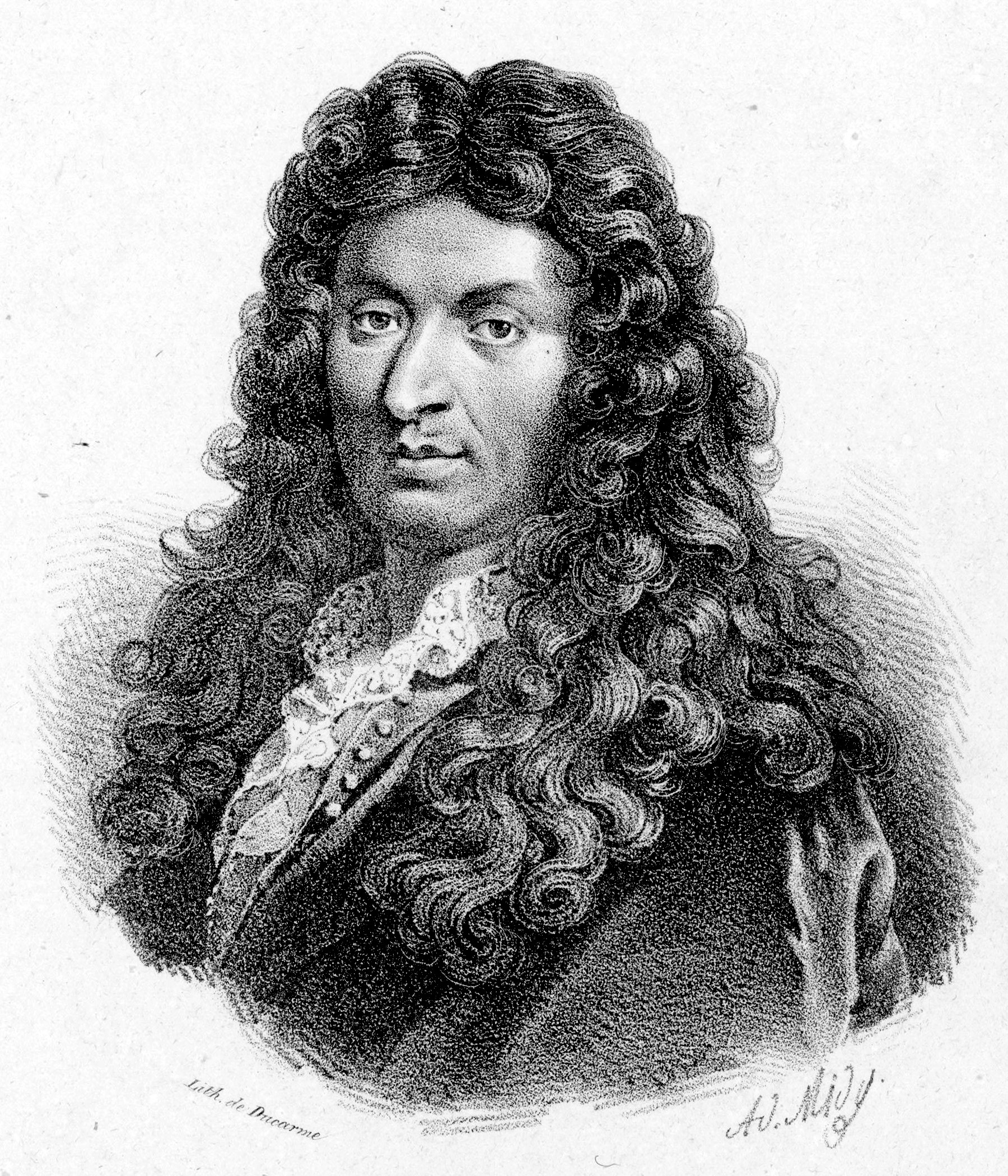
Jean-Baptiste Lully, around 1670

In 1672, Lully broke with Molière, who turned to Marc-Antoine Charpentier. Having acquired Pierre Perrin's opera privilege, Lully became the director of the Académie Royale de Musique, that is, the royal opera, which performed in the Palais-Royal. Between 1673 and 1687, he produced a new opera almost yearly and fiercely protected his monopoly over that new genre.

After Queen Marie-Thérèse's death in 1683 and the king's secret marriage to Mme de Maintenon, devotion came to the fore at court. The king's enthusiasm for opera dissipated; he was annoyed by Lully's dissolute life and homosexual encounters. Lully had avoided getting too close to the secret homosexual grouping that had gathered in the court around the Duc de Vendôme, the Comte de Tallard and the Duc de Gramont. But in 1685, he was accused of improper relations with a page boy living in his household called Brunet. Brunet was removed after a police raid, and Lully escaped punishment. However, to show his general displeasure, Louis XIV made a point of not inviting Lully to perform Armide at Versailles the following year.

Lully was not known for his gentleness; historian Rupert Hughes writes that "his temper was enforced by a ruthless brutality," noting that he disinherited his own son. In one episode reported by biographer François-Joseph Fétis, Lully discovered that his chorister Marie Le Rochois was pregnant. Enraged that this might interfere with the debut of Armide, he kicked her stomach until she miscarried.

Lully died from gangrene, having struck his foot with his long conducting staff during a performance of his Te Deum to celebrate Louis XIV's recovery from surgery. He refused to have his toe amputated. This resulted in gangrene propagating through his body and ultimately infecting the greater part of his brain, causing his death. He died in Paris and was buried in the church of Notre-Dame-des-Victoires, where his tomb with its marble bust can still be seen. All three of his sons (Louis Lully, Jean-Baptiste Lully fils, and Jean-Louis Lully) had musical careers as successive surintendants of the King's Music.

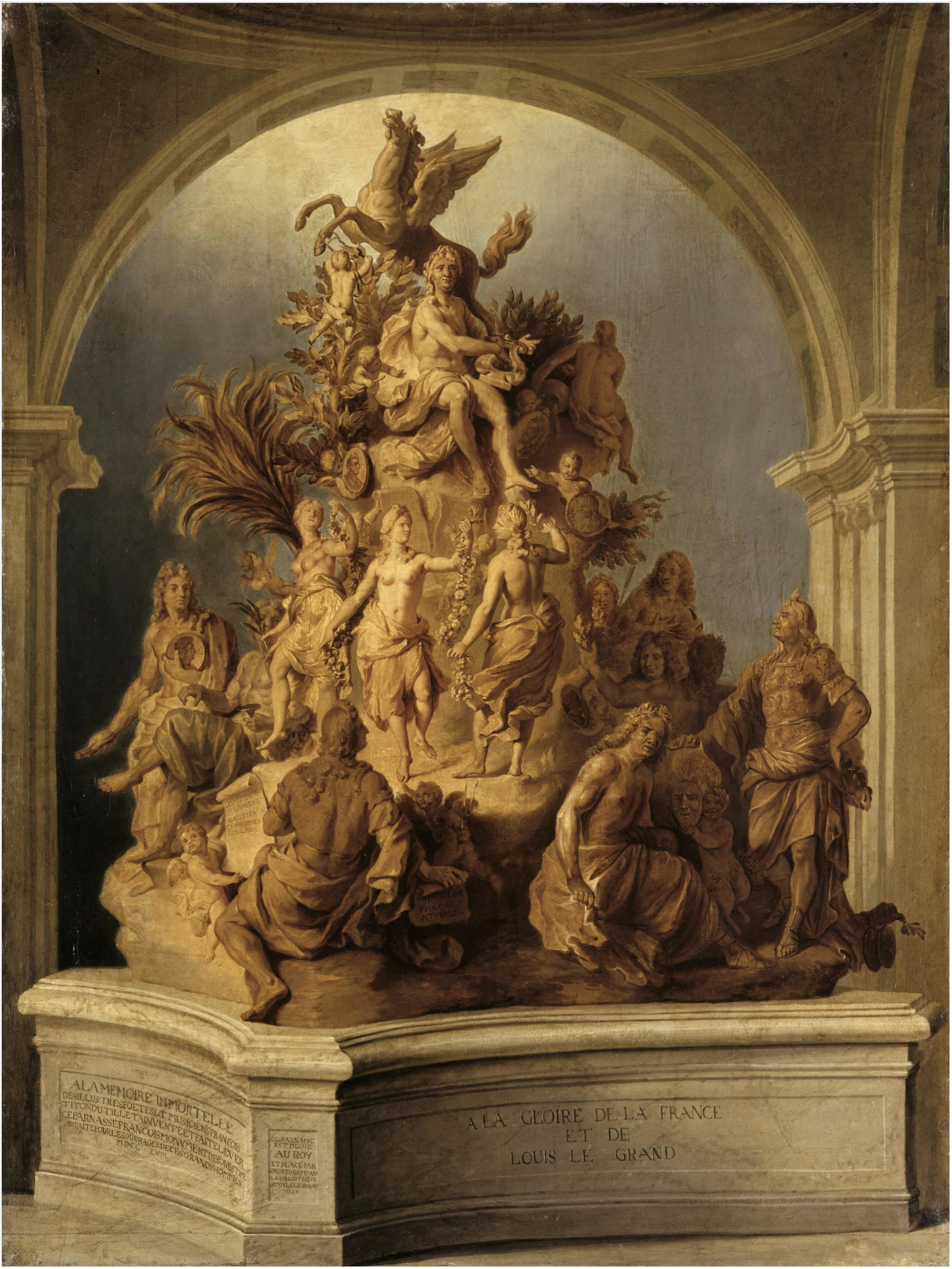
Nicolas de Poilly the Younger's painting of Titon du Tillet's French Parnassus, 1723

Lully himself was posthumously given a conspicuous place on Titon du Tillet's Parnasse François ("the French Mount Parnassus"). In the engraving, he stands to the left, on the lowest level, his right arm extended and holding a scroll of paper with which to beat time. (The bronze ensemble has survived and is part of the collections of the Museum of Versailles.) Titon honored Lully as:

the prince of French musicians, ... the inventor of that beautiful and grand French music, such as our operas and the grand pieces for voices and instruments that were only imperfectly known before him. He brought it [music] to the peak of perfection and was the father of our most illustrious musicians working in that musical form. ... Lully entertained the king infinitely, by his music, by the way he performed it, and by his witty remarks. The prince was also very fond of Lully and showered him with benefits in a most gracious way.

== Music, style and influence ==
Lully's music was written during the Middle Baroque period, 1650 to 1700. Typical of Baroque music is the use of the basso continuo as the driving force behind the music. The pitch standard for the French opera at the time was about 392 Hz for A above middle C, a whole tone lower than modern practice where A is usually 440 Hz.

Lully's music is known for its power, liveliness in its fast movements and its deep emotional character in its slower movements. Some of his most popular works are his passacailles (passacaglias) and chaconnes, which are dance movements found in many of his works such as Armide or Phaëton.

The influence of Lully's music produced a radical revolution in the style of the dances of the court itself. In the place of the slow and stately movements which had prevailed until then, he introduced lively ballets of rapid rhythm, often based on well-known dance types such as gavottes, menuets, rigaudons and sarabandes.

Through his collaboration with playwright Molière, a new music form emerged during the 1660s: the comédie-ballet which combined theater, comedy, incidental music and ballet. The popularity of these plays, with their sometimes lavish special effects, and the success and publication of Lully's operas and its diffusion beyond the borders of France, played a crucial role in synthesizing, consolidating and disseminating orchestral organization, scorings, performance practices, and repertory.

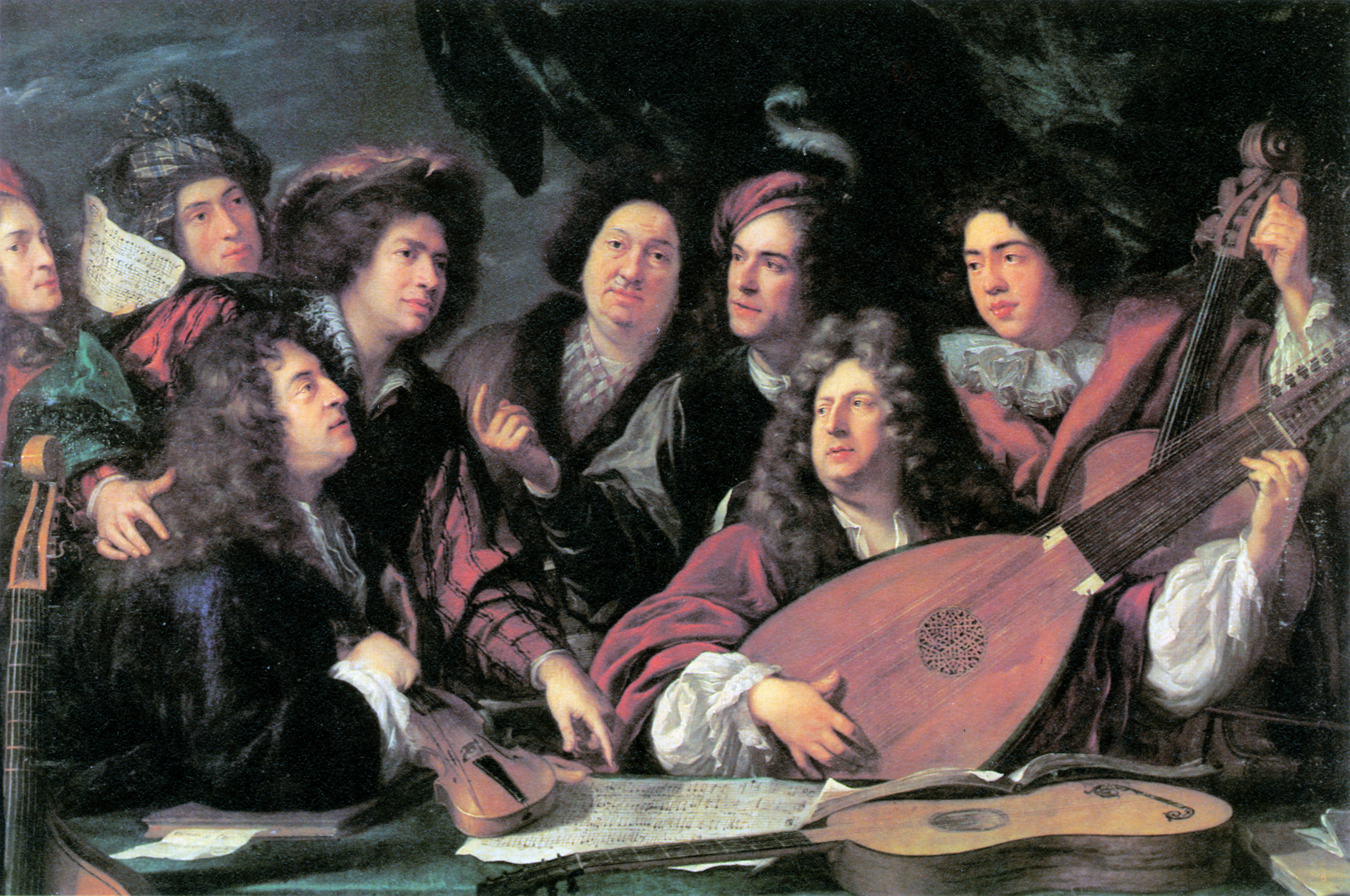
Portrait of Several Musicians and Artists by François Puget. The two main figures have been identified as Lully and the librettist Philippe Quinault. (Louvre)

The instruments in Lully's music were: five voices of strings such as dessus (a higher range than soprano), haute-contre (the instrumental equivalent of the high tenor voice by that name), taille (baritenor), quinte, and basse, divided as follows: one voice of violins, three voices of violas, one voice of cello, and basse de viole (viole, viola da gamba). He also utilized guitar, lute, archlute, theorbo, harpsichord, organ, oboe, bassoon, recorder, flute, brass instruments (natural trumpet) and various percussion instruments (castanets, timpani).

He is often credited with introducing new instruments into the orchestra, but this legend needs closer scrutiny. He continued to use recorders in preference to the newer transverse flute, and the "hautbois" he used in his orchestra were transitional instruments, somewhere between shawms and so-called Baroque oboes.

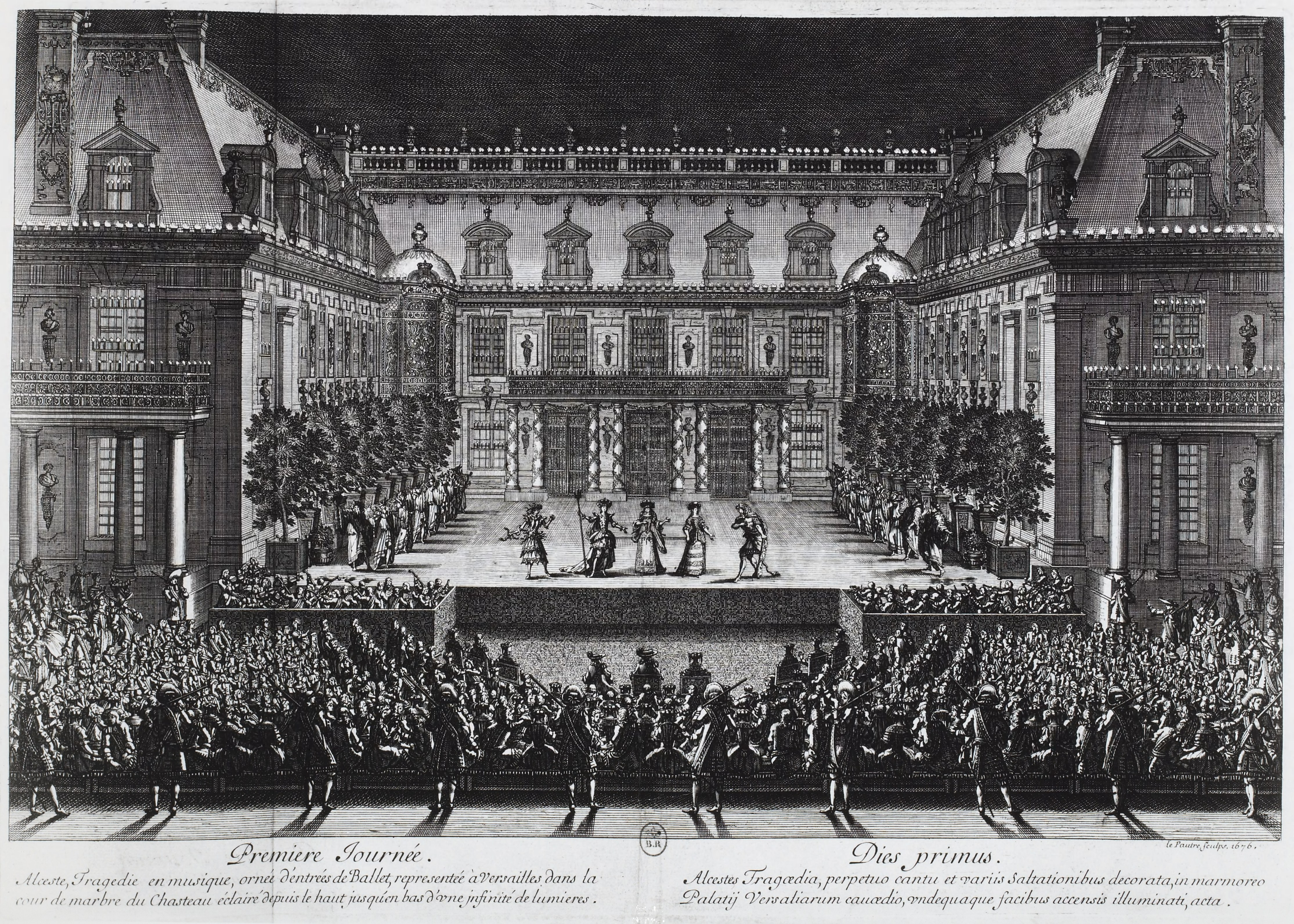
Jean-Baptiste Lully and Philippe Quinault's opera Alceste being performed in the marble courtyard at the Palace of Versailles, 1674

Lully created French-style opera as a musical genre (tragédie en musique or tragédie lyrique). Concluding that Italian-style opera was inappropriate for the French language, he and his librettist, Philippe Quinault, a respected playwright, employed the same poetics that dramatists used for verse tragedies: the 12-syllable "alexandrine" and the 10-syllable "heroic" poetic lines of the spoken theater were used for the recitative of Lully's operas and were perceived by their contemporaries as creating a very "natural" effect. Airs, especially if they were based on dances, were by contrast set to lines of less than 8 syllables. Lully also forsook the Italian method of dividing musical numbers into separate recitatives and arias, choosing instead to combine and intermingle the two, for dramatic effect. He and Quinault also opted for quicker story development, which was more to the taste of the French public.

Lully is credited with the invention in the 1650s of the French overture, a form used extensively in the Baroque and Classical eras, especially by Johann Sebastian Bach and George Frideric Handel.

== Lully's works ==
=== Sacred music ===
Lully's grand motets were written for the royal chapel, usually for vespers or for the King's daily Low Mass. Lully did not invent the genre, he built upon it. Grand motets often were psalm settings, but for a time during the 1660s, Lully used texts written by Pierre Perrin, a neo-Latin poet. Lully's petit motets were probably composed for the nuns at the convent of the Assumption, rue Saint-Honoré.

* [6] Motets à deux chœurs pour la Chapelle du roi, published 1684
- Miserere, at court, winter 1664
- Plaude laetare, text by Perrin, 7 April 1668
- Te Deum, at Fontainebleau, 9 September 1677
- De profundis, May 1683
- Dies irae, 1683
- Benedictus
- Domine salvum fac regem, grand motet
- Exaudiat te Dominus, grand motet, 1687
- Jubilate Deo, grand motet, 1660?
- Notus in Judea Deux, grand motet
- O lacrymae, grand motet, text by Perrin, at Versailles, 1664
- Quare fremuerunt, grand motet, at Versailles, 19 April 1685
- Petits motets: Anima Christi; Ave coeli manus, text by Perrin; Dixit Dominus; Domine salvum; Laudate pueri; O dulcissime Domine; Omnes gentes; O sapientia; Regina coeli; Salve regina

=== Ballets de cour ===
When Lully began dancing and composing for court ballets, the genre blossomed and markedly changed in character. At first, as composer of instrumental music for the King's chamber, Lully wrote overtures, dances, dance-like songs, descriptive instrumental pieces such as combats, and parody-like récits with Italian texts. He was so captivated by the French overture that he wrote four of them for the Ballet d'Alcidiane.

The development of his instrumental style can be discerned in his chaconnes. He experimented with all types of compositional devices and found new solutions that he later exploited to the full in his operas. For example, the chaconne that ends the Ballet de la Raillerie (1659) has 51 couplets plus an extra free part; in Le Bourgeois gentilhomme (1670), he added a vocal line to the chaconne for the Scaramouches.

The first menuets appear in the Ballet de la Raillerie (1659) and the Ballet de l'Impatience (1661). In Lully's ballets one can also see the emergence of concert music, for example, pieces for voice and instruments that could be excerpted and performed alone and that prefigure his operatic airs: "Bois, ruisseau, aimable verdure" from the Ballet des saisons (1661), the lament "Rochers, vous êtes sourds" and Orpheus's sarabande "Dieu des Enfers", from the Ballet de la naissance de Vénus (1665).

* Ballet du Temps, text by Benserade, at Louvre, 30 November 1654
- Ballet des plaisirs, text by Benserade, at Louvre, 4 February 1655
- Le Grand Ballet des Bienvenus, text by Benserade, at Compiègne, 30 May 1655
- Le Ballet de la Revente des habits, text by Benserade, at court, 6 January 1655 (or 1661?)
- Ballet of Psyché ou de la puissance de l'Amour, text by Benserade, at Louvre, 16 January 1656
- La Galanterie du temps, mascarade, anonymous text, 14 February 1656
- L'Amour malade, text by Buti, at Louvre, 17 January 1657
- Ballet royal d'Alcidiane, Benserade, at court, 14 February 1658
- Ballet de la Raillerie, text by Benserade, at court, 19 February 1659
- six ballet entrées serving as intermèdes to Cavalli's Xerse, at Louvre, 22 November 1660
- Ballet mascarade donné au roi à Toulouse, April 1660
- Ballet royal de l'impatience, text by Buti, at Louvre, 19 February 1661
- Ballet des Saisons, text by Benserade, at Fontainebleau, 23 July 1661
- ballet danced between the acts of Hercule amoureux, text by Buti, at Tuileries, 7 February 1662
- Ballet des Arts, text by Benserade, at Palais-Royal, 8 January 1663
- Les Noces du village, mascarade ridicule, text by Benserade, at Vincennes, 3 October 1663
- Les Amours déguisés, text by Périgny, at Palais-Royal, 13 February 1664
- incidental music between the acts of Oedipe, play by Pierre Corneille, Fontainebleau, 3 August 1664
- Mascarade du Capitaine ou l'Impromptu de Versailles, anonymous text, at Palais-Royal, 1664 or February 1665
- Ballet royal de la Naissance de Vénus, text by Benserade, at Palais-Royal, 26 January 1665
- Ballet des Gardes ou des Délices de la campagne, anonymous text, 1665
- Le Triomphe de Bacchus, mascarade, anonymous text, at court, 9 January 1666
- Ballet des Muses, Benserade, at St-Germain-en-Laye, 1666
- Le Carnaval, mascarade, text by Benserade, at Louvre, 18 January 1668
- Ballet royal de Flore, text by Benserade, at Tuileries, 13 February 1669
- Le Triomphe de l'Amour, text by Benserade and Quinault, at St-Germain-en-Laye, 2 December 1681
- Le Temple de la Paix, text by Quinault, at Fontainebleau, 20 October 1685

=== Music for the theater (intermèdes) ===
Intermèdes became part of a new genre, the comédie-ballet, in 1661, when Molière described them as "ornaments which have been mixed with the comedy" in his preface to Les Fâcheux. "Also, to avoid breaking the thread of the piece by these interludes, it was deemed advisable to weave the ballet in the best manner one could into the subject, and make but one thing of it and the play." The music for the premiere of Les Fâcheux was composed by Pierre Beauchamp, but Lully later provided a sung courante for act 1, scene 3. With Le Mariage forcé and La Princesse d'Élide (1664), intermèdes by Lully began to appear regularly in Molière's plays: for those performances there were six intermèdes, two at the beginning and two at the end, and one between each of the three acts. Lully's intermèdes reached their apogee in 1670–1671, with the elaborate incidental music he composed for Le Bourgeois gentilhomme and Psyché. After his break with Molière, Lully turned to opera; but he collaborated with Jean Racine for a fete at Sceaux in 1685, and with Campistron for an entertainment at Anet in 1686.

Most of Molière's plays were first performed for the royal court.

* Les Fâcheux, play by Molière, at Vaux-le-Vicomte, 17 August 1661
- Le Mariage forcé, ballet, play by Molière, at Louvre, 29 January 1664
- Les Plaisirs de l'Isle enchantée, play by Molière, at Versailles, 7–12 May 1664
- L'Amour médecin, comédie-ballet, play by Molière, at Versailles, 14 September 1665
- La Pastorale comique, play by Molière, at St-Germain-en-Laye, 5 January 1667
- Le Sicilien, play by Molière, at St-Germain-en-Laye, 14 February 1667
- Le Grand Divertissement royal de Versailles (Georges Dandin), play by Molière, at Versailles, 18 August 1668
- La Grotte de Versailles, eclogue in music, play by Quinault, April (?) 1668
- Le Divertissement de Chambord (Monsieur de Pourceaugnac), play by Molière, at Chambord, 6 October 1669
- Le Divertissement royal (Les Amants magnifiques), play by Molière, at St-Germain-en-Laye, 7 February 1670
- Le Bourgeois gentilhomme, comédie-ballet, play by Molière, at Chambord, 14 October 1670
- Idylle sur la Paix, text by Racine, at Sceaux, 16 July 1685

=== Operas ===
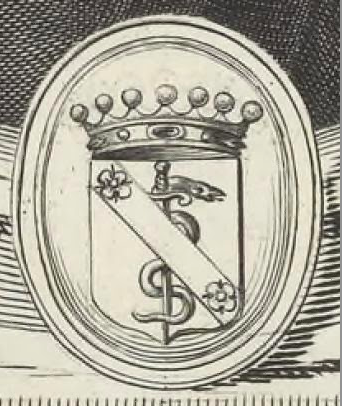
Lully's coat of arms

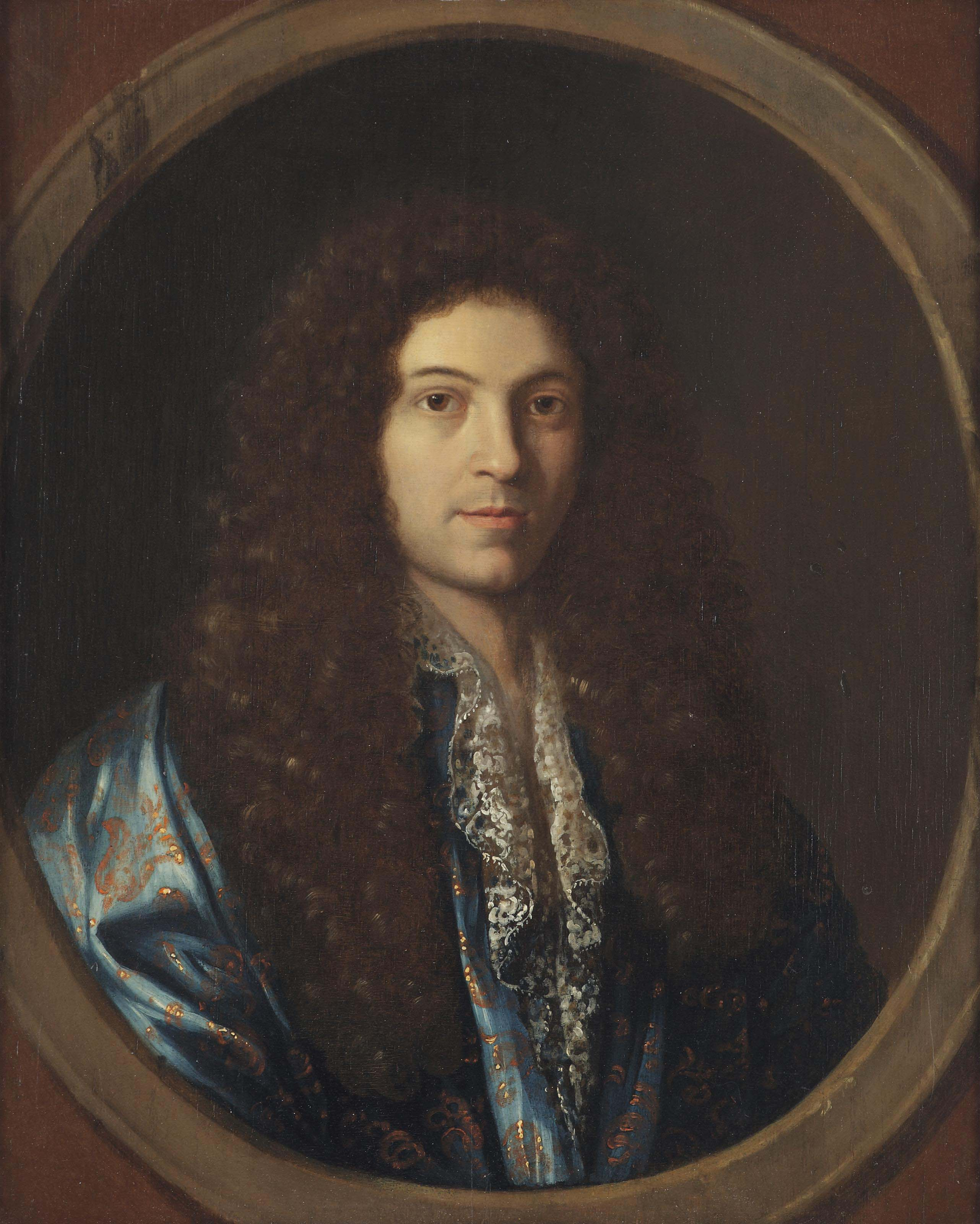
Portrait of a gentleman, traditionally said to be Jean-Baptiste Lully, by Paul Mignard

With five exceptions, each of Lully's operas was described as a tragédie mise en musique, or tragedy set to music. The exceptions were: Bellérophon, Cadmus et Hermione, and Psyché, each called simply a tragédie; and Les fêtes de l'Amour et de Bacchus, described as a pastorale, and Acis et Galathée, which is a pastorale héroïque. (The term tragédie lyrique came later.)

With Lully, the point of departure was always a verse libretto, in most cases by the verse dramatist Philippe Quinault. For the dance pieces, Lully would hammer out rough chords and a melody on the keyboard, and Quinault would invent words. For the recitative, Lully imitated the speech melodies and dramatic emphasis used by the best actors in the spoken theater. His attentiveness to transferring theatrical recitation to sung music shaped French opera and song for a century.

Unlike Italian opera of the day, which was rapidly moving toward opera seria with its alternating recitative and da capo airs, in Lully's operas the focus was on drama, expressed by a variety of vocal forms: monologs, airs for two or three voices, rondeaux and French-style da capo airs where the chorus alternates with singers, sung dances, and vaudeville songs for a few secondary characters. In like manner the chorus performed in several combinations: the entire chorus, the chorus singing as duos, trios or quartets, the dramatic chorus, the dancing chorus.

The intrigue of the plot culminated in a vast tableau, for example, the sleep scene in Atys, the village wedding in Roland, or the funeral in Alceste. Soloists, chorus and dancers participated in this display, producing astonishing effects thanks to machinery. In contrast to Italian opera, the various instrumental genres were present to enrich the overall effect: French overture, dance airs, rondeaux, marches, "simphonies" that painted pictures, preludes, ritournelles. Collected into instrumental suites or transformed into trios, these pieces had enormous influence and affected instrumental music across Europe.

The earliest operas were performed at the indoor Bel Air tennis court (on the grounds of the Luxembourg Palace) that Lully had converted into a theater. The first performance of later operas either took place at court, or in the theater at the Palais-Royal, which had been made available to Lully's Academy. Once premiered at court, operas were performed for the public at the Palais-Royal.

- Psyché, tragi-comedy, Molière, play by Pierre Corneille and Quinault, at the Théâtre des Tuileries, 17 January 1671
- Les Fêtes de l'Amour et de Bacchus, pastoral, text by Quinault, Molière and Périgny, at the Salle du Bel-Air, a converted tennis court (jeu de paume), 15 (?) November 1672
- Cadmus et Hermione, tragedy by Quinault, at tennis court (jeu de paume) of Bel-Air, 27 (?) April 1673
- Alceste ou le Triomphe d'Alcide, tragedy by Quinault, at tennis court (jeu de paume) of Bel-Air, 19 January 1674
- Thésée, tragedy by Quinault, at St-Germain-en-Laye, 11 January 1675
- Atys, tragedy by Quinault, at St-Germain-en-Laye, 10 January 1676
- Isis, tragedy by Quinault ornamented by ballet entrées, at St-Germain-en-Laye, 5 January 1677
- Psyché, tragedy by Quinault, Thomas Corneille and Fontanelle, at Palais-Royal, 19 April 1678
- Bellérophon, tragedy by Thomas Corneille, Fontenelle and Boileau, at Palais-Royal, 31 January 1679
- Proserpine, tragedy by Quinault ornamented with ballet entrées, at St-Germain-en-Laye, 3 February 1680
- Persée, tragedy by Quinault, at Palais-Royal, 18 April 1682
- Phaëton, tragedy by Quinault, at Versailles, 6 January 1683
- Amadis, tragedy by Quinault, at Palais-Royal, 18 January 1684
- Roland, tragedy by Quinault, at Versailles (Grande Écurie), 8 January 1685
- Armide, tragedy by Quinault, 1686
- Acis et Galatée, pastorale héroïque, text by Campistron, chateau of Anet, 6 September 1686
- Achille et Polyxène, tragedy by Campistron, completed by Colasse, at Palais-Royal, 7/23 November 1687

== Depictions in fiction ==
- Henry Prunières's 1929 novel La Vie illustre et libertine de Jean-Baptiste Lully (Paris: Plon) was the first 20th-century novel about Lully that raised supposed questions about the composer's "moral character."
- Gérard Corbiau's 2000 film Le Roi danse (The King is dancing) presents libertine and pagan Lully as a natural ally of Louis XIV in the King's conflicts with the Catholic establishment. The movie depicts Lully with a concealed romantic interest in the King.
- In 2011, the BBC's hit children's show Horrible Histories featured the death of Lully in the skit "Stupid Deaths" in a live show at the Prom.
- In 2025, the French children's show "Belfort & Lupin" featured Lully in the episode "Major Dischord."

Preceded by Pierre Perrin and Robert Cambert	director of the Académie royale de musique 1672–1687	Succeeded by Jean-Nicolas de Francine
