= Médée et Jason =

Opera by the French composer Joseph François Salomon

- Opera by Joseph François Salomon
- Title page of 1736 printing
- Librettist: Simon-Joseph Pellegrin
- Premiere: 24 April 1713; Académie Royale de Musique

Médée et Jason (Medea and Jason) is a French opera by composer Joseph François Salomon and librettist Simon-Joseph Pellegrin, written in the tradition of lyric tragedy (tragédie en musique or tragédie lyrique). The Académie Royale de Musique (Royal Academy of Music) premiered it on 24 April 1713.

== Background ==
In Médée et Jason, composer Joseph-François Salomon and librettist Simon-Joseph Pellegrin drew on a long literary and musical history. The myth of the tragic heroine Medea had inspired writers from Euripides and Seneca the Younger to Pierre Corneille and Hilaire-Bernard de Longepierre, as well as composers Jean-Baptiste Lully and Marc-Antoine Charpentier.

Salomon trained on viol and belonged to what is sometimes called the Provençal school, alongside composers André Campra and Jean-Joseph Mouret. Pellegrin, an Abbé (abbot), wrote under the pseudonym Antoine de la Roque.

== Composition ==
The opera follows the French tragédie en musique tradition founded by Lully, with a prologue, five acts, clear declamation, choruses, dances, and music shaped by the drama. It also reflects early 18th-century stylistic shifts, including a taste for Prosper Jolyot de Crébillon's theater, with its intense, almost expressionist drama. (Note: Crébillon aimed to evoke the terror and horror of Greek tragedy, wrote Jean Le Rond d'Alembert, by showing human corruption and cruelty on stage.) In Médée et Jason, Salomon and Pellegrin stressed the Medea myth's dark, violent elements, adapting it to this aesthetic.

== Reception ==
The Académie Royale de Musique premiered it on 24 April 1713, and Christophe Ballard published it that year. It became one of the most successful works in their 18th-century repertoire, with five revivals in four decades, and was the first in a string of tragédies en musique blending heightened emotional expression and voyeuristic horror, including Gervais's Hypermnestre (1716), Destouches's Sémiramis (1718), and Stuck's Polydore (1720).

Its initial two-month run was followed by a revised revival later that year, as well as performances in provincial centers, including Lyon, though Salomon's next opera, Théonoé (1715), failed. In 1726, Brussels's La Monnaie performed Médée et Jason abroad, and in 1727, its Paris revival ran for thirty-one performances, brought exceptional acclaim, and prompted the publication of a supplement documenting revisions to the score. Pellegrin went on to successes under his given name, including with composer Jean-Philippe Rameau.

Inserted Italian aria for Marie Fel (1736)

Further performances in 1736 incorporated elements of contemporary Italian opera, including an inserted Italian aria sung by Marie Fel. A commentator named Dubuisson wrote that Lully "never wrote four operas better than this one". A manuscript from this time shows others' revisions of the opera.
