= Michel Blondy =

Michel Blondy (1675–1739) was a French choreographer, dancer and ballet master.

== Works ==
All his choreographies were premiered at the Académie royale de musique

- 1714: Les Fêtes de Thalie, music by Mouret
- 1721: Les Fêtes vénitiennes, music by Campra
- 1728: La Princesse d'Élide, loosely based on the play by Molière, music by Alexandre de Villeneuve
- 1728: Hypermnestre, music by Gervais
- 1729: Les Amours des déesses, music by Lully (on a libretto by Philippe Quinault)
- 1730: Phëton, music by Lully
- 1732: Callirhoé, music by Destouches
- 1732: Les Sens, music by Mouret
- 1733: Les Fêtes grecques et romaines, music by Blamont
- 1734: Les Éléments, music by Lalande et Destouches
- 1734: Pirithoüs, music by Mouret
- 1734: Les Plaisirs champêtres, music by Rebel
- 1735: Les Indes galantes, music by Rameau
- 1736: Les Voyages de l'amour, music by Boismortier
- 1739: Alceste, music by Lully

== Notes ==
| Preceded by Louis Pécour | Director of Paris Opera Ballet; 1729–1739 | Succeeded by Antoine Bandieri de Laval |
