= Jacques-Philippe d'Orneval =

Jacques-Philippe d’Orneval called Dorneval was an 18th-century French playwright, born in Paris at an unknown date and died in 1766.

We know nothing about his origins and life. He wrote more than 80 theatre plays for the theatres de la foire, alone or in collaboration with Alain-René Lesage, Louis Fuzelier, Alexis Piron, Joseph de La Font and Jacques Autreau.

He ended his life in old age, having a passion for chemistry and Philosopher's Stone.

== Works ==
- Arlequin traitant, three-act opéra comique, in prose and vaudevilles (22 March 1716, Foire Saint-Germain)
- Les Amours de Nanterre, opéra comique in one act in collaboration with Autreau and Lesage (1718, Foire Saint-Laurent)
- L'Ile des Amazones, one-act play in collaboration with Lesage (1718, Foire Saint-Laurent). Banned by the Opéra-Comique.
- Le Monde renversé, one-act play in collaboration with Lesage (1718, Foire Saint-Laurent)
- La Forêt de Dodone, one-act play in collaboration with Fuzelier and Lesage (1721, Foire Saint-Germain)
- Le Rémouleur d'amour, one-act play in collaboration with Fuzelier and Lesage (5 février 1722, Théâtre des Marionnettes de Laplace à la Foire Saint-Germain)
- La Grand-mère amoureuse, three-act play in collaboration with Fuzelier, music by Gillier (18 February 1726, Foire Saint-Germain). Parody of Atys by Quinault and Lully.
- Les Comédiens corsaires, prologue in collaboration with Fuzelier and Lesage (20 September 1726, Foire Saint-Laurent)
- Les Amours déguisés, one-act play in collaboration with Lesage (20 September 1726, Foire Saint-Laurent)
- Achmet et Almanzine, three-act play in collaboration with Lesage and Fuzelier, music by Gillier (30 June 1728, Foire Saint-Laurent)
- L'Opéra-Comique assiégé, in collaboration with Lesage (26 March 1730, Foire Saint-Germain)

« Lesage et Dorneval ont quitté du haut style
La beauté;
Et pour Polichinelle ont abandonné Gilles
La rareté !
Il ne leur reste plus qu'à montrer par la ville
La curiosité. »
(Fuzelier mentioned by Pierre Laujon, Œuvres choisies, 1811)
