= Méléagre =

Opera by Jean-Baptiste Stuck

Méléagre (Meleager) is an opera by the French-Italian composer Jean-Baptiste Stuck, first performed at the Académie Royale de Musique (the Paris Opera) on 24 May 1709. It takes the form of a tragédie en musique in a prologue and five acts. The libretto, by François-Antoine Jolly, is based on the Greek legend of Meleager.

== Sources ==
- (in French) Libretto at "Livrets baroques"
- (in French) Félix Clément and Pierre Larousse Dictionnaire des Opéras, Paris, 1881, page 448.
