= Messe de minuit pour Noël =

1694 mass by Marc-Antoine Charpentier

- Mass by Marc-Antoine Charpentier
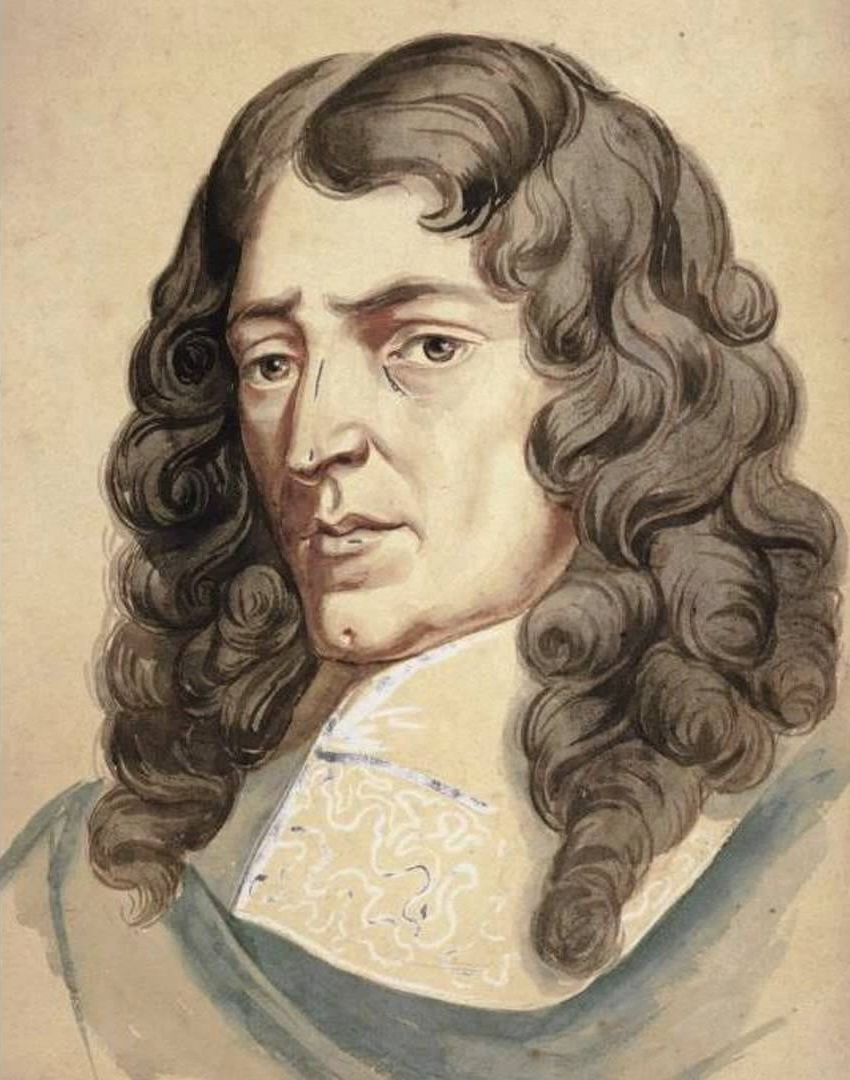
- Portrait possibly of Charpentier
- Catalogue: H. 9
- Text: Mass ordinary
- Language: Latin
- Based on: French Christmas carols
- Composed: c. 1694
- Scoring: SATB soloists and choir; two flutes; strings; organ

Messe de minuit pour Noël (Midnight mass for Christmas), H.9, (Note: Charpentier's compositions were catalogued by H. Wiley Hitchcock in his Les œuvres de Marc-Antoine Charpentier: Catalogue Raisonné, (Paris: Picard, 1982); references to works are often accompanied by their H (for Hitchcock) number.) is a mass for four voices and orchestra by Marc-Antoine Charpentier, written in 1694 based on the melodies of ten French Christmas carols. Charpentier called for eight soloists, a duo of two sopranos and two trios of alto, tenor and bass, but it can be performed by five soloists. Choir and orchestra are in four parts, scored for flutes, strings (violins and viols), organ and basso continuo. The mass is regarded as unique in both the composer's work and in the genre. While in Charpentier's time, the mass was performed by all-male choirs, it has later been performed and recorded also by mixed choirs with modern instruments.

== History ==
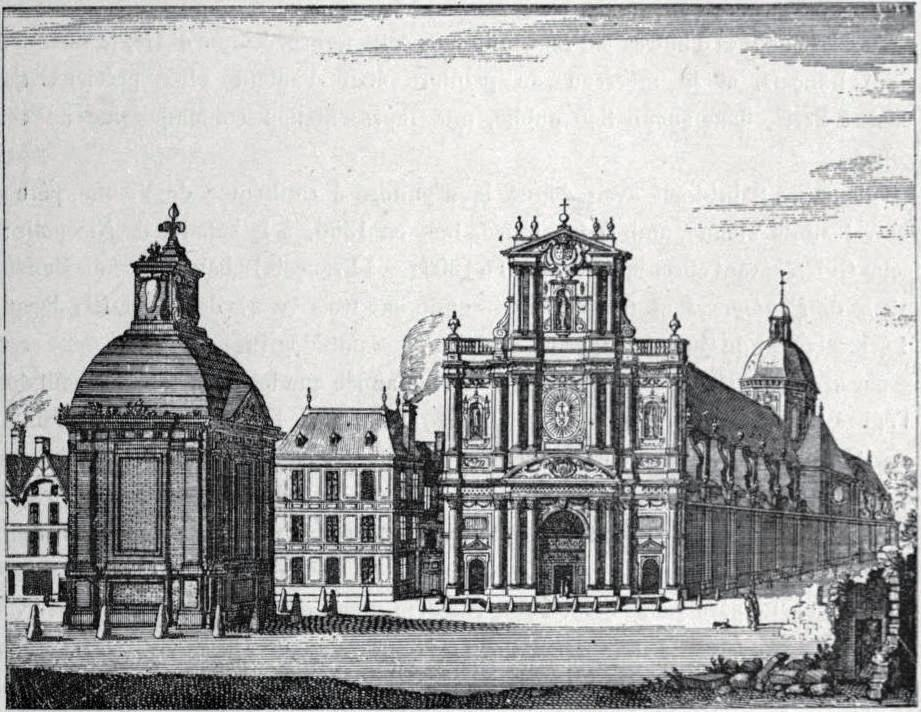
L'église Saint-Louis

Charpentier composed the Messe de minuit pour Noël c. 1694 for the Jesuit church of the Église Saint-Louis in Paris where he was music director. He upheld a longstanding tradition for this mass to be celebrated around midnight as the first of three on Christmas Day: to base the music on melodies of French noëls (Christmas carols). Some of these tunes were secular in origin, and in theory the use of secular material in church music had been forbidden by the Council of Trent, but long traditions were tolerated. Charpentier had written instrumental version of nine carols, of which he used seven also for the mass. The texts of the mass ordinary were matched with ten carol tunes. The music is set for four vocal parts and a small orchestra of two flutes, strings and organ.

=== Publication ===
Charpentier's manuscript is held by the Bibliothèque nationale de France. Eulenberg brought out an edition in 1996. This was claimed to be an urtext edition, although that description has been disputed. A critical edition was produced by Carus-Verlag in 2016 and CMBV in 1997.

== Scoring and structure ==
Charpentier structured the mass in several movements. He scored it for soloists and choir, two flutes, two violins, two violas, bass, organ and basso continuo. In his wording, the voices are dessus, haute-contre (high tenor), taille (tenor) and bass, which were all male singers at his time. Modern performances also use SATB mixed choirs. Charpentier called for instruments: "2 flutes, 2 violons, 2 altos, basses, orgue, et basse-continue. Flutes could be recorders which might correspond to pastoral music, but the range is better suited to flauto traverso; "violons" are violins; altos and tailles stand for alto and tenor viols; basses or "basses de chœur" mean a bass viol that goes with the vocal bass in choral movements. The instrumental music is in four parts and basso continuo, with the flutes and violins playing in the soprano range. Some vocal parts are marked for soloists ("seule"), always in groups: a duo of two sopranos, or a trio of alto, tenor and bass. He thought of two of the trio groups, so eight soloists, but the music can also be performed by only one trio, which makes for five soloists, SSATB. The mass takes about 25 minutes to perform.

Kyrie

1. Kyrie I "Joseph est bien marié" ("Quand Biron voulut danser")
2. Christe eleison "Or nous dites, Marie"
3. Kyrie II "Une jeune pucelle"

Gloria

4. Et in terra pax
5. Laudamus te "Tous les bourgeois de Châtres"
6. Gratias agimus tibi
7. Domine Deus Rex coelestis
8. Quoniam tu solus Sanctus "Où s'en vont ces gais bergers" ("Çà, bergers, assemblons-nous")
9. Amen

Credo

10. Patrem omnipotentem
11. Deum de Deo "Vous qui désirez"
12. Genitum non factum
13. Et incarnatus est
14. Crucifixus "Voici le jour solennel de Noël"
15. Et ascendit in coelum
16. Et in Spiritum Sanctum "À la venue de Noël"
17. . Et unam sanctam

Offertorium (instrumental)
"Laissez paître vos bêtes"
Sanctus e Benedictus

18. Sanctus "O dieu ! Que n'étais-je en vie"
19. Benedictus

Agnus Dei

20. Agnus Dei "À minuit fut fait un réveil"

Some of the sections use a single carol, including Kyrie I, for which Charpentier quoted a cheerful carol first unchanged and repeated, then with different instrumentation and some imitation, then in two more again different treatments. In Kyrie II, he does not quote the carol completely but only the beginning for imitation music. He did not write a Kyrie III, but the organ would repeat the carol from Kyrie 1.

== Recordings ==
The Messe de minuit pour Noël H.9 was recorded by the Choir of King's College, Cambridge, and the English Chamber Orchestra conducted by David Willcocks in 1967, and in 1988 by the Choir of St John's College, Cambridge, and the City of London Sinfonia, conducted by George Guest. CDs EMI.

The Messe de minuit pour Noël H.9 was recorded with In nativitatem Domini Canticum H.314, including instrumental settings H.534 n°2, 3, 4, 7, & H.531 n°1 of carols used in the mass, in 1985 by L’Ensemble vocal et instrumental de Nantes conducted by Paul Colléaux. CD Arion.

The Messe de minuit pour Noël H.9 was recorded by the Virgin Consort conducted by Kyler Brown in 1995. CD Gothic records.

The Messe de minuit pour Noël H.9 was recorded, with other Christmas music, In nativitatem Domini Canticum H.416 by Charpentier including four instrumental settings (H.531 n°2, H.534 n°3,4,6) of carols used in the mass, in 2002 by Les Arts Florissants Chorus and Orchestra, conducted by William Christie. CD Erato.

The Messe de minuit pour Noël H.9 was recorded with Dixit Dominus H.204 & Te Deum H.146 by Aradia Ensemble conducted by Kevin Mallon. CD Naxos 2003.

The Messe de minuit pour Noël H.9 was recorded, with other Christmas music, In nativitatem Domini Canticum H.416 n°4, In nativitate Domini Nostri Jesu Christi Canticum H.421, Alma Redemptoris H.44, Te Deum H.147 by Charpentier including three instrumental settings, Interlude instrumental from H.416, H.534 n°3 & H.531 n°2 of carols used in the mass, in 2023 by L’Ensemble Corresondances conducted by Sèbastien Daucé. CD Harmonia Mundi.

The Messe de minuit pour Noël H.9 was recorded with La Pastorale sur la naissance de Notre Seigneur Jesus Christ H.483 and Interlude instrumental from H.416 n°4 by La Capella Reial de Catalunya, Le Concert des Nations conducted by Jordi Savall. CD AliaVox 2023.

The Messe de minuit pour Noël H.9, was recorded with In nativitatem Domini Canticum H.416, Noëls sur les instruments H.531 & H.534, conducted by Christophe Rousset. CD (Monteverdi productions ltd. SDG737. 2025).

The Messe de minuit pour Noël H.9, was recorded with Dialogus inter Angelos et Pastores Judae in Nativitatem Domini H.420, Noëls sur les instruments H.534, Dixit Dominus H.202, conducted by Gaétan Jarry. CD Château de Versailles spectacles 2025
