= Polydore =

French opera

Polydore (Polydorus) is an opera by the French-Italian composer Jean-Baptiste Stuck, first performed at the Académie Royale de Musique (the Paris Opera) on 15 February 1720. It takes the form of a tragédie en musique in a prologue and five acts.

Polydore is the last of Stuck's surviving operas. The libretto, by Simon-Joseph Pellegrin, is based on the third book of Virgil's Aeneid, while drawing upon Hyginus's Fabulae, among other sources. It treats the Greek legend of Polydorus, youngest son of King Priam of Troy, murdered by Polymestor, King of Thrace, for his treasure.

The work uses five-part strings in the style of Lully, with divertissements at the close of the first two acts. An unusual feature was to end the opera with the on-stage suicide of Polymnestor, which so shocked contemporary audiences that a chorus about the love of Deidamie and Polydore was inserted.

A recording (with the original ending) made in Budapest in September 2022 was released by Glossa in 2023, with Judith van Wanroij (Vénus and Déidamie), Hélène Guilmette (Ilione), Chloé Briot (three roles), Cyrille Dubois (five roles), Thomas Dolié (Polymnestor), Tassis Christoyannis (Polydore) and David Witczak (Neptune, the High Priest and the shade of Déiphile), the Purcell Choir and Orfeo Orchestra conducted by György Vashegyi, described as "a major discovery, adding substantially to the revival of French baroque opera".

== Sources ==
- (in French) Félix Clément and Pierre Larousse Dictionnaire des Opéras, Paris, 1881, page 537.
