= Théonoé =

Théonoé is an opera by the French composer Joseph François Salomon, first performed at the Académie Royale de Musique (the Paris Opera) on 3 December 1715. It takes the form of a tragédie en musique in a prologue and five acts. The libretto is by Simon-Joseph Pellegrin, using the pseudonym "La Roque".

== Sources ==
- (in French) Libretto at "Livrets baroques"
- (in French) Félix Clément and Pierre Larousse Dictionnaire des Opéras, Paris, 1881, page 659.
