= O Come, Divine Messiah =

Old French Christmas carol

- by Simon-Joseph Pellegrin
- Native name: Venez, Divin Messie
- Genre: Christmas music
- Language: French, English

O Come, Divine Messiah is a popular Christian hymn for the season of Advent before Christmas. It recalls the time of waiting of the people of Israel before the birth of Christ. This song is at the same time a call to adore Jesus Christ present in the Eucharist. The melody is taken from an old French Christmas carol of the 16th century, Laissez paître vos bêtes ("Let your beasts graze").

== History ==
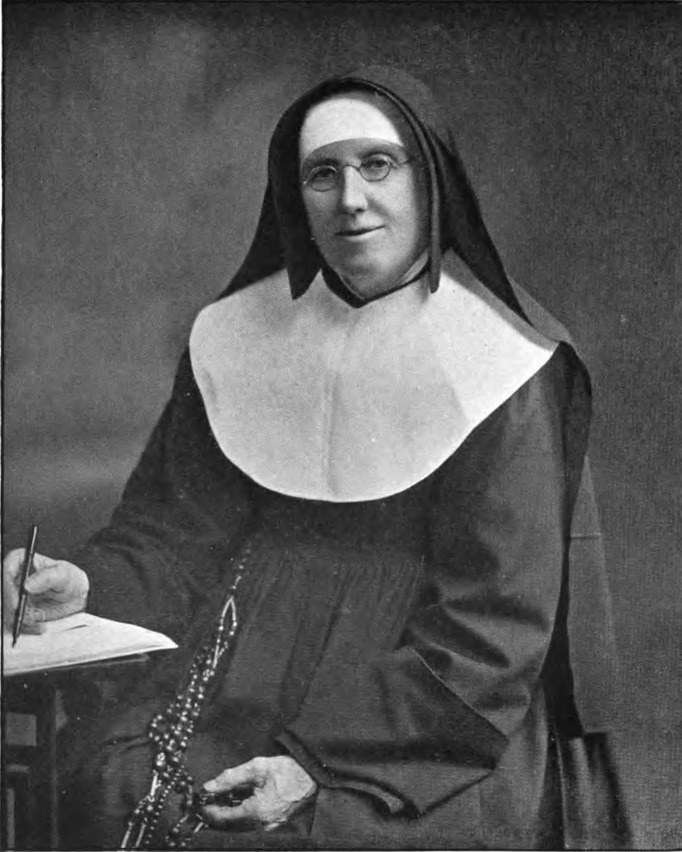
Sister Mary of St. Philip (Frances Mary Lescher) translated the carol into English in 1872.

O Come, Divine Messiah is adapted from an old French Christmas carol, Laissez paître vos bêtes, attested in the former French province of Bresse in the 16th century. The melody had already been plagiarized for satirical uses. The lyrics are the work of Abbot Simon-Joseph Pellegrin in the first half of the 18th century, who composed for the attention of the young Demoiselles de Saint-Cyr at the Maison royale de Saint-Louis many verses on the songs of the old Christmases of France, in order to modernize the text. The melody was also used by Marc-Antoine Charpentier for the offertory in his Messe de minuit pour Noël.

Since the 19th century, a modern version of the text, considerably impoverished, and a 4-part harmonization written in 1845 by Abbé Lambert have been in use in Catholic communities in France.

In 1872, the carol was translated into English by Sister Mary of Saint Philip.

== Lyrics ==
The original lyrics of Simon-Joseph Pellegrin (1663–1745) are inspired from Isaiah 4:14, Luke 2:4-14 and John 3:16-18.

18th century lyrics by Abbot Simon-Joseph Pellegrin

Venez, divin Messie,
Sauvez nos jours infortunés,
Vous êtes notre vie,
Venez, venez, venez.

1. Ah ! descendez, hâtez vos pas,
Seigneur de l’éternel trépas
Délivrez-nous, ne tardez pas.
Les temps se renouvellent
Sans voir nos crimes pardonnés
Les peuples vous appellent,
Venez, venez, venez.

2. Que nos soupirs soient entendus,
Les biens que nous avons perdus
Ne nous seront-ils pas rendus.
Voyez couler nos larmes
Grand Dieu si vous nous pardonnez
Nous n’aurons plus d’alarmes
Venez, venez, venez.

3. Ah! Puissions-nous chanter un jour
Dans votre bienheureuse cour
Et votre gloire et votre amour.
A nous livrer la guerre
Tous les démons sont acharnés
Pour vaincre leur colère,
Venez, venez, venez.

4. Si vous venez en ces bas lieux,
Nous vous verrons victorieux,
Fermer l’enfer, ouvrir les cieux.
Nous l’espérons sans cesse;
Les cieux nous furent destinés :
Tenez votre promesse;
Venez, venez, venez.

20th century update by Aimon-Marie Roguet and Louis Barjon

Venez divin Messie
Nous rendre espoir et nous sauver !
Vous êtes notre vie !
Venez, venez, venez !

1. Ô Fils de Dieu, ne tardez pas,
Par votre Corps donnez la joie
À notre monde en désarroi.
Redites-nous encore
De quel amour vous nous aimez;
Tant d'hommes vous ignorent !
Venez, venez, venez !

2. À Bethléem, les cieux chantaient,
Que le meilleur de vos bienfaits
C'était le don de votre paix.
Le monde la dédaigne :
Partout les cœurs sont divisés !
Qu'arrive votre règne !
Venez, venez, venez !

3. Vous êtes né pour les pécheurs,
Que votre grâce, ô Dieu Sauveur,
Dissipe en nous la nuit, la peur !
Seigneur que votre enfance
Nous fasse vivre en la clarté,
Soyez la délivrance,
Venez, venez, venez !

4. Quand vous viendrez au dernier jour
Juger le monde sur l'amour,
Que nous veillions pour ce retour !
Que votre main nous prenne
Dans le Royaume des sauvés !
Que meure enfin la haine,
Venez, venez, venez !

1872 translation of Sister Mary of St. Philip

O come, divine Messiah!
The world in silence waits the day
When hope shall sing its triumph,
And sadness flee away.

1, Dear Savior haste;
Come, come to earth,
Dispel the night and show your face,
And bid us hail the dawn of grace.

2. O come, divine Messiah!
The world in silence waits the day
When hope shall sing its triumph,
And sadness flee away.

3. O Christ, whom nations sigh for,
Whom priest and prophet long foretold,
Come break the captive fetters;
Redeem the long-lost fold.

4. Dear Savior haste;
Come, come to earth,
Dispel the night and show your face,
And bid us hail the dawn of grace.

5. O come, divine Messiah!
The world in silence waits the day
When hope shall sing its triumph,
And sadness flee away.

6. You come in peace and meekness,
And lowly will your cradle be;
All clothed in human weakness
Shall we your Godhead see.

7. Dear Savior haste;
Come, come to earth,
Dispel the night and show your face,
And bid us hail the dawn of grace.

8. O come, divine Messiah!
The world in silence waits the day
When hope shall sing its triumph,
And sadness flee away.
