= Les amours de Ragonde =

Les amours de Ragonde (The Loves of Ragonde, original title: Le mariage de Ragonde et de Colin ou La Veillée de Village) is an opera in three acts by Jean-Joseph Mouret with a libretto by Philippe Néricault Destouches. It was first performed at the Château de Sceaux in December, 1714. It is one of the first French comic operas.

== Performance history ==
The Grandes Nuits de Sceaux were 16 musical entertainments put on every fortnight from the spring of 1714 until early 1715 by the Duchesse de Maine at her chateau at Sceaux. The 13th fête, held in early December 1714, was organized by the Abbé de Vaubrun. The librettist Destouches wrote Le mariage de Ragonde et de Colin, and Mouret, who had become the duchess's Surintendant de la Musique soon after his arrival at her court in 1708, composed the music. Comedy was something of a novelty in French opera and the work looks forward to the genre of opéra comique which would become popular in the mid-18th century. Mouret also parodied many famous scenes from the prestigious tragédies en musique by Jean-Baptiste Lully, including moments from Armide, Atys and Alceste.

The next time the opera was heard was after Mouret's death, in a revised version performed by the Académie de musique at its theatre in the Palais-Royal in Paris on 30 January 1742, where it was a great success. It probably inspired Jean-Philippe Rameau to write his own comic opera about an ugly woman, Platée. The musical score of the 1714 version of Ragonde does not survive.

== Roles ==
Role	Voice type	Cast (1742 revival)
Ragonde	taille (baritenor - role en travesti)	Louis-Antoine Cuvillier
Colin	haute-contre	Pierre Jélyotte
Colette	soprano	Marie-Angélique Coupée (also spelled Coupé or Couppé)
Thibault	haute-contre	Jean-Antoine (or Jean-Baptiste) Bérard
Mathurine	soprano	Mlle Bourbonnois
Lucas	bass	Albert

== Synopsis ==
=== Act One: La soirée de village (The Village Junket) ===
Ragonde is an ugly old farmer's widow. At a party in the village she tells the young Colin of her love for him but Colin wants to marry her daughter, Colette, and mocks Ragonde. Lucas, who is also in love with Colette, tells the old woman how she can be revenged on Colin.

=== Act Two: Les lutins (The Goblins) ===
Colette is in love with Lucas, but their marriage is dependent on Colin becoming Ragonde's husband, otherwise Ragonde will not allow it. Colette, Lucas and his friend Thibault hatch a plot against Colin. Colette arranges an assignation with him in a wood in the dead of night. Colin arrives at the appointed place only to be terrified by "goblins" who claim to be in the service of the witch Ragonde. In reality, they are boys from the village who have been disguised by Lucas and Thibault. They make Colin promise to marry Ragonde in return for his life.

=== Act Three: La noce ou le charivari (The Wedding or the Charivari) ===
The double wedding of Colette and Lucas and Ragonde and Colin takes place. Colin is in tears until Ragonde threatens him with the goblins again. The opera ends with a charivari, noisy music to celebrate the married couples.

== Recordings ==
- Les amours de Ragonde (1742 version) Michel Verschaeve, Jean-Paul Fouchécourt, Sophie Marin-Degor, Les Musiciens du Louvre, conducted by Marc Minkowski (Erato, 1992)

== Sources ==
- Le magazine de l'opéra baroque by Jean-Claude Brenac
- Pitou, Spire, The Paris Opéra. An Encyclopedia of Operas, Ballets, Composers, and Performers – Rococo and Romantic, 1715-1815, Greenwood Press, Westport/London, 1985 (ISBN 0-313-24394-8)
- Booklet notes to the above recording.
- Period printed score: Les Amours de Ragonde ou la Soirée de village représentée par l'Académie royalle de musique, Amsterdam, le Cene, 1745 (accessible for free online at Gallica - B.N.F.)
