= François-Antoine Jolly =

French playwright and librettist (1662–1753)

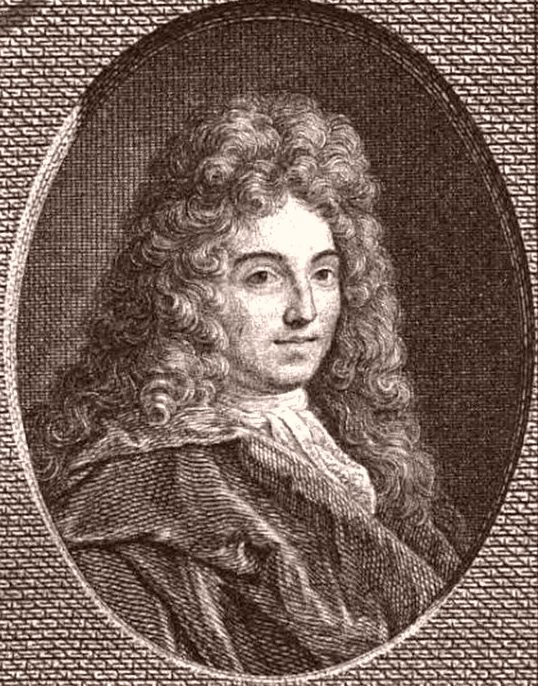
François-Antoine Jolly, portrait by Louis de Boullogne

François-Antoine Jolly (25 December 1662 in Paris – 30 July 1753) was an 18th-century French playwright and librettist.

Jolly became royal censor and initially composed several works for theater including the lyrics of the five-act opera Méléagre by Battistin given on 24 May 1709; l’École des Amants, comedy in three acts and in verse, successfully performed in 1718 and printed in 1719; la Capricieuse, comédy in three acts and in verse, presented at the Théâtre-Italien in 1726, published in 1727; and la Femme jalouse, comedy in three acts and in verse, given at the same theatre in 1726, printed in 1727.

He gave accurate editions of Œuvres by Molière, 1734, 6 vol. in-4°, and 1739, 8 vol. in-12, enhanced with vignettes for each play; Œuvres by Racine, 1 vol. in-12; Œuvres by P. Corneille, 5 vol. in-12; Théâtre by Montfleury father and son, 3 vol. in 12.

Finally, he wrote Nouveau et grand Cérémonial de France, a work which earned a pension of 400 pounds to the sisters of the author.

== Sources ==
- Ferdinand Hoefer, Nouvelle Biographie générale, t. 26, Paris, Firmin-Didot, 1858,(p. 584).
