= Pirithoüs (opera) =

Pirithoüs is an opera by the French composer Jean-Joseph Mouret, first performed at the Académie Royale de Musique (the Paris Opera) on 26 January 1723. It takes the form of a tragédie en musique in a prologue and five acts. The libretto is by Jean-Louis-Ignace de La Serre. The opera takes its name from the King Pirithous of Greek mythology.

The premiere was considered very successful, although Le Mercure said that the main scenes wasn't as interesting as hoped for, but overall the opera was lively, pleasureful, and brilliant.

== Sources ==
- (in French) Libretto at "Livrets baroques"
- Renée Viollier (1950). Jean-Joseph Mouret le musicien des grâces, 1682-1738 (in French). Floury.
