= Joseph de La Font =

French playwright

- Born: 1686
- Died: 20 March 1725 (aged 39)
- Occupation: Playwright

Joseph de La Font (sometimes spelled Lafont; born 1686, died 20 March 1725) was an 18th-century French playwright.

The son of a prosecutor at the parlement de Paris, La Font composed some twenty theatre plays, alone or in collaboration with Lesage and d'Orneval. He is best known for his 1714 opera-ballet Le triomphe ou les fêtes de Thalie, with music by Jean-Joseph Mouret.

He died at the early age of 39 as a result of his passion for wine.
