= Jean-Baptiste Stuck =

Jean-Baptiste Stuck (also known by the single moniker "Baptistin," "Batistin" or "Battistin") (6 May 1680 – 8 December 1755) was an Italian-French composer and cellist of the Baroque era.

Little is known of Stuck's early years. He was born at Livorno on the coast of Tuscany, came from a merchant family, and was the son of Giovanni-Giacomo Stuck and Barbera Hellerbeck. From 1702 he was in the service of Countess Lemos in Naples. Stuck wrote arias for the performance of the opera L'innocente inganno of Tomaso Albinoni, which was performed under the new title Rodrigo in Algieri on 10 December 1702 in Naples at the Teatro San Bartolimeo.

Shortly thereafter Stuck moved to Paris. In 1705, he published the collection Für das Jahr 1701 through the Ballard publishing house. In Paris, he was a member of the Chapelle royale and a cellist in the service of Philippe II, Duke of Orléans. In 1722, he led the cello in the opera orchestra, displacing the bass viol. In 1733 he was naturalized French. He died in Paris.

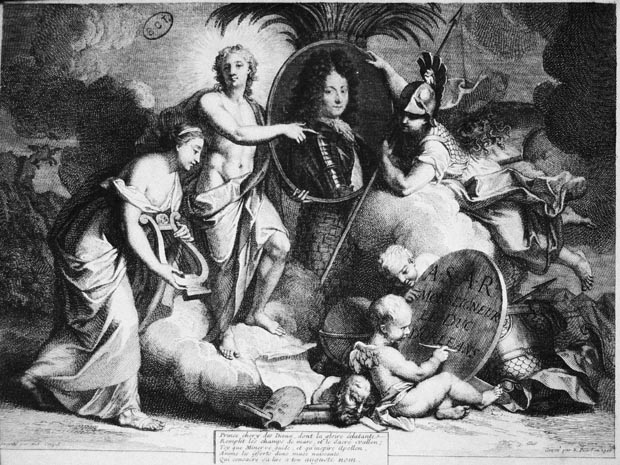
Frontispiece of the first edition of Stuck's cantatas.

== Works ==
=== Operas ===
He composed numerous operas, including:

- Méléagre (Paris, 1709) (Libretto by François-Antoine Jolly)
- Manto la fée (Paris, 1710) (Libretto by Mennesson)
- Il Gran Cid (Livorno, 1715, Naples 1717)
- Polydore (Paris, 1720 revived Paris, 1739)

=== Secular Cantatas ===
Stuck published four books of cantatas, the first three in 1706, 1708, 1711, (titled "Cantates Françoises") and a fourth in 1714 (titled "Cantates Françoises et Italienne"). In 1729, the Concert Spirituel performed another cantata Union de la musique française et italienne.

- Book 1 (1706): "Cantates Françoises à Voix Seule, avec Symphonies = French cantatas for solo voice, with symphonies" Containing: Philomèle. L'amant impatient. L'amant réconcilié. Contre l'ambition. Le Calme de la nuit. Céphale et Aurore.
- Book 2 (1708): "Cantates Françoises à Voix Seule et basse-Continue avec et sans Symphonies = French cantatas for solo voice and basso continuo with and without symphonies" Containing: Proserpine. Neptune et Amymone. La Naissance d'Achile. Ariane. Sur la prise de Lérida. Mars jaloux.
- Book 3 (1711): "Cantates Françoises à I. II. Voix et basse-Continue avec Symphonies = French cantatas for one and two voices and basso continuo with symphonies" Containing: Les Bains de Toméry. Héraclite et Démocrite. (Published by Ballard in Paris)
- Book 4 (1714): "Cantates Françoises et Italienne à I. II. Voix et basse-Continue avec Symphonies = French and Italian cantatas for one and two voices and basso continuo with symphonies" Containing: Flore. L'Amour vengé. Diane. Psiché. Les Festes bolonnoises. Cantata (In Italian).

Books 1 and 2 were included in the score library of the contemporary French operatic baritone Gabriel-Vincent Thévenard.

=== Recordings ===
Héraclite et Démocrite on "Baroque Cantatas at Versailles." With D'Anna Fortunato, mezzo-soprano; John Ostendorf, bass-baritone; Brewer Ensemble, on original instruments; Rudolph Palmer, conductor. SR-182 Spectrum. LP record. Re-issued as WVH 071 Erasmus. Compact Disc.

Héraclite et Démocrite on "French Cantatas." With Jennifer Smith, soprano; Thierry Félix, baritone; Les Musiciens du Louvre; Marc Minkowski, conductor. 471 730-2 Archiv. Compact Disc.

Héraclite et Démocrite on "Une Soirée chez le Chevalier Chavoye." With Cécile Larroche, soprano; Guillaume Figiel Delpech, counter-tenor; Les Chantres de Saint-Hilaire Sauternes; François-Xavier Lacroux, conductor. Hortus202, Éditions Hortus. Compact Disc, 2021.

Polydore With Hélène Guilmette, Judith van Wanroij, Tassis Christoyannis, Thomas Dolié, David Witczak, Chloé Briot; Orfeo Orchestra & Purcell Choir; György Vashegyi, conductor. Glossa. Compact Disc, 2023.

=== Modern Editions ===
Stuck, Jean-Batiste (Battistin). "Cantatas." Edited by David Tunley. In The Eighteenth Century French Cantata, Volume 4. New York: Garland Publishing, 1990.

This facsimile edition is part of a larger multi-volume monument set and contains all four books of Stuck's French and Italian cantatas. The additional commentary is extensive and contains instrumentation and movement description, librettist, plot synopses and performance history for each of the cantatas.

Stuck, Jean-Batiste (dit Battistin). "Héraclite et Démocrite: Cantate pour soprano et basse avec deux violons." In La Cantate Francaise au XVIIIe siècle, Volume 8. Geneva: Minkoff Reprint, 1984.

This facsimile edition of this single cantata is from a large multi-volume monument set, and is reproduced from Stuck's third Book of Cantatas, published by Ballard in Paris in 1711. The final page consists of a reproduction of a long legal paragraph, "Extrait du Privilege Du Roy," which discusses giving sole printing rights to the publisher Christopher Ballard, based on laws signed by Louis XIV.

Stuck, Jean-Baptiste. Héraclite et Démocrite: Cantata for soprano, bass, two violins and bass continuo. Edited by Conrad Lee. Richmond, England: Green Man Press, 2005.

Conrad Lee has edited this fully modern edition of the cantata, adding a foreword, the libretto in original French and English translation, and resetting the notation in modern type. The edition includes a full score as well as two violin parts, a continuo part and two vocal parts (with figured bass below). In the full score, the figured bass of the original is still included below the keyboard line, but has been realized in notation.
