= Joseph François Salomon =

French composer (1649–1732)

Joseph François Salomon (April 1649 – 5 March 1732) was a French composer of the Baroque era. Born in Toulon, Provence, he learnt to play the bass viol and harpsichord, and went to Paris to work as a musician for the royal family. He was 52 when he composed his first opera, the tragédie en musique Médée et Jason.

== Operas ==
- Médée et Jason (1713)
- Théonoé (1715)

== Sources ==
- Le magazine de l'opéra baroque by Jean-Claude Brenac (in French)
