= Manto la fée =

Manto la fée (Manto the Fairy) is an opera by the French-Italian composer Jean-Baptiste Stuck, first performed at the Académie Royale de Musique (the Paris Opera) on 29 January 1711. It takes the form of a tragédie en musique in a prologue and five acts. The libretto is by Mennesson.

== Sources ==
- (in French) Libretto at "Livrets baroques"
- (in French) Félix Clément and Pierre Larousse Dictionnaire des Opéras, Paris, 1881, page 428.
