= Alexandre de Villeneuve =

French composer

Alexandre de Villeneuve (25 May 1677, Hyères – 1756). was an 18th-century French classical composer.

== Life ==
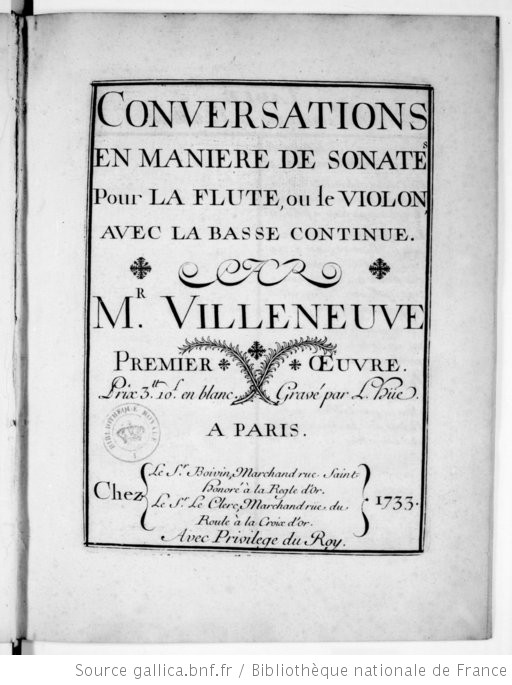

A priest in Hyères, he was received in 1697 as a chorister in Saint-Trophime d'Arles and became master of Music in 1701. He remained in this office until 1706 when he moved to Paris to take up the post of music master for the Jesuits of rue Saint-Jacques.

In 1719, he published a book of sacred music comprising nine Leçons de ténèbres dedicated to Madame d'Orléans : "The privilege, dated 1719, was granted to Sieur Alexandre de Villeneuve for “several motets with leçons de ténèbres, a Miserere, and other music, both vocal and instrumental”"

In 1742, he composed a Divertissement, dédié à son Excellence Saïd Mehemet, Pacha, which was performed in honor of the Turkish ambassador Yirmisekizzade Mehmed Said Pasha visiting Paris: "An entertainment that Sieur de Villeneuve had performed in 1742 before the Turkish ambassador was announced as consisting of a variety of short pieces, including an overture, a tempête, a chaconne, a French march, a Turkish march, “character” airs, passepieds, minuets, rigaudons, sung ariettas, duets, choruses, all “easy to perform and in good taste,” which could be played "by only five people, namely, a soprano and a basse-taille (low tenor), two violins and a harpsichord, or basso continuo on the viola or cello; and for large concerts, the vocal parts of the choirs, flutes, oboes, trumpets, and all the appropriate instruments will be added."

== Works (selection) ==
- ‘'Thétis’', cantata, (La Motte) performed on January 4, 1712.
- ‘'Exultate Deo adjutori nostro’', book of church music, 1719.
- ‘'Le Voyage de Cithère’', French cantata for one voice with symphony, 1727.
- ‘'Premier Concert Spirituel à I, II. III, IV voix with symphony, on a French translation of Psalm 96, Dominus regnavit exultet terra.’' Dedicated to the Queen by M. Villeneuve, former master of music of the metropolis of Arles. Sold in Paris by the author, 1727.
- ‘'La Princesse d'Elide’', heroic ballet, 1728.
- ‘'Epithalame’', 1728.
- ‘'Conversations en manière de sonates pour la flûte ou le violon avec la basse continue’' (Conversations in the manner of sonatas for flute or violin with basso continuo): first work, Paris, 1733.
- ‘'Conversations in the manner of sonatas for 2 flutes or 2 violins or 2 violas’': second work, Paris, 1733.
- Nouvelle méthode, très courte et très facile, avec un nombre de leçons assez suffisant pour apprendre la musique et les agréments du chant, par Mr Villeneuve (New method, very short and very easy, with a sufficient number of lessons to learn music and the embellishments of singing), by Mr. Villeneuve, 1756.

== Discography ==
- Sixième conversation en manière de sonate pour flûte et basse-continue recreated and recorded by the baroque ensemble Les Festes d'Orphée, CD Les Maîtres baroques de Provence, vol. I, 1996, Parnassie éditions.
- Miserere; Leçons de ténèbres; Conversations en manière de Sonates op. 2 recorded by Vedado, dir. Ronald Martin Alonso
