= Jean-Joseph Mouret =

French composer (1682–1738)

Jean-Joseph Mouret (11 April 1682 in Avignon, Papal States – 10 December 1738 in Charenton-le-Pont) was a French composer whose dramatic works made him one of the leading exponents of Baroque music in his country. Even though most of his works are rarely performed, Mouret's name survives today thanks to the popularity of the Fanfare-Rondeau from his first Suite de symphonies, which has been adopted as the signature tune of the PBS program Masterpiece and is a popular musical choice in many modern weddings.

== Life ==
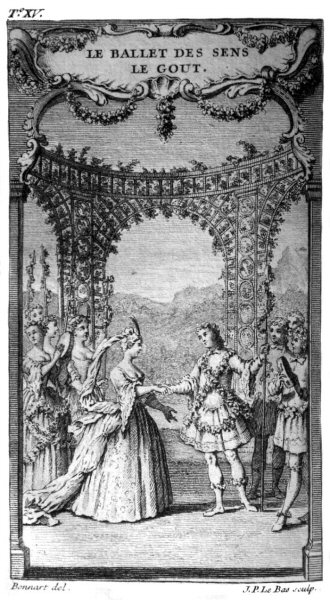
Erigone and Bacchus in Act 5 of Jean-Joseph Mouret's Le triomphe des sens

Jean-Joseph was the son of Jean Bertrand Mouret, a silk merchant, who gave his son a good education and, noting his early gifts for music, supported his musical studies. Mouret sang and composed with success and, around the age of twenty-five, settled in Paris. Talented and agreeable, he became well-known there, and in 1708 he was introduced to Anne, Duchess of Maine, whose salon at Sceaux was a center of courtly society in the declining years of the reign of Louis XIV. He was able to secure the Duchess's patronage, and she made him her Surintendant de la musique at Sceaux shortly thereafter. At Sceaux Mouret produced operas and was in charge of the sixteen bi-weekly Grandes nuits in the season of 1714–15. In this capacity, he produced intermèdes and allegorical cantatas in the court masque tradition, and other music, in the company of the most favoured musicians, for the most select audience in France.

Mouret's opéra-ballet Les fêtes, ou Le triomphe de Thalie ["Festivities, or The Triumph of Thalia"] with a libretto by Joseph de La Font was presented at the Opéra on 19 August 1714. In the prologue, in a scenic design representing the stage of the Opéra, Thalia, the muse of Comedy, triumphs over Melpomene, the muse of Tragedy. This dramatic conceit resulted in a succès de scandale, obliging La Font to immediately prepare a nouvelle entrée ["new entry/act"] entitled La critique des fêtes de Thalie (presented on 9 October 1714). In the 1720 edition the title was changed to Les fêtes de Thalie, and in 1722 another nouvelle entrée ["new entry/act"] was added, La provençale, which featured regional costumes, instruments, and well-known melodies sung in the Provençal dialect. This new act proved to be very popular, and continued to be performed as a standalone fragment up until the late 1770's.

In 1714, Mouret also received an appointment as the director of the orchestra of the Opéra, a post which he held until 1718. From 1717 to 1737 he directed the Nouveau Théâtre Italien for which he composed divertissements that accompanied, for example, the tender comedies of Marivaux, and which, printed, fill six volumes. At court Mouret maintained a post as singer, and directed the grand divertissements offered by the Regent, the duc d'Orléans at his château of Villers-Cotterêts on the occasion of Louis XV's coming-of-age in 1722. Concurrently, he was director of the concert series established by the orchestra of the Opéra, the Concert Spirituel (1728–1734), positions which provided a public outlet for his own music and which permitted him to live in affluence.

Mouret married Madeleine Prompt de Saint-Marc in Versailles on October 23, 1711, and had one daughter, Françoise Louise, born in Paris on October 21, 1722. However, his later years were overshadowed by financial and social disappointments. Sinking into poverty, Mouret was committed to the insane asylum at Charenton on 14 April 1738 and died there on 10 December. The location of his grave is unknown.

== Works ==
Mouret composed mainly for the stage. He contributed to the emergence of the distinctively French genres of lyric tragedy and opera-ballet but his jealousy of the rising star of Jean-Philippe Rameau led to the bitterness and madness in which he ended his days:

- Les fêtes de Thalie, Joseph de La Font's opera-ballet for the Paris Opéra, (1714)
- Le mariage de Ragonde et de Colin for Sceaux, (1714) (1742 version: Les amours de Ragonde)
- Ariane (1717)
- Pirithoüs Paris Opéra, (1723)
- Les amours des dieux Paris Opéra, (1727)
- Le triomphe des sens (1732)
- Les grâces héroïques (1733)
- Le temple de Gnide Paris Opéra (1741).

Mouret also wrote airs, divertissements, cantatilles, motets, and instrumental works (sonatas, fanfares). Among his other compositions, the two Suites de symphonies (1729) deserve special mention. The first suite, renowned for the arrangement of its opening rondeau which serves as the Masterpiece Theatre theme, is entitled "Fanfare for trumpets, timpani, violins, and oboes" and dedicated to the son of the Duchess of Maine, the Prince of Dombes. The Concert Spirituel, conducted by Mouret himself, gave the premiere performance of this suite. The second suite, scored for violins, oboes, and horns, was first played at the Hôtel de Ville before King Louis XV.

== Sources ==
- Anthony, James R. (2001). "Mouret, Jean-Joseph". In Sadie, Stanley; Tyrrell, John (eds.). The New Grove Dictionary of Music and Musicians (2nd ed.). London: Macmillan Publishers. ISBN 978-1-56159-239-5.
