= Simon-Joseph Pellegrin =

French writer

The abbé Simon-Joseph Pellegrin (1663 – 5 September 1745) was a French poet and playwright, a librettist who collaborated with Jean-Philippe Rameau and other composers.

== Biography ==
He was born at Marseille, Province of Provence, the son of a conseiller to the Siège Présidial of the city. He was at first designated for an ecclesiastical career, from which he retained the courtesy title abbé. Though he was for a time a novice of the Servites at Moustiers-Sainte-Marie, he soon embarked on a career as a ship's bursar. Returning to France in 1703, he settled in Paris and composed his earliest poems, among them an Epître à Louis XIV, praising the Sun King's military successes, which gained the king's attention and the Académie française prize in 1704.

Probably thanks to Madame de Maintenon, Pellegrin succeeded in escaping the urging of his superiors that he become more fully integrated with his order; instead a papal dispensation enabled him to enter the Cluniac order, whereupon he was at the service of various schools, such as Saint-Cyr, for which he provided numerous pious cantiques spirituelles, in which he translated psalms and canticles and set them to familiar tunes from the opera, at the same time that his services were retained for the theatres and the opera, which permitted an otherwise unknown poet Rémi the epigram:

Catholic in the morning and idolater in the evening, he dined from the altar and supped from the theatre

Antoine de Léris esteemed him "an excellent grammarian and a most fecund author, to which he joined great goodness of heart and a grand simplicity of manner. Out of respect for his character as an abbé, he published most of his dramatic works under the name of his brother Jacques Pellegrin, styled the Chevalier Pellegrin".

From 1705 onward he wrote four tragedies with Greek and Roman settings, Polydore, La Mort d'Ulisse, Pelopée and Catilina, and six comedies, with modern aristocratic settings, Le Pere intéressé, ou la Fausse inconstance, Le Nouveau monde, Le Divorce de l'Amour et de la Raison, Le Pastor fido, L'Inconstant and L'Ecole de l'hymen.

At least seven of his libretti were set to music and presented at the Opéra: Télémaque with music by André Cardinal Destouches (20 November 1714), Renaud, ou la suite d'Armide with music by Henri Desmarest, (5 March 1722), Télégone with music by a certain La Coste, Orion (in collaboration, music by La Coste), La Princesse d'Elide, Jephté with music by Michel Pignolet de Montéclair (1732), and Hippolyte et Aricie with music by Jean-Philippe Rameau (1 October 1733), Rameau's first opera. The theatre anecdote would have the seasoned Pellegrin, who had demanded 500 livres for his poem, regardless of the work's success, tear up the promissory note on hearing the young Rameau's music, arguing that such a genius did not require such a stringent guarantee.

Pellegrin collaborated on at least one ballet-opera with the dramatist Marie-Anne Barbier, co-writing the libretto for Les Plaisirs de la campagne (1719)

Pellegrin died in Paris in 1745.

== Works ==
- 1704: Télémaque & Calypso, tragedy by Destouches
- 1705: Renaud ou la Suite d'Armide, tragedy by Desmarest
- 1707: "La Mort d'Ulisse, tragédie" publiée chez Pierre Ribou, Paris, selon Privilège du Roy du 17 décembre 1705 cédé à Pierre Ribou et approbation de Fontenelle du 17 décembre 1706 (in-12 de 1 f. de titre, 1 f. non chiffré recto-verso de catalogue du libraire, 2 ff. non chiffrés de privilège du Roy avec la liste des acteurs au verso du 2e feuillet, 71 pp. de texte, approbation de Fontenelle au verso non chiffré de la p. 71)
- 1708 and 1711: Collections of French carols, including his text for the popular Advent hymn "Venez, divin Messie" (O come, divine Messiah)
- 1713: Histoire de l’Ancien et du Nouveau Testament, avec le fruit qu’on en doit tirer, le tout mis en cantiques. 2e éd. (suivie de) Airs notez pour l’histoire de l’Ancien et du Nouveau Testament, Paris, Le Clerc.
- 1713: Médée & Jason, tragedy by Joseph François Salomon (1649-1732)
- 1719: Les Plaisirs de la campagne, opéra-ballet by Toussaint Bertin de La Doué (v.1680-1743)
- 1722: Noël nouveaux sur les chants des Noëls anciens et chansons spirituelles pour tout le cours de l’année. Sur les airs d’opéra et vaudevilles très-connus notez pour en faciliter le chant. Nouv. éd. Paris, Le Clerc.
- 1724: Polydore, tragedy by Stuck et La Serre
- 1725: Télégone, tragedy by Louis de Lacoste (v. 1675 - v. 1753)
- 1728: La Princesse d'Élide, ballet héroïque by Alexandre de Villeneuve
- 1729: Les Présents des dieux, in the ballet héroïque Le Parnasse by Collin de Blamont
- 1732: Jephté, tragedy by Montéclair
- 1733: Hippolyte & Aricie, tragedy by Rameau
- 1739: Les Fêtes d'Hébé, opéra-ballet by Rameau, in collaboration with Gautier de Mondorge, La Pouplinière et Bernard.
- 1752: Prologue for Alphée et Aréthuse by Montéclair for the opera Aréthuse by Campra.

In addition to some librettos for opera (Antigone, Ariane, Loth, Orion), Léris suggests also several other tragedies : La Mort d'Ulysse, Pélopée, Catilina; six comédies : Le Père intéressé ou la Fausse inconstance, Le Nouveau monde, Le Divorce de l'Amour & de la Raison, Le Pastor fido, L'Inconstant, L'École de l'hymen.
