= List of French haute-contre roles =

The following list includes most of the roles which were created by the leading French hautes-contre of the 17th and 18th centuries, or at least those to be found in operas by the major composers of the same period. The table was compiled by collating data from the sources listed at the bottom of the page, either printed or online, and makes no pretence at being exhaustive. Rather, its purpose is to provide an outline of a significant period in French operatic singing: it extends chronologically from Bernard Clédière to Joseph Legros.

| Role | Title | Genre | Author | First performer | Theatre | Première date |
|---|---|---|---|---|---|---|
| Juturne, Dieu des jardins ("god of gardens") | Pomone | opéra or play set to music (or pastorale) | Robert Cambert | Bernard Clédière, Pierre Taulet (or Tholet) | Salle du Bel-Air (rue de Vaugirard) | 3 March 1671 |
| Apollon, Pan | Les peines et les plaisirs de l'amour | pastorale héroïque in lyric verse | Cambert | Clédière, Taulet | Salle du Bel-Air (rue de Vaugirard) | February/March 1672 |
| L'Envie ("Envy")/first Tyrian prince/the wet nurse, second Tyrian prince | Cadmus et Hermione | tragédie en musique | Jean-Baptiste Lully | Clédière, Gingan "cadet" | Salle du Bel-Air (rue de Vaugirard) | 27 April 1673 |
| Admète, Apollon/Alecton | Alceste, ou Le triomphe d'Alcide | tragédie en musique | Lully | Clédière, Le Roy | Palais-Royal | 19 January 1674 |
| Thésée, Bacchus, old man | Thésée | tragédie en musique | Lully | Clédière, de La Grille, Tholet | Saint-Germain-en-Laye | 11 January 1675 |
| Atys, Zephyr, le Sommeil ("Sleep") | Atys | tragédie en musique | Lully | Clédière, de La Grille, Ribon | Palais-Royal | August 1675 |
| Mercure, Apollon, a Fury | Isis | tragédie en musique | Lully | Clédière, de La Grille, Ribon | Saint-Germain-en-Laye | 5 January 1677 |
| Vertumne, Amour, Mercure, Vulcain, Zephire, Apollon, Mars, a Fury | Psyché | tragédie en musique | Lully | (unknown) | Palais-Royal | 18 April 1678 |
| Bellérophon, Bacchus/the Pythia | Bellérophon | tragédie en musique | Lully | Clédière, Le Roy | Palais-Royal | 31 January 1679 |
| Alphée, la Discorde ("Discord") | Proserpine | tragédie en musique | Lully | Clédière, Puvigné | Saint-Germain-en-Laye | 3 February 1680 |
| Persée | Persée | tragédie en musique | Lully | Louis Gaulard Dumesny | Palais-Royal | 17 April 1682 |
| Le Jeu ("Gambling") | Les plaisirs de Versailles | divertissement | Marc-Antoine Charpentier | Marc-Antoine; Charpentier (?) | Versailles | 1682 |
| Phaëton | Phaëton | tragédie en musique | Lully | Dumesny | Versailles | 6 January 1683 |
| Actéon | Actéon | pastorale | Charpentier | Charpentier (?) | Hôtel de Guise | 1683 |
| Amadis | Amadis | tragédie en musique | Lully | Dumesny | Palais-Royal | 15 January 1684 |
| Médor | Roland | tragédie en musique | Lully | Dumesny | Versailles | 8 January 1685 |
| La Peinture ("Painting") | Les arts florissants | opéra de chambre | Charpentier | Charpentier | Collège Louis-le-Grand | 6 August 1685 |
| Florestan | La couronne de fleurs | pastorale | Charpentier | Charpentier | (inconnu) | 1685 (?) |
| Renaud, the Danish knight, a fortunate lover | Armide | tragédie en musique | Lully | Dumesny, (other performers unknown) | Palais-Royal | 15 February 1686 |
| Acis | Acis et Galatée | pastorale héroïque | Lully | Dumesny | Château d'Anet | 6 September 1686 |
| Orphée, Ixion | La descente d'Orphée aux enfers | opéra de chambre | Charpentier | François Anthoine, Charpentier | (uncertain) | 1686 |
| Achille | Achille et Polyxène | tragédie en musique | Lully et Pascal Collasse | Dumesny | Palais-Royal | 7 November 1687 |
| David, the Witch of Endor | David et Jonathas | tragédie biblique | Charpentier | (uncertain) | Collège Louis-le-Grand | 28 February 1688 |
| Pélée | Thétis et Pélée | tragédie en musique | Collasse | Dumesny | Palais-Royal | 11 January 1689 |
| Énée | Énée et Lavinie | tragédie en musique | Collasse | Dumesny | Palais-Royal | 7 November 1690 |
| Myrtil | Le ballet de Villeneuve Saint-Georges | opéra-ballet | Collasse | Dumesny | Villeneuve-Saint-Georges (at the Dauphin's) | 1 September 1692 |
| Eneé | Didon | tragédie lyrique | Henry Desmarets | Dumesny | Palais-Royal | 5 June 1693 |
| Jason | Médée | tragédie mise en musique | Charpentier | Dumesny | Palais-Royal | 4 December 1693 |
| Le Printemps ("Spring"), Zéphyre/Aquilon, l'Été ("Summer") | Le ballet des saisons or Les saisons | opéra-ballet | Collasse and Louis Lully | Renaud, Pierre Chopelet, Jean Boutelou | Palais-Royal | 18 October 1695 |
| Bacchus | Ariane et Bacchus | tragédie lyrique | Marin Marais | Dumesny | Palais-Royal | 8 March 1696 |
| Apollon (Philémon), le Sommeil ("Sleep")/a shepherd/oracle | Issé | pastorale héroïque | André Cardinal Destouches | Dumesny, J. Boutelou | Fontainebleau | 7 October 1697 |
| Octavio, Philène, Don Pédro | L'Europe galante | opéra-ballet | André Campra | Dumesny, J. Boutelou, Pierre Chopelet | Palais-Royal | 24 October 1697 |
| Amadis | Amadis de Grèce | tragédie lyrique | Destouches | Dumesny | Palais-Royal | 26 March 1699 |
| Télamon, un Plaisir ("a Pleasure") | Hésione | tragédie en musique | Campra | Chopelet, J. Boutelou | Palais-Royal | 21 December 1700 |
| Apollon/Dardanus, a magician/un Plaisir ("a Pleasure")/a shepherd | Scylla | tragédie lyrique | Theobaldo di Gatti | Chopelet, J. Boutelou | Palais-Royal | 16 September 1701 |
| Cariselli | Cariselli | divertissement comique | Robert Cambert | J. Boutelou | Palais-Royal | 1702/1703 |
| An enchanter/a warrior, a sylvan | Tancrède | opéra | Campra | Jacques Cochereau, J. Boutelou | Palais Royal | 7 November 1702 |
| Plutus, Mercure/the professor of folly | Le carnaval et la folie | comédie-ballet (comédie en musique) | Destouches | Cochereau, J. Boutelou | Fontainebleau | 17 October 1703 |
| Apollon/Aristippe, Palémon/Eraste, | Les muses | opéra-ballet | Campra | Chopelet, Cochereau | Palais-Royal | 28 October 1703 |
| Pylade, Triton | Iphigénie en Tauride | tragédie en musique | Desmarest et Campra | Poussin, Chopelet | Palais-Royal | 6 May 1704 |
| Octave, un Plaisir ("a Pleasure")/a boatman, a masker | La Vénitienne | ballet (comédie lyrique) | Michel de La Barre | Chopelet, J. Boutelou, Cochereau | Palais-Royal | 26 May 1705 |
| Athamas, a shepherd/Arcas, a genius | Philomèle | tragédie lyrique | Louis Lacoste | Cochereau, Chopelet, J. Boutelou | Palais-Royal | 20 October 1705 |
| Apollon, Ceix, le Sommeil ("Sleep"), Phosphore, a follower of Ceix | Alcyone | tragédie lyrique | Marais | Cochereau, Marin Boutelou, Chopelet, Robert Lebel, J. Boutelou | Palais Royal | 16 February 1706 |
| Apollon, Oreste, Arcas, the Simoeis | Cassandre | tragédie lyrique | François Bouvard and Thomas Toussaint Bertin de La Doué | Thomas-Louis Bourgeois, Cochereau, M. Boutelou, Chopelet | Palais-Royal | 22 June 1706 |
| Mercure, Ulixes, a hunter | Polyxène et Pyrrhus | tragédie lyrique | Collasse | Chopelet, M. Boutelou, J. Boutelou | Palais-Royal | 22 June 1706 |
| a Marsigliese, a Marsigliese, a warrior | Bradamante | tragédie lyrique | Lacoste | Cochereau, M. Boutelou, Bourgeois | Palais-Royal | 2 May 1707 |
| Triton/a shepherd, the high priest | Hippodamie | tragédie lyrique | Campra | Cochereau, Chopelet | Palais-Royal | 6 March 1708 |
| Adraste, Apollon | Sémélé | tragédie lyrique | Marais | Cochereau, Beaufort | Palais-Royal | 9 April 1709 |
| Daunus, Zéphyre | Diomède | tragédie lyrique | Bertin de La Doué | Cochereau, Chopelet | Palais-Royal | 28 April 1710 |
| Damiro/Eraste, A follower of Fortune | Les fêtes vénitiennes | opéra-ballet | Campra | Cochereau, Buseau | Palais-Royal | 17 June 1710 |
| Idamante, Arbas | Idoménée | tragédie en musique | Campra | Cochereau, Buseau | Palais-Royal | 12 January 1712 |
| Idas, the Pythia | Créuse l'athénienne | tragédie lyrique | Lacoste | Cochereau, Chopelet | Palais-Royal | 5 April 1712 |
| Agenor | Callirhoé | tragédie-opéra | Destouches | Cochereau | Palais-Royal | 27 December 1712 |
| Jason, a sailor | Médée et Jason | tragédie lyrique | François Joseph Salomon | Cochereau, Chopelet | Palais-Royal | 24 April 1713 |
| Pâris | Les amours déguisés | ballet lyrique (ballet héroïque) | Thomas-Louis Bourgeois | Cochereau | Palais-Royal | 22 August 1713 |
| Arsame, a priest of Hercules | Télèphe | tragédie lyrique | Campra | Cochereau, Chopelet | Palais-Royal | 28 November 1713 |
| Léandre | Les fêtes de Thalie | opéra-ballet | Jean-Joseph Mouret | Cochereau | Palais-Royal | 19 August 1714 |
| Télémaque, Arcas, Un Art ("an Art")/a demon turned into a pleasure | Télémaque | tragédie lyrique | Destouches | Cochereau, Buseau, Bourgeois | Palais-Royal | 29 November 1714 |
| Un Plaisir ("a Pleasure")/ Licidas, Timante, Bacchus/Lisis, Momus, a drunkard | Les plaisirs de la paix | opéra-ballet | Bourgeois | Thomas-Louis Bourgeois, Cochereau, Buseau, Lebel, Louis Murayre | Palais-Royal | 29 April 1715 |
| Leucippe, a man from Poitou/a warrior | Théonoé | tragédie lyrique | Salomon | Cochereau, Murayre | Palais-Royal | 3 December 1715 |
| Corèbe, Arbas | Ajax | tragédie lyrique | Bertin de la Doué | Cochereau, Murayre | Palais-Royal | 20 April 1716 |
| Lisis | Les festes de l'été | opéra-ballet | Michel Pignolet de Montéclair | Murayre | Palais-Royal | 12 June 1716 |
| Lyncée, an Egyptian/a shepherd/second coryphaeus | Hypermnestre | tragédie en musique | Charles-Hubert Gervais | Cochereau, Murayre | Palais-Royal | 3 November 1716 |
| Cérite, Zephire/a Volscian man | Camille, reine des Volsques | tragédie en musique | Campra | Cochereau, Murayre | Palais-Royal | 9 November 1717 |
| A shepherd, second Plaisir ("Pleasure")/a follower of la Folie ("Folly") | Ballet de la Jeunesse | ballet | Jean-Baptiste Matho e Alarius (Hilaire Verloge, ca 1684–1734) | Antoine Boutelou, Muraire | Palais des Tuileries | February 1718 |
| Léandre/Merlin, Artémise/Damon/an actor | Les âges | opéra-ballet | Campra | Cochereau, Murayre | Palais-Royal | 9 October 1718 |
| Arsane, a Babylonian/a genius | Sémiramis | tragédie lyrique | Destouches | Cochereau, Murayre | Palais-Royal | 4 December 1718 |
| Triton | Les amours de Protée | opéra-ballet | Gervais | Murayre | Palais-Royal | 23 May 1720 |
| le Plaisir ("Pleasure")/a singer, le Chagrin ("Affliction"), in the shape of la Raison ("Reason")/a singer/a shepherd, | Les folies de Cardénio | ballet for a heroicomic drama (ballet héroïque) | Michel-Richard Delalande | A. Boutelou, Muraire | Palais des Tuileries | 29 (or 20) December 1720 |
| Arion/Vertumne, Mercure | Les élémens | opéra-ballet | Destouches et de Lalande | A. Boutelou, Murayre | Palais des Tuileries | 31 December 1721 |
| Renaud, Arcas | Renaud (or La suite d'Armide) | tragédie lyrique | Desmarets | Denis-François Tribou, Grenet | Palais Royal | 5 March 1722 |
| Pirithoüs, la Discorde ("Discord") | Pirithoüs | tragédie lyrique | Mouret | Murayre, Tribou | Palais-Royal | 26 January 1723 |
| Tibulle, Éros, Amintas | Les fêtes grecques et romaines | ballet héroïque | François Collin de Blamont | Murayre, Grenet, Tribou | Palais-Royal | 13 July 1723 |
| Ali, the Euphrates | La reine des péris | comédie persane | Jacques Aubert | Murayre, Tribou | Palais-Royal | 10 April 1725 |
| Télémaque, the High Priest of Minerva | Télégone | tragédie-opéra | Lacoste | Murayre, Tribou | Palais-Royal | 6 November 1725 |
| Iphis/Lycas/slave and king of plays, Timante | Les stratagèmes de l'amour | opéra-ballet | Destouches | Murayre, Tribou | Palais-Royal | 21 March 1726 |
| Ninus | Pirame et Thisbé | tragédie lyrique | François Francœur et François Rebel | Murayre | Palais-Royal | 17 October 1726 |
| Apollon/a faun | Les amours des dieux | opéra-ballet | Mouret | Tribou | Palais-Royal | 14 September 1727 |
| Orion | Orion | tragédie lyrique | Lacoste | Tribou | Palais-Royal | 17 February 1728 |
| Tersandre | La princesse d'Élide | ballet héroïque | Alexandre de Villeneuve | Tribou | Palais-Royal | 20 July 1728 |
| Tarsis | Tarsis et Zélie | tragédie lyrique | Francœur and Rebel | Tribou | Palais-Royal | 19 October 1728 |
| Adonis/Linus | Les amours des déesses | ballet héroïque | Jean-Baptiste-Maurice Quinault | Tribou | Palais-Royal | 9 August 1729 |
| Acamas | Pyrrhus | tragédie lyrique | Joseph Nicolas Pancrace Royer | Tribou | Palais-Royal | 26 October 1730 |
| Nèrine | Le jaloux trompé | entrée de ballet | Campra | Tribou | Palais Royal | 18 January 1731 |
| Endymion | Endymion | pastorale héroïque | de Blamont | Tribou | Palais-Royal | 17 May 1731 |
| Ammon | Jephté | opéra sacré | Montéclair | Tribou | Palais-Royal | 28 February 1732 |
| Le Soleil ("Sun")/Protésilas | Le triomphe des sens (or Ballet des sens) | opéra-ballet | Mouret | Tribou | Palais-Royal | 5 June 1732 |
| Iphis | Biblis (or Byblis) | tragédie lyrique | Lacoste | Tribou | Palais-Royal | 6 November 1732 |
| L'Amour ("Cupid") | L'empire de l'amour | ballet héroïque | René de Galard de Béarn de Brassac | Tribou | Palai-Royal | 14 April 1733 |
| Hippolyte, l'Amour ("Cupid")/second Fate | Hippolyte et Aricie | tragédie en musique | Jean-Philippe Rameau | Tribou, Pierre de Jélyotte | Palais-Royal | 1 October 1733 |
| Périandre | La fête de Diane | entrée (de ballet) | Colin de Blamont | Jéliotte | Palais-Royal | 9 February 1734 |
| Damon, Zéphyre | Les fêtes nouvelles | ballet (ballet héroïque) | Duplessis called "le Cadet" (first name unknown) | Tribou, Jélyotte | Palais-Royal | 22 July 1734 |
| Ulysse, a shepherd/an Italian shepherd/Mercure | Achille et Déidamie | tragédie en musique | Campra | Tribou, Jéliotte | Palais-Royal | 24 February 1735 |
| Smindiride, Léonce | Les grâces | pastorale héroïque | Mouret | Tribou, Jélyotte | Palais-Royal | 5 May 1735 |
| Valère/Don Carlos, Tacmas | Les Indes galantes | opéra-ballet | Rameau | Jélyotte, Tribou | Palais-Royal | 23 August 1735 |
| Scanderberg, the mufti/La Magie ("Magia")/the Janissary agha | Scanderberg | tragédie (tragédie en musique) | Francœur and Rebel | Tribou, Jélyotte | Palais-Royal | 27 October 1735 |
| Damon | Les sauvages | entrée | Rameau | Jélyotte | Palais-Royal | 10 March 1736 |
| L'Amour ("Cupid") | Les voyages de l'Amour | opéra-ballet | Joseph Bodin de Boismortier | Jélyotte | Palais-Royal | 6 April 1736 |
| Iphis/Léon/Lindor, un genius/un opera genius | Les romans | ballet (ballet héroïque) | Jean-Baptiste Niel | Tribou, Jélyotte | Palais-Royal | 23 August 1736 |
| Léandre/a sylph | Les génies | opéra-ballet | Mlle Duval | Tribou | Palais-Royal | 18 October 1736 |
| Hylas, Orphée, a follower of Églé | Le triomphe de l'harmonie | ballet (ballet héroïque) | François-Lupien Grenet | Tribou, Jélyotte | Palais-Royal | 9 May 1737 |
| Castor, an athlete | Castor et Pollux | tragédie lyrique | Rameau | Tribou, Jean-Antoine Bérard | Palais-Royal | 24 October 1737 |
| Iphis/Mercure, Apollon/Philémon | Le ballet de la paix | opéra-ballet | Francœur and Rebel | Tribou, Jélyotte | Palais-Royal | 29 May 1738 |
| Thélème/ Mercure, Momus/Lycurgue | Les fêtes d'Hébé | opéra-ballet | Rameau | Jélyotte, Bérard | Palais-Royal | 21 May 1739 |
| Almanzor, Octave | Zaïde, reine de Grenade | ballet héroïque | Joseph-Nicolas-Pancrace Royer | Tribou, Jélyotte | Palais-Royal | 3 September 1739 |
| Dardanus, second Dream | Dardanus | tragédie lyrique | Rameau | Jélyotte, Bérard | Palais-Royal | 19 November 1739 |
| Cambise, a sailor/another person of the feast/ Salamandre | Nitétis | tragédie lyrique | Charles-Louis Mion | Jélyotte, Bérard | Palais-Royal | 17 April 1741 |
| Colin, Thibault | Les amours de Ragonde | comédie lyrique | Mouret | Jélyotte, Bérard | Palais Royal | 30 January 1742 |
| Alcidon | Isbé | pastorale héroïque | Jean-Joseph Cassanéa de Mondonville | Jélyotte | Palais Royal | 10 April 1742 |
| Don Quichotte | Don Quichotte chez la duchesse | ballet comique (comédie lyrique) | Boismortier | Bérard | Palais-Royal | 12 February 1743 |
| Émire/Le Dieu du Jour ("the god of the Day") | Le pouvoir de l'amour | ballet héroïque | Royer | Jélyotte | Palais-Royal | 23 April 1743 |
| Licas/Iphis/Agénor | Les caractères de la folie | opéra-ballet | Bernard de Bury | Jélyotte | Palais-Royal | 20 August 1743 |
| Valère/Léandre | L'école des amants | opéra-ballet | Niel | Jélyotte | Palais-Royal | 11 June 1744 |
| First priest | Les Augustales | prologue for a revival of Lully's "Acis et Galatée" | Francœur and Rebel | Jélyotte | Palais-Royal | 15 November 1744 |
| First and second voice, an astrologer | La princesse de Navarre | comédie-ballet | Rameau | Jélyotte, François Poirier, Jean-Paul Spesoller (called La Tour or Latour) | Versailles | 23 February 1745 |
| Zélindor, the genius of France | Zélindor, roi de sylphes | acte de ballet | Francœur and Rebel | Jélyotte, Poirier | Versailles | 17 March 1745 |
| Platée, Thespis, Mercure | Platée | comédie-lyrique (or 'ballet bouffon') | Rameau | Jélyotte, La Tour, Bérard | Versailles | 31 March 1745 |
| Alcide/Antiochus, a chief of arts | Les fêtes de Polymnie | ballet héroïque | Rameau | Jéliotte, La Tour | Palais-Royal | 12 October 1745 |
| Apollon/Trajan, Bacchus/a vanquished king, a shepherd/another vanquished king | Le temple de la gloire | opéra-ballet | Rameau | Jéliotte, Poirier, La Tour | Versailles | 27 November 1745 |
| Apollon/a minister of Destiny, shepherd Daphnis/Morphée/a shepherd/a Pleasure, Jupiter | Jupiter vainqueur des Titans | tragédie en musique | Colin de Blamond/Bury | La Tour, Poirier, Jéliotte | Versailles | 11 December 1745 |
| Glaucus, a shepherd | Scylla et Glaucus | tragédie en musique | Jean-Marie Leclair | Jélyotte, La Tour | Palais-Royal | 4 October 1746 |
| Zéphire/Bacchus, Momus/The Coryphaeus | L'année galante | ballet héroïque | Mion | Jéliotte, Poirier | Versailles | 13 February 1747 |
| Osiris/Aruéris, Ageris, un Plaisir ("a Pleasure")/Egyptian shepherd, | Les fêtes de l'Hymen et de l'Amour | opéra-ballet | Rameau | Jéliotte, La Tour, Poirier | Versailles | 15 March 1747 |
| Daphnis, un Plaisir ("a Pleasure")/a pastor | Daphnis et Chloé | pastorale | Boismortier | Jéliotte, La Tour | Palais-Royal | 28 September 1747 |
| Zaïs, a sylph | Zaïs | pastorale héroïque | Rameau | Jélyotte, Poirier | Palais-Royal | 29 February 1748 |
| Pygmalion | Pygmalion | acte de ballet | Rameau | Jéliotte | Palais-Royal | 27 August 1748 |
| Neptune, Neptune (prologue), Astérion | Naïs | pastorale héroïque | Rameau | Jéliotte, La Tour, Poirier | Palais-Royal | 22 April 1749 |
| A shepherd/Apollon, a follower of Euterpe | Le carnaval du Parnasse | ballet héroïque | Mondonville | Jéliotte, La Tour | Palais-Royal | 23 September 1749 |
| Zoroastre, Abenis/Orosmade/first Fury, third Fury/a voice from the clouds | Zoroastre | tragédie en musique | Rameau | Jéliotte, Poirier, La Tour | Palais-Royal | 5 December 1749 |
| Léandre | Léandre et Héro | tragédie lyrique | René de Galard de Béarn de Brassac | Jéliotte | Palais Royal | 5 May 1750 |
| Titon | Titon et l'Aurore | acte de ballet | de Bury | Jéliotte | Palais Royal | 18 February 1751 |
| Myrtil | La guirlande | acte de ballet | Rameau | Jéliotte | Palais-Royal | 21 September 1751 |
| The genius of America | Les génies tutélaires | acte de ballet | Francœur and Rebel | Jéliotte | Palais-Royal | 21 September 1751 |
| Acanthe, a coryphaeus, a shepherd | Acante et Céphise | pastorale héroïque | Rameau | Jéliotte, Poirier, La Tour | Palais-Royal | 19 November 1751 |
| Colin | Le devin du village | opéra pastoral (or intermède) | Jean-Jacques Rousseau | Jéliotte | Fontainebleau | 18 October 1752, |
| Daphnis /Bacchus, the grand priest of Hymen | Les amours de Tempé | ballet héroïque | Antoine Dauvergne | Jéliotte, Poirier | Palais Royal | 7 November 1752 |
| Titon, a shepherd | Titon et l'Aurore | pastorale héroïque | Mondonville | Jéliotte, Poirier | Palais-Royal | 9 January 1753 |
| Agis | Sibaris | acte de ballet | Rameau | Poirier | Fontainebleau | 13 November 1753 |
| Damon | La sibille | acte de ballet | Dauvergne | Jéliotte | Fontainebleau | 13 November 1753 |
| Daphnis | Daphnis et Églé | pastorale héroïque | Rameau | Jéliotte | Fontainebleau | 29 (or 30) November 1753 |
| Batyle (ou Bathylle) | Anacréon | acte de ballet héroïque | Rameau | Jéliotte | Fontainebleau | 23 October 1754 |
| Daphnis, Jeanet | Daphnis et Alcimadure | pastorale | Mondonville | Jélyotte, La Tour | Fontainebleau | 29 October 1754 |
| Iphis | Iphis et Célime (or Célime) | acte de ballet | M. le chevalier d'Herbain | Poirier | Palais-Royal | 28 September 1756 |
| Linus/Mercure/Agathocle, Euricles | Les surprises de l'Amour | opéra-ballet | Rameau | Poirier, Muguet | Palais-Royal | 31 May 1757 |
| Adonis, Mercure, a voice | Les fêtes de Paphos | ballet héroïque | Mondonville | Poirier, Jean-Pierre Pillot, Muguet | Palais-Royal | 9 May 1758 |
| Damon | Les fêtes d'Euterpe | opéra-ballet | Dauvergne | Pillot | Palais-Royal | 8 August 1758 |
| High Priest of the Sun | Phaétuse | acte de ballet | Pierre Iso | Pillot | Palais Royal | 20 July 1759 |
| The fairy Manto, Atis, a paladin | Les Paladins | comédie lyrique | Rameau | Pillot, Lombard, Muguet | Palais Royal | 12 February 1760 |
| Picus, Mégère | Canente | tragédie lyrique | Dauvergne | Pillot, Muguet | Palais-Royal | 11 November 1760 |
| Hilus | Hercule mourant | tragédie (lyrique) | Dauvergne | Pillot | Palais Royal | 3 April 1761 |
| Agénor (performing the role of Adonis) | L'opéra de société | comédie-ballet (acte de ballet) | François-Joseph Giraud | Pillot | Palais Royal | 1 October 1762 |
| Isménias | Ismène et Isménias | tragédie lyrique | Jean-Benjamin de La Borde | Jéliotte | Théâtre Royal de la Cour de Choisy-le-Roi | 13 June 1763 |
| Ali | Le rencontre imprévue | comédie mêlée d'ariettes | Christoph Willibald Gluck | Godard | Vienna, Burgtheater | 7 January 1764 |
| Zénis | Zénis et Almasie | ballet héroïque | de La Borde | Jélyotte | Fontainebleau | 2 November 1765 |
| Usbek | Aline, reine de Golconde | ballet héroïque | Pierre-Alexandre Monsigny | Joseph Legros | Palais des Tuileries | 15 April 1766 |
| Batyle (ou Bathylle) | Anacréon | entrée de ballet | Rameau | Legros | Tuileries | 29 August (or 2 September) 1766 |
| Lindor | Lindor et Ismène (or Isménie) | entrée de ballet | Pierre Montan Berton | Legros | Tuileries | 29 August (or 2 September) 1766 |
| Zamnis | Érosine | entrée de ballet | Louis-Joseph Francœur, called le Neveu | Pillot | Tuileries | 29 August (or 2 September) 1766 |
| Amintas | Sylvie | opéra-ballet | Montan Berton (acte I) et Jean-Claude Trial (prologue, actes I et II) | Legros | Tuileries | 18 November 1766 |
| Amphion | Amphion | ballet pastorale héroïque | de La Borde | Legros | Fontainebleau | 11 October 1767 |
| Sandomir | Ernelinde, princesse de Norvège | tragédie lyrique | François-André Danican Philidor | Legros | Tuileries | 24 November 1767 |
| Octave | La vénitienne | comédie-ballet (comédie lyrique) | Dauvergne | Legros | Tuileries | 3 May 1768 |
| Sandomir | Sandomir, prince de Danemarck | tragédie lyrique | Philidor | Legros | Tuileries | 24 January 1769 |
| Iphis | Omphale | tragédie lyrique | Jean-Baptiste Cardonne | Legros | Tuileries | 2 May 1769 |
| Hylas | La fête de Flore | pastorale héroïque | Trial | Legros | Palais-Royal | 18 June 1771 |
| The bailiff | La cinquantaine | pastorale | de La Borde | Legros | Palais-Royal | 13 August 1771 |
| Raimond de Mayenne | Adèle de Ponthieu | tragédie lyrique | de La Borde | Legros | Palais-Royal | 1 December 1772 |
| Ovide | Ovide et Julie | acte de ballet | Cardonne | Legros | Palais-Royal | 16 July 1773 |
| Bathilde/Floridan | L'union de l'amour et des arts | opéra-ballet héroïque | Étienne-Joseph Floquet | Legros | Palais-Royal | 7 September 1773 |
| Achille | Iphigénie en Aulide | tragédie-opéra | Christoph Willibald Gluck | Legros | Palais-Royal | 19 April 1774 |
| Orphée | Orphée et Eurydice | tragédie-opéra | Gluck | Legros | Palais-Royal | 2 August 1774 |
| Azolan | Azolan | opéra-ballet héroïque | Floquet | Legros | Palais Royal | 22 November 1774 |
| Alexis | Alexis et Daphné | pastorale | François Joseph Gossec | Legros | Palais-Royal | 26 September 1775 |
| Admète | Alceste | opéra-tragédie | Gluck | Legros | Palais-Royal | 23 April 1776 |
| (?) | Les romans | opéra-ballet héroïque | Giuseppe Maria Cambini | Legros, Étienne Lainez (or Lainé) | Palais-Royal | 30 July 1776 |
| Alain | Alain et Rosette | intermède | Joseph Pouteau | Lainez | Palais-Royal | 10 January 1777 |
| Renaud, the Danish knight | Armide | drame-héroïque (tragédie en musique) | Gluck | Legros, Lainez | Palais-Royal | 23 September 1777 |
| Myrtil | Myrtil et Lycoris | opéra (pastorale) | Léopold-Bastien Désormery | Lainez | Palais-Royal | 2 December 1777 |
| Médor, Coridon | Roland | tragédie lyrique | Niccolò Piccinni | Legros, Lainez | Palais-Royal | 27 January 1778 |
| The lord | La fête de village | intermède | Gossec | Lainez | Palais-Royal | 26 May 1778 |
| Neptune | Hellé | tragédie lyrique | Floquet | Legros | Palais-Royal | 5 January 1779 |
| Pylade, a Scythian | Iphigénie en Tauride | tragédie lyrique | Gluck | Legros, Lainez | Palais-Royal | 18 May 1779 |
| Narcisse, Cynire, a sylvan | Écho et Narcisse | drame-lyrique | Gluck | Lainez, Legros, Jean-Joseph Rousseau | Palais-Royal | 24 September 1779 |
| Amadis | Amadis de Gaule | tragédie lyrique | Johann Christian Bach | Legros | Palais-Royal | 14 December 1779 |
| Atys, Idas | Atys | tragédie lyrique | Piccinni | Legros, Lainez | Palais-Royal | 22 February 1780 |
| Pyrrhus | Andromaque | tragédie lyrique | André-Ernest-Modeste Grétry | Legros | Palais-Royal | 6 June 1780 |
| Persée | Persée | tragédie lyrique | Philidor | Legros | Palais-Royal | 27 October 1780 |
| M. de Mersans, the parish priest | Le seigneur bienfaisant | opéra (comédie lyrique) | Floquet | Legros, Rousseau | Palais-Royal | 14 December 1780 |
| Pylade, a priest | Iphigénie en Tauride | tragédie lyrique | Piccinni | Legros, Lainez | Palais-Royal | 23 January 1781 |
| Apollon | Apollon et Coronis | opéra (pastorale) | Jean-Baptiste Rey and Louis-Charles-Joseph Rey | Legros | Palais-Royal | 3 May 1781 |
| The knight | L'inconnue persécutée | comédie mêlée d'ariettes | Jean-Baptiste Rochefort | Lainez | Salle des Menus-Plaisirs, rue Bergère | 21 September 1781 |
| Raimond de Mayenne | Adèle de Ponthieu | tragédie lyrique | Piccinni | Legros | Théâtre de la Porte Saint-Martin | 27 October 1781 |
| Alphonse | Colinette à la cour or La double épreuve | comédie lyrique | Grétry | Lainez | Théâtre de la Porte Saint-Martin | 1 January 1782 |
| Thésée | Thésée | tragédie lyrique | Gossec | Legros | Théâtre de la Porte Saint-Martin | 1 March 1782 |
| Pylade | Électre | tragédie lyrique | Jean-Baptiste Lemoyne | Lainez | Théâtre de la Porte Saint-Martin | 2 July 1782 |
| Renaud, an infernal goddess (Alecton?) | Renaud | tragédie lyrique | Antonio Sacchini | Legros, Rousseau | Théâtre de la Porte Saint-Martin | 28 February 1783 |

== Sources and references ==
=== Bibliography ===
- Bouissou, Sylvie; Denécheau, Pascal; and Marchal-Ninosque, France (edition directors), Dictionnaire de l'Opéra de Paris sous l'Ancien Régime (1669–1791), Paris, Classiques Garnier, 2019, tome I (A–C), ISBN 978-2406090656 (in French)
- Cyr, Mary, "On performing 18th-century Haute-Contre Roles", Musical Times, vol 118, 1997, pp 291–5, later reproduced in Cyr, M., Essays on the Performance of Baroque Music. Opera and Chamber Music in France and England, Ashgate Variorum, Aldeshot (UK)/Burlington, VT (USA), 2008, ISBN 978-0-7546-5926-6 (essay no. IX)
- Pitou, Spire, The Paris Opéra. An Encyclopedia of Operas, Ballets, Composers, and Performers – Genesis and Glory, 1671–1715, Greenwood Press, Westport/London, 1983 (ISBN 0-313-21420-4)
- Pitou, Spire, The Paris Opéra. An Encyclopedia of Operas, Ballets, Composers, and Performers – Rococo and Romantic, 1715–1815, Greenwood Press, Westport/London, 1985 (ISBN 0-313-24394-8)
- Sadie, Stanley (ed.), The New Grove Dictionary of Opera, Grove (Oxford University Press), New York, 1997 (ISBN 978-0-19-522186-2)

=== Online sources ===
- Le magazine de l'opéra baroque (in French)
- Casaglia, Gherardo (2005)."Performance database". L'Almanacco di Gherardo Casaglia (in Italian).
- Parfaict Dictionnaire (1767) (in French)
- Psyché, édition critique établie par Luke Arnason (in French)
