= Mademoiselle Petitpas =

French opera singer (1710–1739)

Mademoiselle Petitpas (last name pronounced [pətiːpɑ]; c. 1710 - 24 October 1739) was a French comedian and operatic soprano.

== Early life ==
Petitpas was born circa 1710 to a Parisian father (a locksmith) and an unknown mother.

== Career ==
She debuted as a comedian in 1723 at the Saint-Germain fair, and soon after that at the Saint-Laurent fair's Comic Opera. In 1732, she met a known financier, Joseph Bonnier de la Mosson, who was the general treasurer of Languedoc provinces and had the title of "Maréchal général des logis des camps et armées du roi" (translated as "Marshal General of the King's camps and armies", and later referred as "Marshal General of France"). She first moved into Bonnier's Hotel de Lude, in the 7th arrondissement of Paris, and then later on in his castle in Montpellier, where many lavish parties were organised, despite the shock of the bishop of Montpellier Charles Colbert. After a brief stint as a performer in France, Petitpas left for England. When she came back in April 1734, Petitpas was both acclaimed for her talents and the object of conversations due to her affair with Bonnier. In 1735, Colbert wrote to Bonnier that everyone knows that he and Petitpas are living similarly to a married couple without being married. He continued by saying that no one can avoid Bonnier and Petitpas' sinful way of living. Finally, Colbert asked him to evict Petitpas – which Bonnier firmly refused. However, because of the growing scandals and talks about their relationship, Bonnier and Petitpas left Montpellier for Paris. Bonnier's family opposed to the affair, but he was decided to marry Petitpas nonetheless. He prepared in her honour a lavish feast in Plaine Saint-Denis, where a ballet was to be performed. Unfortunately, Petitpas was not able to join.

== Death ==
Aged 30, she died of phthisis in Paris on 24 October 1739 and was buried in Saint-Eustache.

== Roles ==
Opera	Composer	Role(s)	Date of premiere or revival	Location
L'Europe galante	André Campra	Zaïde	6 November 1725 (revival)	Théâtre du Palais-Royal (Académie royale de musique)
Pirame et Thisbé	François Francoeur and François Rebel	Thisbé	1727	Théâtre du Palais-Royal (Académie royale de musique)
Les Amours des Déesses	Jean-Baptiste-Maurice Quinault	Euphrosine	9 August 1729	Académie Royale de Musique
Phaéton	Jean-Baptiste Lully	Astrée	21 December 1730 (revival)	Académie royale de musique
Pyrrhus	Joseph-Nicolas-Pancrace Royer	Ismène	1730	Théâtre du Palais-Royal (Académie royale de musique)
Callirhoé	André Cardinal Destouches		January 2nd, 1732 (revival)	Théâtre du Palais-Royal
Jephté	Michel Pignolet de Montéclair	Vénus	1732 (20 or 28 February)	Académie royale de musique
Les Sens	Jean-Joseph Mouret	Zéphire; Céphise in the 14 August 1732 added entry	first version 5 June 1732, second version 14 August 1732	Académie royale de musique
Biblis	Louis Lacoste	Amphitrite	6 November 1732	Académie royale de musique
Cadmus et Hermione	Jean-Baptiste Lully	Charité	22 August 1733 (revival)	
Hippolyte et Aricie	Jean-Philippe Rameau	La Grande Prêtresse de Diane/Une bergère/Une matelote/Une chasseresse	1733	Théâtre du Palais-Royal (Académie royale de musique)
Festes Grecques et Romaines	François Colin de Blamont	Mélisse	9 February 1734 – new entry:La Fête de Diane	Académie royale de musique
Iphigénie en Tauride	Henri Desmarets and André Campra	Electra	1734 (revival)	Théâtre du Palais-Royal (Académie royale de musique)
Les Grâces	Jean-Joseph Mouret	Théodore	5 May 1735	Académie royale de musique
Les Éléments	Michel Richard Delalande and André Cardinal Destouches		27 May 1734 (revival)	Académie royale de musique
Les Indes galantes	Jean-Philippe Rameau	L'Amour/Fatime (versions of 1735 and 1736)	First version 23 August 1735 and second version 10 March 1736	Théâtre du Palais-Royal (Académie royale de musique)
Les Triomphes de l'Harmonie	François Lupien Grenet	l'Harmonie; Eurydice	9 May 1737	Académie royale de musique
Castor et Pollux	Jean-Philippe Rameau	Un Plaisir céleste/une Ombre heureuse/une Planète	24 October 1737	Théâtre du Palais-Royal (Académie royale de musique)
