= Catherine-Nicole Lemaure =

French operatic soprano

- Born: 3 August 1704; Paris, France
- Died: 14 January 1786 (aged 81); Paris
- Occupation: Operatic soprano
- Organizations: Paris Opera

Catherine-Nicole Lemaure or Le Maure (3 August 1704 – 14 January 1786) was a French operatic soprano. In 1719, she joined the Paris Opera's chorus, and after 1723 she sang many leading and titular roles throughout a career noted for sudden and unpredictable retirements until her final retirement in 1744.

== Early life and career ==
Lemaure was born in Paris, France, on 3 August 1704. In 1719, she joined the chorus of the Académie Royale de Musique, more commonly known as the Paris Opera. Her opera debut was in December 1721, in the role of Astrea in Phaëton, an opera by Jean-Baptiste Lully, and she was promoted to role of Libya in January. By 1723, she began to take lead roles, such as Hippodamie in Pirithoüs by Jean-Joseph Mouret and titular character Philomèle in Philomèle by Louis Lacoste. She was described as capricious and volatile, however, and she suddenly left the Opera in 1725 after a performance of Les élémens.

== Rivalry and overnight imprisonment ==
This period of her career was marked by a rivalry with Marie Pélissier, which was fueled by audiences who were divided between the singers. Lemaure sensed a challenge and returned from her retirement. This caused "disputes" during the first run of Pirame et Thisbé and began the rivalry between the sopranos and their fans, called the "mauriens" and the "pélissiens" after their idols. Lemaure again retired from 1727 to 1730, returning in Hésione, followed by singing Oriane in Amadis in 1731, Iphise in Jephté's first run in 1732, the titular character in Issé in 1733, and Iphigénie in 1734's Iphigénie en Tauride. In 1735, she was forced to appear in that year's revival of Jephté by threats of imprisonment if she would not do so; therefore, she intentionally bombed the performance and was booed by the audience. After she refused to continue, she was detained overnight at For-l'Évêque, a Parisian prison, until she returned the next night to sing the role correctly. In 1735, she took another retirement.

== Late career and final decades ==
In 1740, Lemaure returned to the stage. She received ovations for her performances of Oriane and Iphise that year. In 1744, she took over the role of Iphise in Dardanus from Pélissier herself, who had played that role as a member of its premiere cast. She entered her final retirement that year, not through any deficiencies in performance but through her capriciousness.

In 1762, Lemaure married the baron of Montbruel. She died in Paris on 14 January 1786.

== Artistry ==
Lemaure had a voice noted for its rare beauty and instinctively attained a great grandeur on stage, particularly in tragic roles. As audiences continued to idolize her, they compared her exceptional vocal talent to Pélissier's skilled artistry, with Voltaire writing that he preferred "Pélissier pour son art, et le Maure pour sa voix." She had a "personal fascination in performance" and received much description from Jean-Benjamin de La Borde. Voltaire wrote in 1741 that "sans la voix de la le Maure, & le canard de Vaucanson, vous n'auriez rien qui fit ressouvenir de la gloire de la France." ("Without the voice of le Maure and Vaucanson's duck, you would have nothing to remind you of the glory of France.")

Though she retired in 1744, Voltaire and the Mercure de France continued to praise her and refer to her work into the 1770s.

== Repertoire ==
Lemaure performed many roles throughout her career:

- Astrea in Phaëton (Lully), 1721
- Libya in Phaëton (Lully), 1722
- Hippodamie in Pirithoüs (Mouret), 1723 (created role)
- Philomèle in Philomèle (Lacoste), 1723
- Pomone in Les élémens (Destouches, Delalande), 1725
- A role in Hésione (Campra), 1730
- Oriane in Amadis (Lully), 1731, 1740
- Iphise in Jephté (Montéclair), 1732 (created role), 1735, 1740
- Issé in Issé (Destouches), 1733
- Iphigénie in Iphigénie en Tauride (Desmarets, Campra), 1734
- Iphise in Dardanus (Rameau), 1744
