= Télémaque (Campra) =

Opera by André Campra

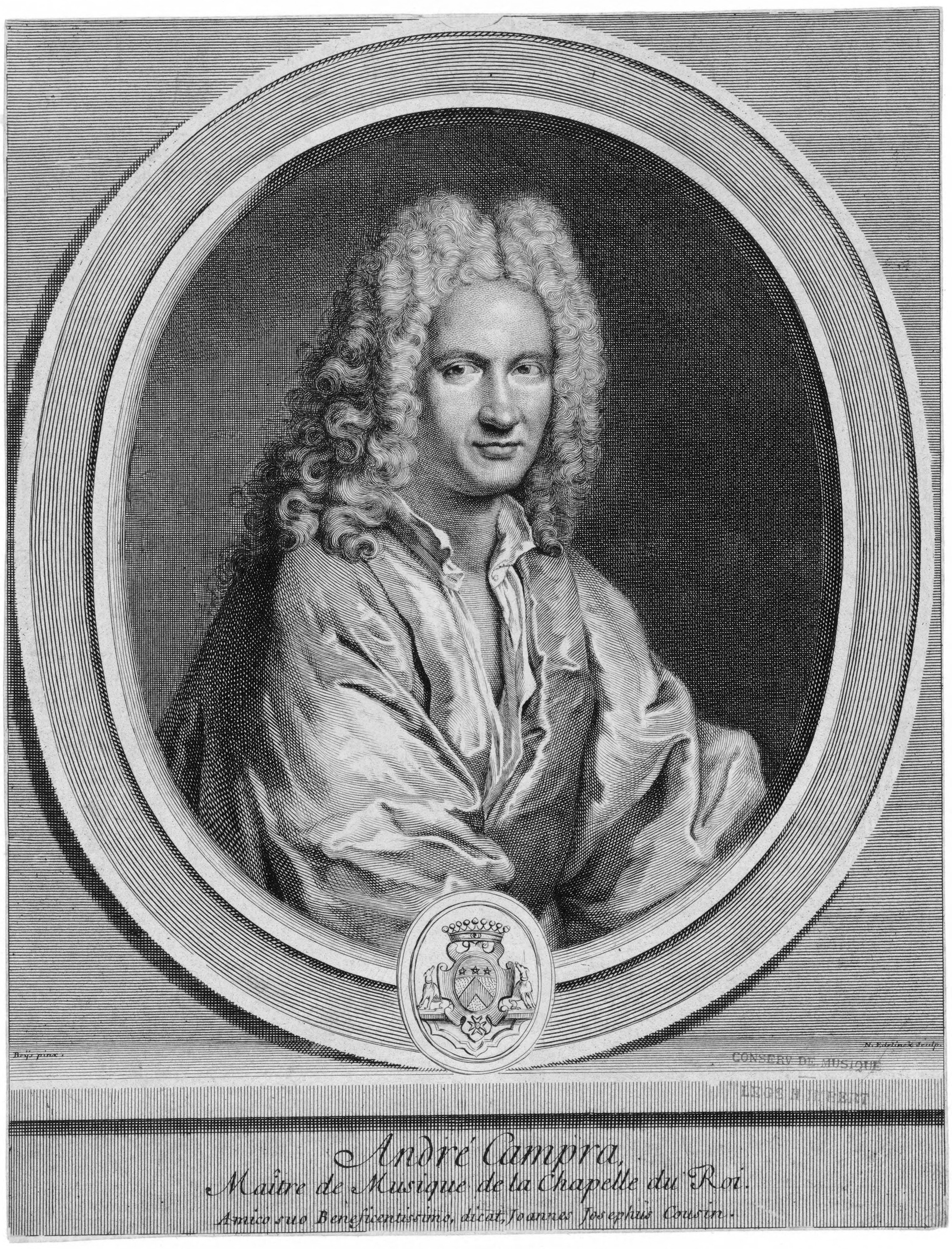
André Campra

Télémaque, ou Les fragments des modernes (Telemachus, or Excerpts from the Moderns) is an opera by the French composer André Campra, first performed at the Académie Royale de Musique (the Paris Opera) on 11 November 1704. It is a pastiche tragédie en musique in a prologue and five acts with a libretto by Antoine Danchet.

The opera is made up from musical excerpts taken from Campra's previous works and those of other composers. The works used are Énée et Lavinie, Astrée and Canente by Pascal Collasse; Aréthuse and Le carnaval de Venise by Campra; Médée by Marc-Antoine Charpentier; Circé et Les fêtes galantes by Henri Desmarets; Ariane et Bacchus by Marin Marais; Ulysse by Jean-Féry Rebel.

== Sources ==
- (in French) Libretto at "Livres baroques"
- (in French) Félix Clément and Pierre Larousse Dictionnaire des Opéras, Paris, 1881, p. 651.
