= Jean-Louis-Ignace de La Serre =

French novelist and playwright (1662–1756)

Jean-Louis-Ignace de La Serre, sieur de Langlade, was an 18th-century French novelist and playwright born in Cahors, Quercy in 1662 and died 30 September 1756.

Royal censor, he authored a biography of Molière. He was wrongly attributed some works by Marguerite de Lussan.

== Works ==
=== Librettos ===
- 1706: Polyxène et Pirrhus by Pascal Collasse
- 1710: Diomède by Toussaint Bertin de la Doué
- 1723: Pirithoüs by Jean-Joseph Mouret
- 1726: Pirame et Thisbé by François Francoeur and François Rebel
- 1735: Scanderberg by François Francoeur and François Rebel
- 1741: Nitétis by Charles-Louis Mion

=== Other ===
- 1727: Hippalque, prince scythe
- 1728: Amosis, prince égyptien
- 1734: Mémoire sur la vie et les ouvrages de Molière, in Œuvres de Molière, in-4°, tome VII

== Bibliography ==
- Cardinal Georges Grente (dir.), Dictionnaire des lettres françaises. Le XVIIIe siècle, nlle. édition revue et mise à jour sous la direction de François Moureau, Paris, Fayard, 1995.
