= Marie Pélissier =

French opera singer (died 1749)

Marie Pélissier or sometimes Pelissier (1706/07 – March 21, 1749) was a French operatic soprano. At the Paris Opera in 1722, she began her career, which was noted for her artistic skill and a scandal, until her retirement in 1741.

== Career and scandal ==
Pélissier debuted at the Paris Opera in 1722, soon thereafter marrying Victor Pélissier and appearing at his theater in Rouen. She returned to Paris after his bankruptcy, singing at the Paris Opera again on May 16, 1726 in a performance of Pascal Collasse's Thétis et Pélée, in which she won great plaudits. Later in the year she created the role of Thisbé in Pirame et Thisbé by François Francoeur and François Rebel. Her performance attracted the notice of Catherine-Nicole Le Maure, who returned from a retirement and incited a rivalry which grew to include their respective supporters, the mauriens and the pélissiens as well. This conflict included "disputes" during the first run of Pirame et Thisbé.

A scandal involving the theft of gold and money from her lover, François Lopez Dulis, led to Pélissier's dismissal on February 15, 1734, whereupon she fled to London. She was back at the Paris Opera on April 19, 1735, remaining there until retiring in October 1741.

== Artistry ==
Pélissier has been described as having a small voice whose production was, at least at the start of her career, somewhat forced. Even so, she was held by many to be the equal of Marie Le Rochois "in the emotional power of her declamation and movements". Audiences, namely Voltaire, compared her skilled artistry to Le Maure's exceptional vocal talent.

Pélissier created many roles, including five for Jean-Philippe Rameau alone: Aricia in Hippolyte et Aricie in 1733; Emilie in Les Indes galantes in 1735, Telaira in Castor et Pollux in 1737, and Iphise in both 1739's Les fêtes d'Hébé, ou Les talents lyriques and Dardanus. François-Hubert Drouais painted a portrait of Pélissier.
