= Énée et Lavinie =

Énée et Lavinie is the title of two French operas:

- Énée et Lavinie (1690) by Pascal Collasse
- Énée et Lavinie (1758) by Antoine Dauvergne
