= Michel de Bonneval =

Michel de Bonneval, real name Louis-Charles-Michel de Bonneval, (Le Mans, Maine (province) 18th century – 1766) was a French opera librettist.

A general controller of silverware and an intendant of the Menus-Plaisirs du Roi, Bonneval regulated as such the expense of clothes and furniture, ordered the masquerade balls, parties, mascarades, carousels, etc. He composed most of the operas performed in front of the court at the Théâtre of Versailles.

== Works ==
- 1736: Les Caractères de l’Amour, ballet, Paris, Ballard, in-4°,
- 1736: Les Romans, ballet héroïque, Paris, Ballard, in-4°
- 1737 and 1739: Les Amours du printemps, ballet héroïque, Paris, Ballard, in-4°,
- 1745: Jupiter vainqueur des Titans, tragédie lyrique; Paris, Ballard, in-4°,
- 1766: Lindor et Isménie, ballet (fourth entry of the ballet Romans), Paris, Delormel, in-4°.
- 1766: Les Fêtes lyriques, ballet, Paris, Delormel, in-4°.
- 1760: Le Langage de la nature, epistle, Paris, in-4°.

This list is probably incomplete but Michel de Bonneval didn't put his name on any poems.

== Sources ==
- Barthélemy Hauréau, Histoire littéraire du Maine, t. 2, Paris, Dumoulin, 1851, p. 158-9.
