= Alcine =

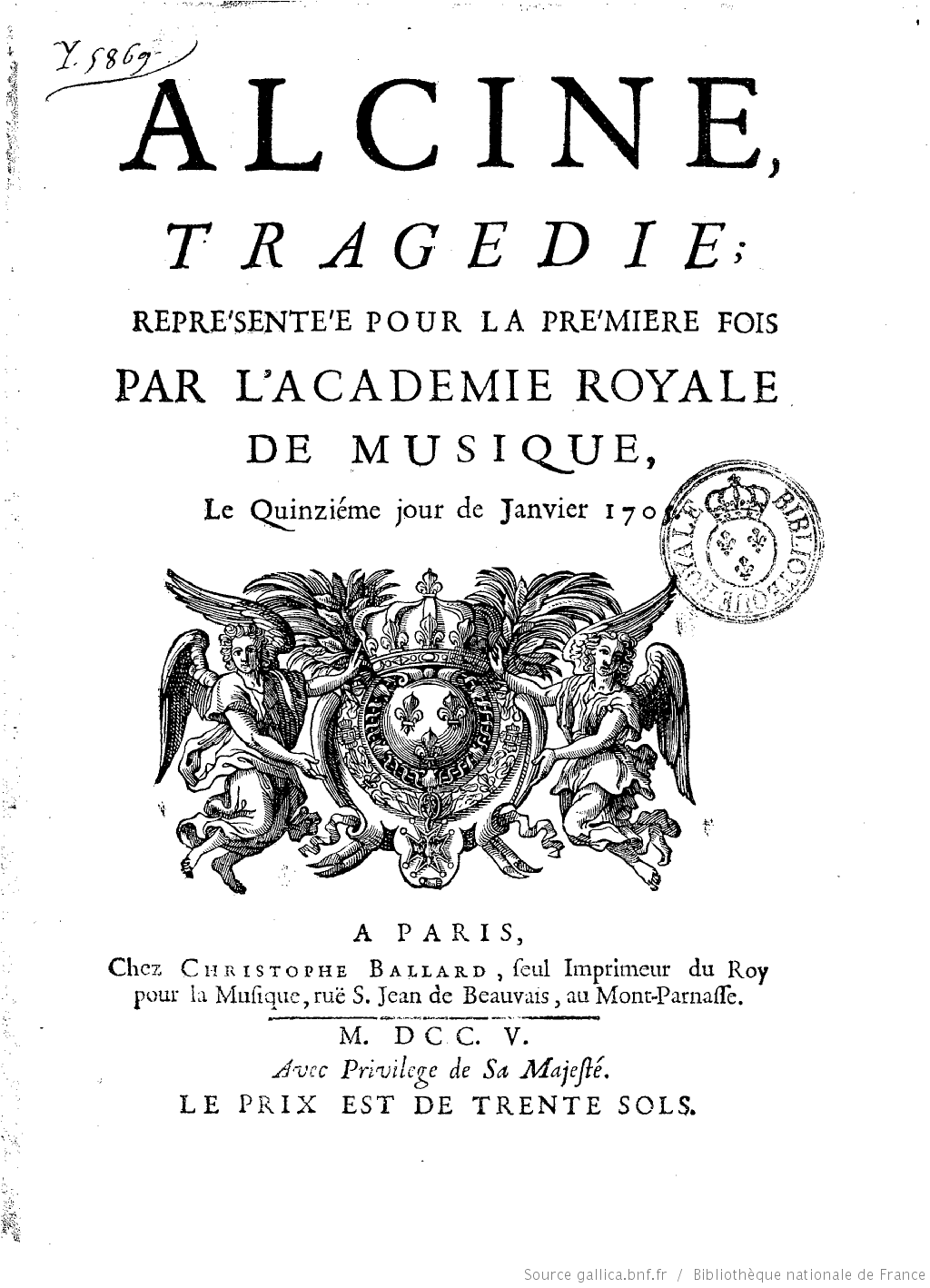
Title page of the original score

Alcine (English: Alcina) is an opera by the French composer André Campra. It takes the form of a tragédie en musique in a prologue and five acts. The libretto, by Antoine Danchet, is based on cantos IV, VI and VII of Ariosto's epic poem Orlando furioso and tells of the love of the enchantress Alcine for the paladin Astolphe (Astolfo).

== Performance history ==
Alcine was first performed on 15 January 1705 by the Académie royale de musique at the Théâtre du Palais-Royal in Paris. The opera was a failure at its first performance.

== Roles ==
Roles, voice types, premiere cast
Role	Voice type	Premiere cast, 15 January 1705
Prologue
Glory (La Gloire)	soprano	Mlle Du Peyré
Time (Le Temps)	basse-taille	Jean Dun 'père'
Male followers of Glory	hautes-contre	Jacques Cocherau and Louis Mantienne
A female follower of Glory	Mlle Vincent	
Tragédie
Alcine	soprano	Marie-Louise Desmatins
Mélanie	bas-dessus	Julie d'Aubigny (La Maupin)
Atlas	basse-taille	Gabriel-Vincent Thévenard
Nérine	soprano	Mlle Armand
Melisse	soprano	Mlle Dujardin
Astolphe	haute-contre	M Poussin
Crisalde	haute-contre	Pierre Chopelet
Nymphs of Alcine's court	sopranos	Mlles Loignon and Dupeyré
A nereid	soprano	Marie-Catherine Poussin
A magician	taille	Louis Mantienne
A male lover	haute-contre	Jean Boutelou
Two female lovers	sopranos	Mlles Poussin and Loignon
