= Acis et Galatée =

Opera by Jean-Baptiste Lully

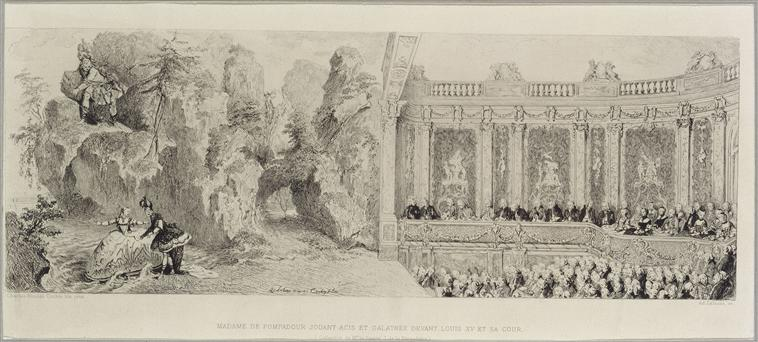
Madame de Pompadour performs Acis et Galathée in front of Louis XV and his court (1749) by Adolphe Lalauze after Charles-Nicolas Cochin the Younger (19th century) Versailles, Musée national du Château et des Trianons

Acis et Galatée (Acis and Galatea) is an opera by Jean-Baptiste Lully. Unlike most of his operas, which are designated tragédies en musique, Lully called this work a pastorale-héroïque, because it was on a pastoral theme and had only three acts (plus a prologue) compared to the usual five. Otherwise, there is little musically or dramatically to distinguish it from Lully's tragédies.

The opera was commissioned by Louis Joseph, duc de Vendôme in honour of Louis, le Grand Dauphin. Lully did not work with his usual librettist Philippe Quinault, although the two men collaborated on Armide, which premiered the same year as Acis et Galatée. The duke considered giving the commission to Racine, but it went instead to his protege Jean Galbert de Campistron. The libretto is based on the story in Ovid's Metamorphoses. The same story was also to inspire a dramatic work by Handel, Acis and Galatea.

== Performance history ==
Acis et Galatée (1686.

The opera was premiered by the Académie Royale de Musique (Paris Opera) at the Château d'Anet on 6 September 1686 (without machines) and later at the Théâtre du Palais-Royal in Paris on 17 September 1686. It was revived multiple times before the French Revolution and Madame de Pompadour appeared in one production.

== Roles ==
Role	Voice type	Premiere cast, 6 September 1686
Galatea, a sea nymph	soprano	Marie Le Rochois
Acis, a mortal	haute-contre	Louis Gaulard Dumesny
Polyphème (Polyphemus), a monster	basse-taille	Jean Dun (called Dun père)
Neptune	bass	

== Synopsis ==
The story is of a love triangle between the three main characters—Acis, Galatea, and Poliphème. Poliphème murders Acis out of jealousy, but Acis is revived and turned into a river by Neptune.

== Selected recording ==
- Lully: Acis & Galatée (Fouchécourt, Gens, Naouri, Crook, Delunsch, Félix, Masset; Les Musiciens du Louvre; Conductor Minkowski). Archiv (1998).

Lully: Acis et Galatée. Cyril Auvity (Acis/Apollon), Ambroisine Bré (Galatée/Diane), Edwin Crossley-Mercer (Polyphème), Les Talens Lyriques, Christophe Rousset. Aparté (2022).
