= Theobaldo di Gatti =

Theobaldo di Gatti (c.1650-1727) was a composer and musician, born in Florence. He moved from the Grand Duchy of Tuscany to France after hearing the music of Jean-Baptiste Lully. King Louis XIV made him a naturalised French subject in 1675. In France he was simply known by the name Théobalde.

He earned his living playing the bass viol, both as a teacher and as a member of the orchestra of the Académie Royale de Musique (the Paris Opera). He composed songs, duets and two works for the stage.

== Works ==
=== Songs ===
- Recueil d’airs italiens (Paris, 1696)

=== Stage works ===
- Coronis (pastorale héroïque), premiere 23 March 1691; libretto by Daniel-Paul Chappuzeau de Baugé
- Scylla, (tragédie en musique). premiere 16 September 1701

== Sources ==
- Article on Theobaldo di Gatti at CESAR
