= Jupiter vainqueur des Titans =

Jupiter vainqueur des Titans (Jupiter, Vanquisher of the Titans) is an opera by the French composers François Colin de Blamont and Bernard de Bury, first performed at Versailles on 11 December 1745. It takes the form of a tragédie en musique in a prologue and five acts. The libretto is by Michel de Bonneval.

== Sources ==
- (in French) Libretto at "Livrets baroques"
