= Tancrède =

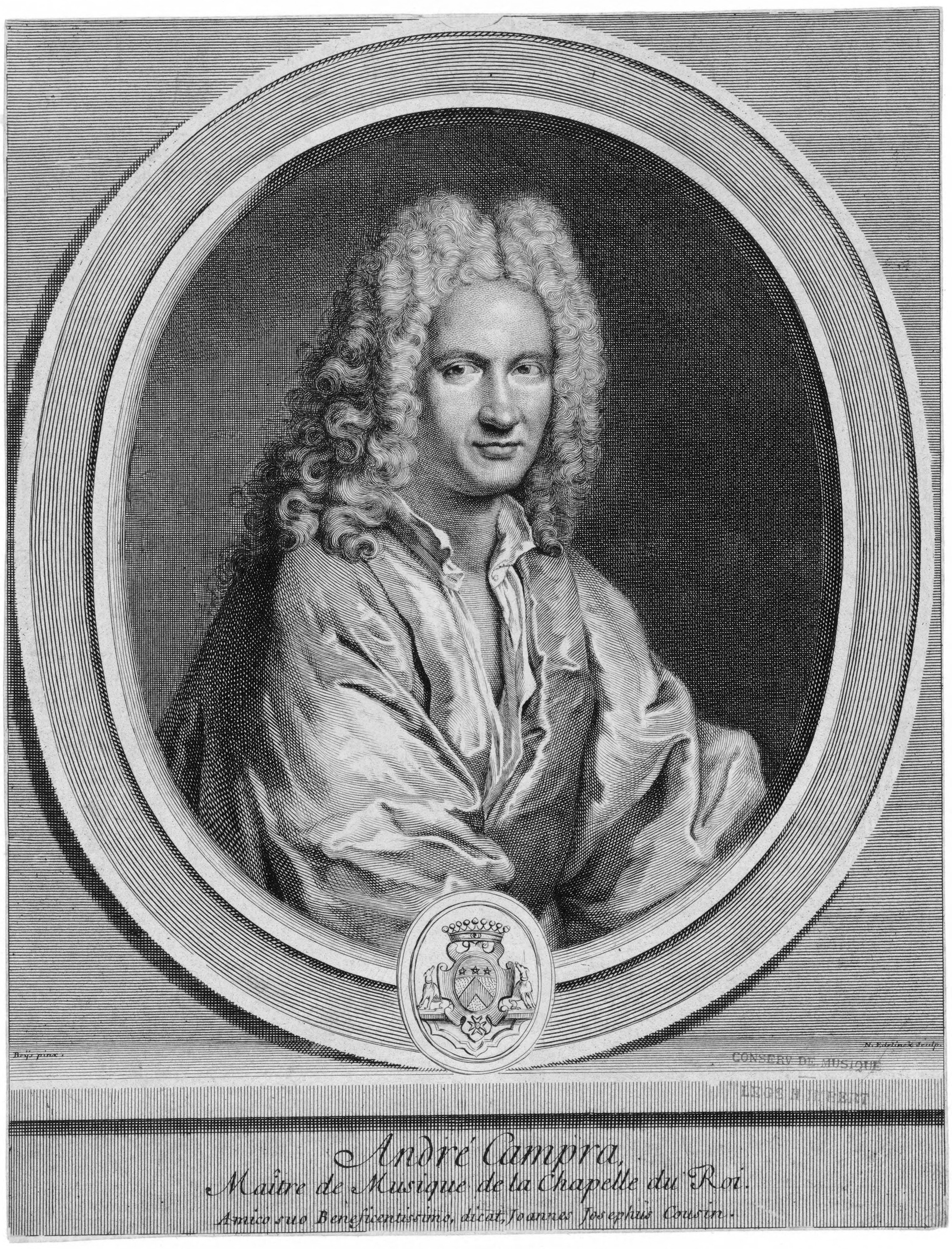
André Campra

Tancrède is a 1702 tragédie en musique (a French opera in the lyric tragedy tradition) in a prologue and five acts by composer André Campra and librettist Antoine Danchet, based on Gerusalemme liberata by Torquato Tasso.

The opera contains 23 dances in addition to the singing. It is famous for having the alleged first contralto role in French opera. (However, in modern terms it is considered more of a mezzo-soprano range.) The role was written for Julie d'Aubigny, known as 'La Maupin', the most colorful singer of this era. It's also notable for the unusual choice of three low-lying voices for the main male parts, probably due to the unavailability of leading hautes-contre in the Paris Opera ensemble at the time.

== Performance history ==
Tancrède was first performed on 7 November 1702 by the Académie Royale de Musique at the Théâtre du Palais-Royal in Paris. It was successful and remained in the repertoire until the 1760s.

== Roles ==
Role	Voice type	Premiere Cast, 7 November 1702 (Conductor: Marin Marais)
A sage enchanter/A warrior	haute-contre	Jacques Cochereau
Peace	soprano	Mlle Clément l'aînée
Followers of Peace	sopranos	Mlles Clément la cadette and Loignon
Tancrède, a crusader	bass-baritone	Gabriel-Vincent Thévenard
Argante, Saracen leader	bass-baritone	Charles Hardouin
Clorinde, Saracen princess	bas-dessus (contralto)	Julie d'Aubigny (La Maupin)
Herminie, daughter of the king of Antioch	soprano	Marie-Louise Desmatins
Ismenor, Saracen magician	bass-baritone	Jean Dun "père"
Female warriors	sopranos	Mlles Dupeyray, Lallemand and Loignon
A sylvan from the enchanted forest	haute-contre	Jean Boutelou
A warrior from Tancrède's retinue	haute-contre	Jacques Cochereau
Two dryads	sopranos	Mlles Loignon and Bataille
A nymph	soprano	Mlle Dupeyray
Vengeance	tenor (travesti)	Claude Desvoix (0r Desvoyes)
