= Tarsis et Zélie =

Tarsis et Zélie is an opera by the French composers François Francoeur and François Rebel, first performed at the Académie Royale de Musique (the Paris Opera) on 19 October 1728. It takes the form of a tragédie en musique in a prologue and five acts. The libretto is by Jean-Louis-Igance de La Serre.

== Sources ==
- (in French) Libretto at "Livrets baroques"
- (in French) Félix Clément and Pierre Larousse Dictionnaire des Opéras, Paris, 1881, p.649.
