= Alcide (Marais) =

1693 opera by Louis Lully and Marin Marais

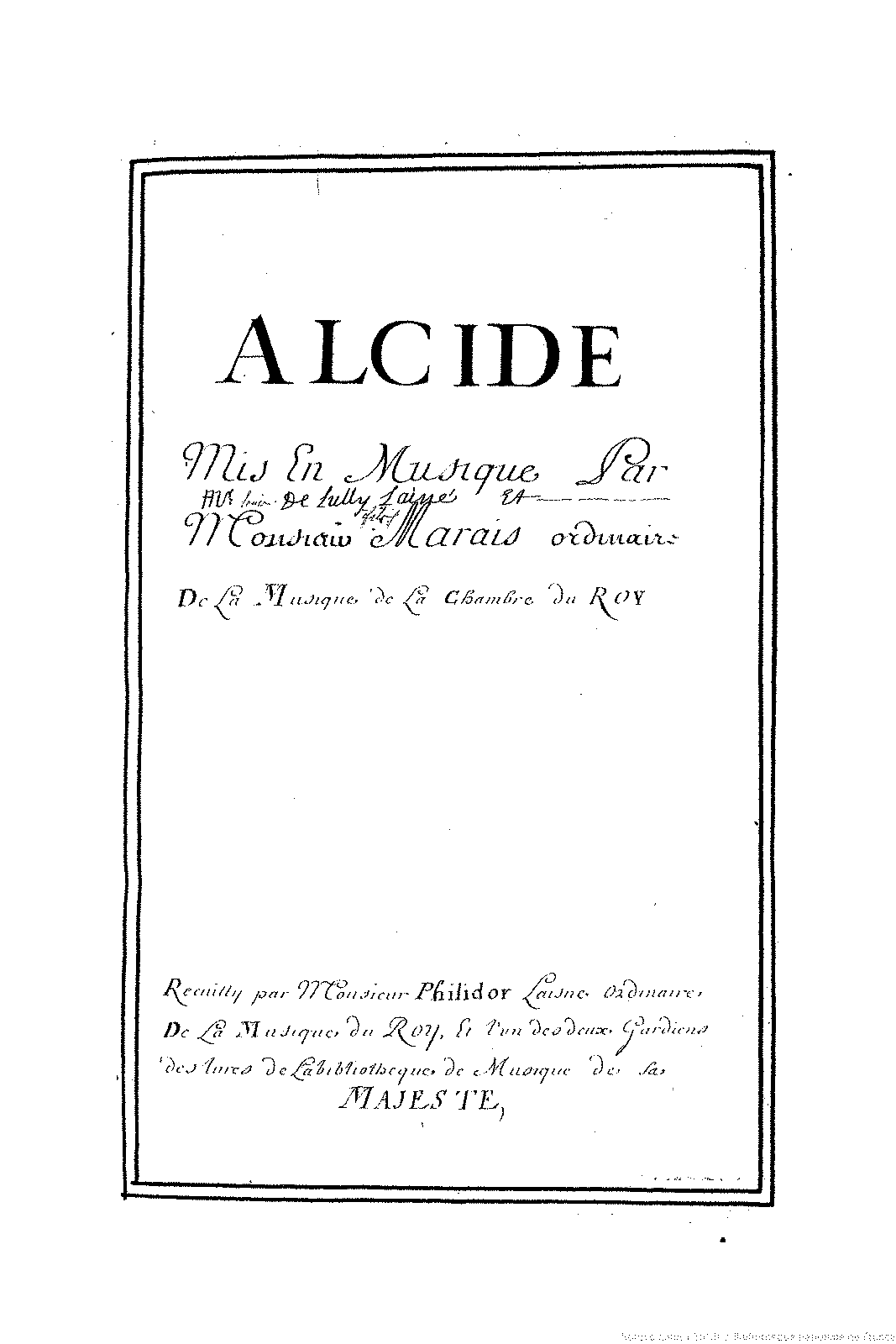
The title page of the Alcides

Alcides, ou Le triomphe d'Hercule (Alcides, or The Triumph of Hercules) is an opera by the French composers Louis Lully and Marin Marais, first performed at the Académie Royale de Musique (the Paris Opera) on 3 February 1693. It takes the form of a tragédie en musique in five acts and a prologue. The libretto is by Jean Galbert de Campistron.

== Sources ==
- (in French) Libretto at "Livres baroques"
- (in French) Félix Clément and Pierre Larousse Dictionnaire des Opéras, Paris, 1881, page 18.
