= Scanderberg (Francoeur and Rebel) =

Scanderberg is an opera by the French composers François Francoeur and François Rebel, first performed at the Académie Royale de Musique (the Paris Opera) on 27 October 1735. It takes the form of a tragédie en musique in a prologue and five acts. The libretto, by Antoine Houdar de La Motte and Jean-Louis-Ignace de La Serre, is based on the life of the Albanian patriot Skanderbeg, who led the resistance against the Ottoman Empire in the 15th century.
