= Le carnaval de Venise =

Opera by André Campra

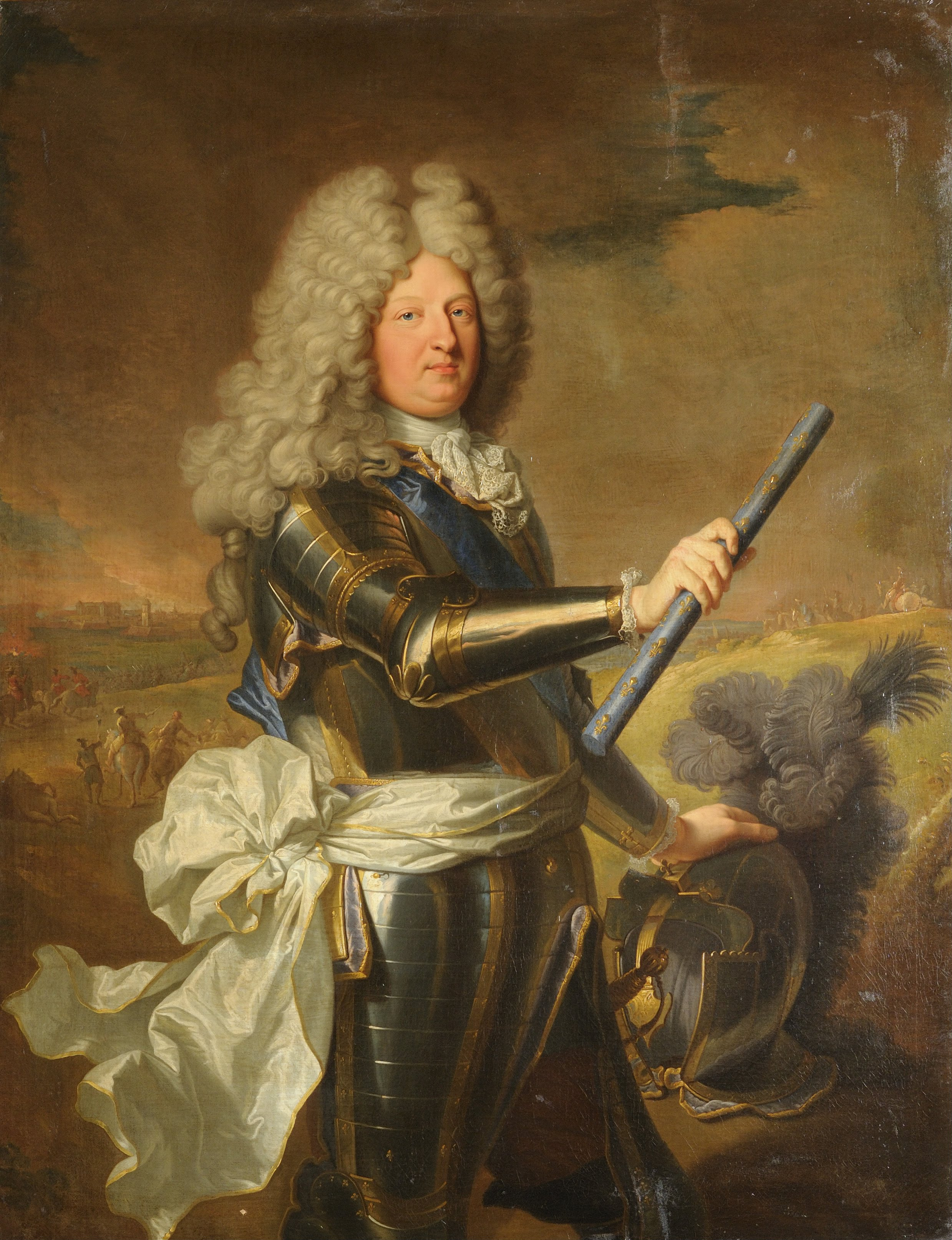
Louis, Grand Dauphin – the work's dedicatee

Le carnaval de Venise (English: The Carnival of Venice) is a comédie-lyrique in a prologue and three acts by the French composer André Campra. The libretto is by Jean-François Regnard. It was first performed on 20 January 1699 by the Académie royale de musique in the Salle du Palais-Royal in Paris. Campra dedicated the work to Louis, Grand Dauphin, heir apparent to the French throne, who enjoyed it and had it staged again in February 1711, shortly before his death. In one critic's assessment: "In a magisterial act of conflation, this composer blends the styles of Lully, Lalande, Monteverdi and Cavalli and manages also to foreshadow Handel and Rameau. He dreamt up a multi-hued score, capable of recapturing in Paris both the carnival spirit in general and that of the legendary Venice in particular."

It was presented in July 1975 at the Aix-en-Provence Festival, conducted by Michel Plasson. Jorge Lavelli directed and the cast included Christiane Eda-Pierre, Martine Dupuy, Bruce Brewer, and Roger Soyer.

The Boston Early Music Festival mounted a production in June 2017.

A recording with Hervé Niquet conducting Le Concert Spirituel was released in 2011. Vocalists included Salomé Haller, Marina De Liso, Andrew Foster-Williams, Alain Buet, Mathias Vidal, Sarah Tynan, Blandine Staskiewicz, and Luigi De Donato. Gramophone called it "a performance to brighten up the dullest mood".

== Synopsis ==
Alan Rich summarized the plot in these words:

Its first two acts use as their prop a classic commedia dell'arte plot involving love triangles, foolish old men, and an elopement. Then for some reason long buried by the sand of time, the last act is about Orpheus and his journey to Hades to recover Eurydice. That act is in Italian: the first two are in French with an amusing interweaving of Italianate slang.

The action takes place in Venice during Carnival season.

Prologue

Stagehands are urged on by a foreman to complete readying a room for the presentation of a play. Everything is in disarray, with pieces of lumber and unfinished set decorations lying about. Minerva descends to take part in the celebration and is shocked by the state of things. She decides to take charge herself and calls on the gods of the arts for their help. Music, dance, painting and architecture appear with their escorts and construct a magnificent theater. Minerva invites a choir to celebrate a glorious monarch and unveils a stage presentation of the carnival in Venice.

Act I

Venice, the Piazza San Marco. Léonore chides herself for telling Léandre she loved him since she has found him less eager ever since. She also fears her rival Isabelle. Both women confess to one another that they are loved by a young stranger and soon discover they both mean Léandre. Each thinks the other is mistaken. They confront Léandre, who at first cannot choose between them. In the end he opts for Isabelle, and Léonore swears she will avenge that insult. A troop of Bohemians, Armenians, and Slavs appear with guitars. They sing in Italian and dance. Léandre tells Isabelle how attractive he finds her. Isabelle expresses her fears about Léonore, but Léandre reassures her that he will be faithful to her.

Act II

The Salle des Réduits (discounts), where gambling will take place during the Carnival. Rodolphe, a noble Venetian in love with Isabelle, is torn between love and jealousy. Léonore arrives to confirm her suspicions, and she tells him how she has been misled by Léandre. Together they plan revenge. The goddess Fortune appears, followed by a stream of gamblers representing all the nations of the world.

The scene changes to night, with a view of pleasureful palaces with balconies. Rodolphe has positioned himself to spy on his rival. Léandre arrives with a band of musicians to serenade Isabelle. Léandre and they sing an Italian trio. Isabelle answers them, singing from her balcony. Witnessing this scene Rodolphe grows increasingly angry and spiteful. Isabelle, thinking she is talking to Léandre, expresses her hatred for her jealous former lover. Rodolphe reveals himself, and Isabelle rejects his advances. Left alone, Rodolphe plans vengeance.

Act III

A square in Venice, encircled by magnificent palaces, on which canals full of gondolas converge. Léonore is divided between her love and her desire for vengeance. Rodolphe arrives to tell her that he has killed his rival. Léonore regrets that she ever succumbed to her jealous feelings. She rejects Rodolphe in horror. Rodolphe determines to tell Isabelle of Léandre's death himself.

Divertissement of Castelans and Nicolotes, two of the city's rival factions, (Note: According to a note in the libretto, they are "two groups of opponents in Venice who during Carnival, to provide entertainment for the people, stage a fistfight to determine who wins control of a bridge".) with fifes and tambourines. The former defeat the latter and demonstrate their joy in dancing.

Isabelle learns of and laments Léandre's death. She decides to take her own life by stabbing herself, but Léandre appears and intervenes to stop her. Léandre explains that the hired assassin who tried to kill him missed his target. They confess their love for each other. Léandre suggests that they flee by boat during the theater's presentation of the fable of Orpheus and the grand ball that follows.

Orpheus in the underworld (in Italian). A theater appears and is unveiled to reveal the palace of Pluto. Pluto, warned that a mortal is arriving, alerts the gods of the underworld. He is enraptured by the song of Orpheus, who asks him to hand over Euridice. Pluto agrees to do so provided that Orpheus does not gaze at her until he emerges from the underworld. Euridice appears and in response to her repeated appeals to look at her Orpheus does so. The demons of the underworld separate them forever.

A magnificent hall. The figure of Carnival appears leading a parade of masked participants from all nations. The maskers begin dancing with great seriousness. Carnival announces he wants to see something more frivolous. A magnificent chariot appears drawn by comic maskers who join in the dance.

== Roles ==
Role	Voice type	Premiere cast
Léonore	soprano	
Isabelle	soprano	
Fortune	soprano	
Leandre	baritone	Gabriel-Vincent Thévenard
Rodolphe	bass	
Orphée		
Euridice		
Minerve		
Pluton		

== Music ==
In the final act, Campra uses several provençal folk melodies. Darius Milhaud used one of them in his Suite provençale (1936).
