= Énée et Lavinie (Dauvergne) =

Opera by Antoine Dauvergne

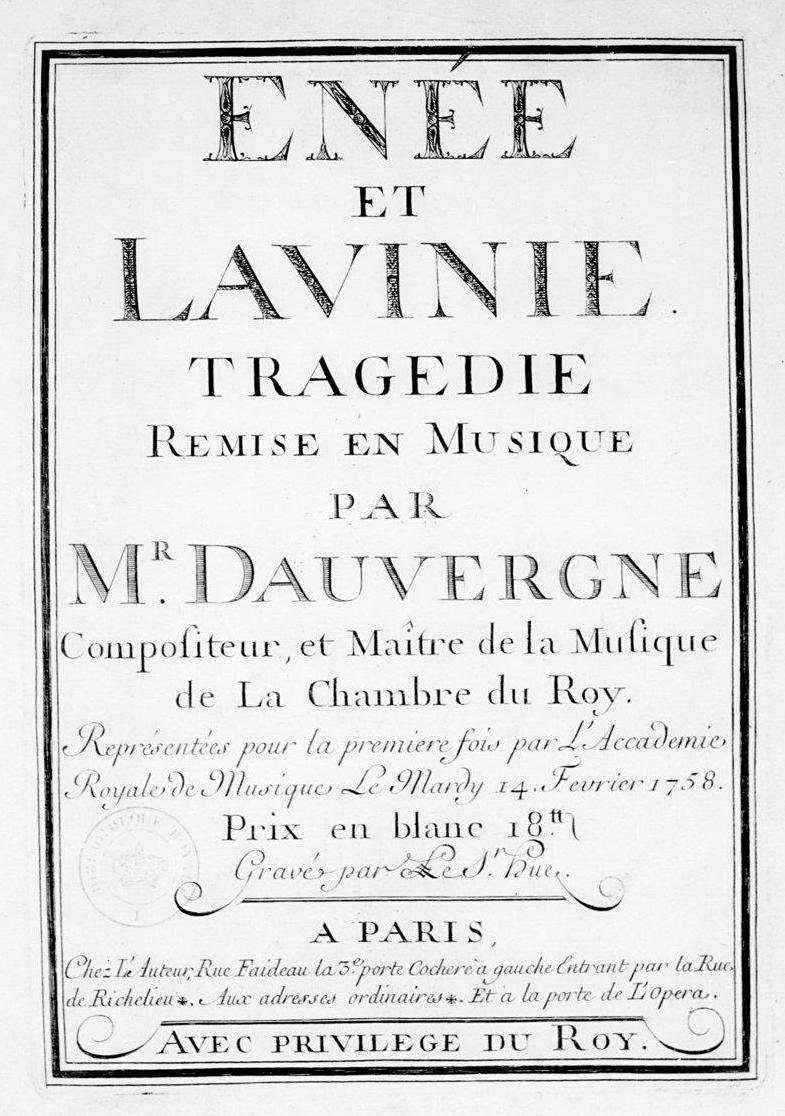
Title page of the score

Énée et Lavinie (Aeneas and Lavinia) is an opera by the French composer Antoine Dauvergne, first performed at the Académie Royale de Musique (the Paris Opéra) on 14 February 1758. It takes the form of a tragédie lyrique in five acts.

It is a resetting of a libretto by Bernard Le Bovier de Fontenelle, which was originally set by Pascal Collasse in 1690. The story is taken from the later books of Virgil's Aeneid.

== Roles ==
Cast	Voice type	Premiere
Junon (the goddess Juno)	soprano	Marie-Madeleine Chefdeville (née Jendrest)
Venus (the goddess Venus)	soprano	Marie-Jeanne Larrivée Lemière
Iris	soprano	Marie-Jeanne Larrivée (née Lemière)
Le roi, the King of Latium	basse-taille (bass-baritone)	Henri Larrivée
La reine, the Queen	soprano	Mlle Davaux
Lavinie (Lavinia), their daughter	soprano	Marie Fel
Turnus, King of the Rutuli	basse-taille (bass-baritone)	Nicolas Gélin
Ilionée (Ilioneus)	basse-taille (bass-baritone)	Person
Camille (Camilla)	soprano	Mlle Rivier
L'ombre de Didon (the ghost of Dido)	soprano	Mlle Sixce
Énée (Aeneas), a Trojan prince	haute-contre	François Poirier
Le grand prêtre de Janus (the high priest of Janus)	haute-contre	Jean-Pierre Pillot
Premier faune, the first faun	haute-contre	Jean-Pierre Pillot
Second faune, the second faun	basse-taille (bass-baritone)	Albert
L'oracle de Faunus, the oracle of Faunus	basse-taille (bass-baritone)	Desbelles
Une troyenne, a Trojan woman	soprano	Sophie Arnould
Hébé (the goddess Hebe)	ballerina	Mlle Puvignée
Chorus: Priests of Janus, Rutulian soldiers, Trojan soldiers, Latin peoples
Ballet: Latin peoples, fauns and dryads, bacchantes, gamblings and pleasures, Hébé's retinue, sylvan divinities

== Synopsis ==
Aeneas, fleeing the destruction of Troy, has arrived in Latium in Italy. The King of Latium wants to marry his daughter Lavinia to Aeneas, but the Trojan has a rival in the local prince Turnus, who is favoured by the queen and the goddess Juno. Juno provokes Turnus to fight the Trojans. The king consults the oracle of his father, the god Faunus, who says that Lavinia must choose her husband for herself and then there will be peace. The ghost of Dido warns Lavinia not to trust her faithless lover Aeneas. The god Bacchus also inspires Lavinia with a hatred of the Trojans and she announces she will marry Turnus. Aeneas reproaches her for her choice and tells her he only abandoned Dido because the god Jupiter told him to. Lavinia admits she loathes Turnus and was only persuaded to marry him by a divine fury sent by Bacchus. Turnus arrives and Aeneas challenges him to single combat. Turnus accepts. The goddess Venus brings Aeneas special armour. Aeneas and Turnus fight (offstage) and Aeneas is victorious. Juno renounces her hatred for the Trojans and the opera ends with the wedding of Aeneas and Lavinia.

== Sources ==
- David Charlton Opera in the Age of Rousseau: Music, Confrontation, Realism, Cambridge University Press, 2012.
- Félix Clément and Pierre Larousse Dictionnaire des Opéras, Paris, 1881.
- (in French) Benoït Dratwicki, Antoine Dauvergne (1713—1797): une carrière tourmentée dans la France musicale des Lumières, Editions Mardaga, 2011.
