= Ajax (opera) =

1716 opera

Ajax is an opera by the French composer Toussaint Bertin de la Doué, first performed at the Académie Royale de Musique (the Paris Opera) on 20 April 1716. It takes the form of a tragédie en musique in a prologue and five acts. The libretto is by Mennesson.

== Sources ==
- (in French) Libretto at "Livrets baroques"
- (in French) Félix Clément and Pierre Larousse Dictionnaire des Opéras, Paris, 1881, page 14.
