= Énée et Lavinie (Collasse) =

Opera by Pascal Collasse

Énée et Lavinie (Aeneas and Lavinia) is an opera by the French composer Pascal Collasse, first performed at the Académie Royale de Musique (the Paris Opéra) on 7 November 1690. It takes the form of a tragédie lyrique in a prologue and five acts.

The libretto, by Bernard Le Bovier de Fontenelle, is based on the later books of Virgil's Aeneid. A new setting by the composer Antoine Dauvergne appeared in 1758.

== Roles ==
Cast	Voice type	Premiere
Vénus, (the goddess Venus)	soprano	Fanchon or Louison Moreau
Énée (Aeneas), a Trojan prince	haute-contre	Louis Gaulard Dumesny
Latinus, King of Latium	basse-taille (bass-baritone)	Jean Dun
Amate (Amata), his queen		
Lavinie (Lavinia), their daughter	soprano	Marthe Le Rochois
Turnus, King of the Rutuli	basse-taille	Moreau
Ilionée		
Camille		
Junon (the goddess Juno)	soprano	Marie-Louise Desmatins
Iris		
L'ombre de Didon (the ghost of Dido)		
Le grand prêtre de Janus (the high priest of Janus)		

== Synopsis ==
Aeneas, fleeing the destruction of Troy, has arrived in Latium in Italy. The King of Latium wants to marry his daughter Lavinia to Aeneas, but the Trojan has a rival in the local prince Turnus, who is favoured by the queen and the goddess Juno. Juno provokes Turnus to fight the Trojans. The king consults the oracle of his father, the god Faunus, who says that Lavinia must choose her husband for herself and then there will be peace. The ghost of Dido warns Lavinia not to trust her faithless lover Aeneas. The god Bacchus also inspires Lavinia with a hatred of the Trojans and she announces she will marry Turnus. Aeneas reproaches her for her choice and tells her he only abandoned Dido because the god Jupiter told him to. Lavinia admits she loathes Turnus and was only persuaded to marry him by a divine fury sent by Bacchus. Turnus arrives and Aeneas challenges him to single combat. Turnus accepts. The goddess Venus brings Aeneas special armour. Aeneas and Turnus fight (offstage) and Aeneas is victorious. Juno renounces her hatred for the Trojans and the opera ends with the wedding of Aeneas and Lavinia.
