= Renaud (Desmarets) =

Renaud, ou La suite d'Armide (Renaud, or the Sequel to "Armide") is an opera by the French composer Henri Desmarets, first performed at the Académie Royale de Musique (the Paris Opera) on 5 March 1722. It takes the form of a tragédie en musique in a prologue and five acts. The libretto, by Simon-Joseph Pellegrin, is based on Torquato Tasso's Gerusalemme liberata. The opera is a sequel to Jean-Baptiste Lully's Armide (1686).

The libretto had an influence on Antonio Sacchini's opera Renaud, first performed in 1783.

== Sources ==
- (in French) Libretto at "Livrets baroques"
- (in French) Félix Clément and Pierre Larousse Dictionnaire des Opéras, Paris, 1881, page 570.
