= Créuse l'athénienne =

Créuse l'athénienne (Creusa the Athenian) is an opera by the French composer Louis Lacoste, first performed at the Académie Royale de Musique (the Paris Opera) on 5 April 1712. It takes the form of a tragédie en musique in a prologue and five acts. The libretto is by Pierre-Charles Roy.

== Sources ==
- (in French) Libretto at "Livrets baroques"
- (in French) Félix Clément and Pierre Larousse Dictionnaire des Opéras, Paris, 1881, page 181.
