= René de Galard de Béarn, marquis de Brassac =

French soldier and amateur composer (1699-1771)

René de Galard de Béarn, marquis de Brassac (1699 – October 1771), member of the noble family de Galard, was a French soldier and amateur composer of the Baroque era. He wrote two operas and a collection of cantatas. He was a cavalry officer, appointed maréchal de camp (major-general) in 1748 and lieutenant-general in 1758.

== Operas ==
- L'empire de l'amour (ballet héroïque, 1733; expanded version, 1741)
- Léandre et Héro (tragédie en musique, 1750)

== Sources ==
- Le magazine de l'opéra baroque by Jean-Claude Brenac (in French)
