= Toussaint Bertin de la Doué =

French composer

Toussaint Bertin de la Doué (or Thomas Bertin de la Doué) (1680 – 6 February 1743) was a French composer of the Baroque era. He worked as an organist for the Theatines, as a musician for the Duc d'Orléans and as a violinist and harpsichordist at the Paris Opéra (between 1714 and 1734). He wrote sacred music, songs, trios for two violins and basso continuo, and several operas.

== Operas ==
- Cassandre (tragédie en musique, 1706) (with François Bouvard)
- Diomède (tragédie en musique, 1710)
- Ajax (tragédie en musique, 1712)
- Le jugement de Pâris (pastorale héroïque, 1718)
- Les plaisirs de la campagne (opéra-ballet, 1719)

== Sources ==
- Le magazine de l'opéra baroque by Jean-Claude Brenac (in French)
