= Télégone =

Télégone (Telegonus) is an opera by the French composer Louis Lacoste, first performed at the Académie Royale de Musique (the Paris Opera) on 6 November 1725. It takes the form of a tragédie en musique in a prologue and five acts. The libretto, by Simon-Joseph Pellegrin, is based on the Greek myth of Telegonus.

== Sources ==
- (in French) Libretto at "Livrets baroques"
- (in French) Félix Clément and Pierre Larousse Dictionnaire des Opéras, Paris, 1881, page 530
