= Suite provençale =

Symphonic work by Darius Milhaud

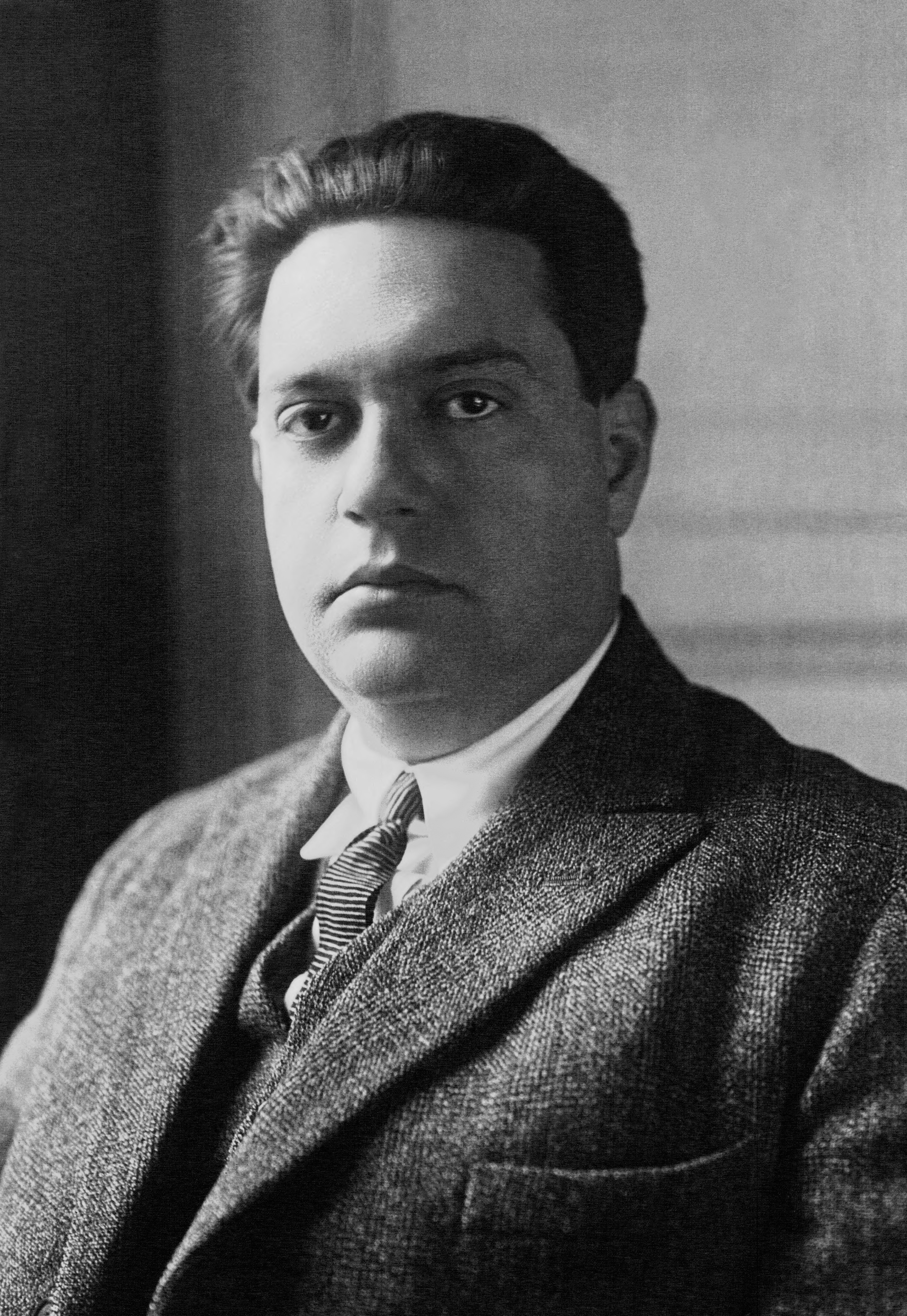
Darius Milhaud in 1923

Suite provençale, Op. 152, is a symphonic work written by Darius Milhaud in 1936. A version for orchestra alone, Op. 152c, was premiered by Milhaud himself in Venice on 12 September 1937; the ballet version, Op. 152d, premiered at the Opéra-Comique in Paris on 1 February 1938 under the direction of Roger Désormière.

Milhaud employed themes from 18th century Provençal, including themes by the composer André Campra.

== Structure ==
The work consists of eight parts played as a single movement:

1. Animé
2. Très modéré
3. Modéré
4. Vif
5. Modéré
6. Vif
7. Lent
8. Vif

A typical performance lasts about 15 minutes.
