= Ismène et Isménias =

Ismène et Isménias, ou La fête de Jupiter (Ismène and Isménias, or The Festival of Jupiter) is an opera by the French composer Jean-Benjamin de La Borde, first performed on 13 June 1763 at the Château de Choisy in the presence of King Louis XV and Queen Marie Leszczyńska. It takes the form of a tragédie lyrique in three acts. The librettist is Pierre Laujon.

The opera was performed again for the court at the Château de Fontainebleau and the Château de Versailles. It was first performed before the public in Paris on 11 December 1770, by the Opéra at the second Salle du Palais-Royal, where it was given 23 times.

The ballet performed in act 2 of the opera was Médée et Jason, originally staged four months earlier by Jean-Georges Noverre for Stuttgart and restaged in an abridged form by Gaetano Vestris. It had the distinction of being the first ballet d'action to be performed in Paris. The part of Medea was danced by Marie Allard, that of Creusa, by Marie-Madeleine Guimard, and that of Jason, by Vestris.

The ballet is described in Louis Petit de Bachaumont's Mémoires secrets:

This pantomime, which lasts nearly 20 minutes and constitutes an entire play [un poême entière], received the warmest applause. Mlle Allard plays the part of Medea, Dlle Guimard Creusa, and Sr Vestris plays Jason. The latter is without a mask, and surprised the audience by the energy of his performance, not only as a dancer, but also as an actor. He gives his character all the sublimity than one could wish for. The passions are painted on his face with a nobility, a truth, a diversity that is inexpressible, and which shows he has a singular talent for the stage. [...] Mlle Allard, for her part, has a vigorous spring [une vigueur de jarret], has hard and fiery eyes which characterise quite well the fury of a jealous woman, and the depravity governing every movement of Mlle Guimard's indicates the extent of her desire to please and to seduce. This choreography [chorégraphie] was devised [imaginée dans le principe] by Noverre, the man who has greatest genius in this genre.

== Sources ==
- (in French) Libretto at "Livrets baroques"
- Guest, Ivor Forbes (1996). The Ballet of the Enlightenment: The Establishment of the Ballet d'Action in France, 1770–1793. London: Dance Books. ISBN 9781852730499.
- Lajarte, Théodore (1878). Bibliothèque musicale du Théâtre de l'Opéra, volume 1 [1671–1791]. Paris: Librairie des Bibliophiles. View at Google Books.
- Nye, Edward (2008). "'Choreography is Narrative: The Programmes of the Eighteenth-Century Ballet d'Action," Dance Research, vol. 26, no. 1 (Summer, 2008), pp. 42–59. JSTOR 40263986.
