= Achille et Déidamie =

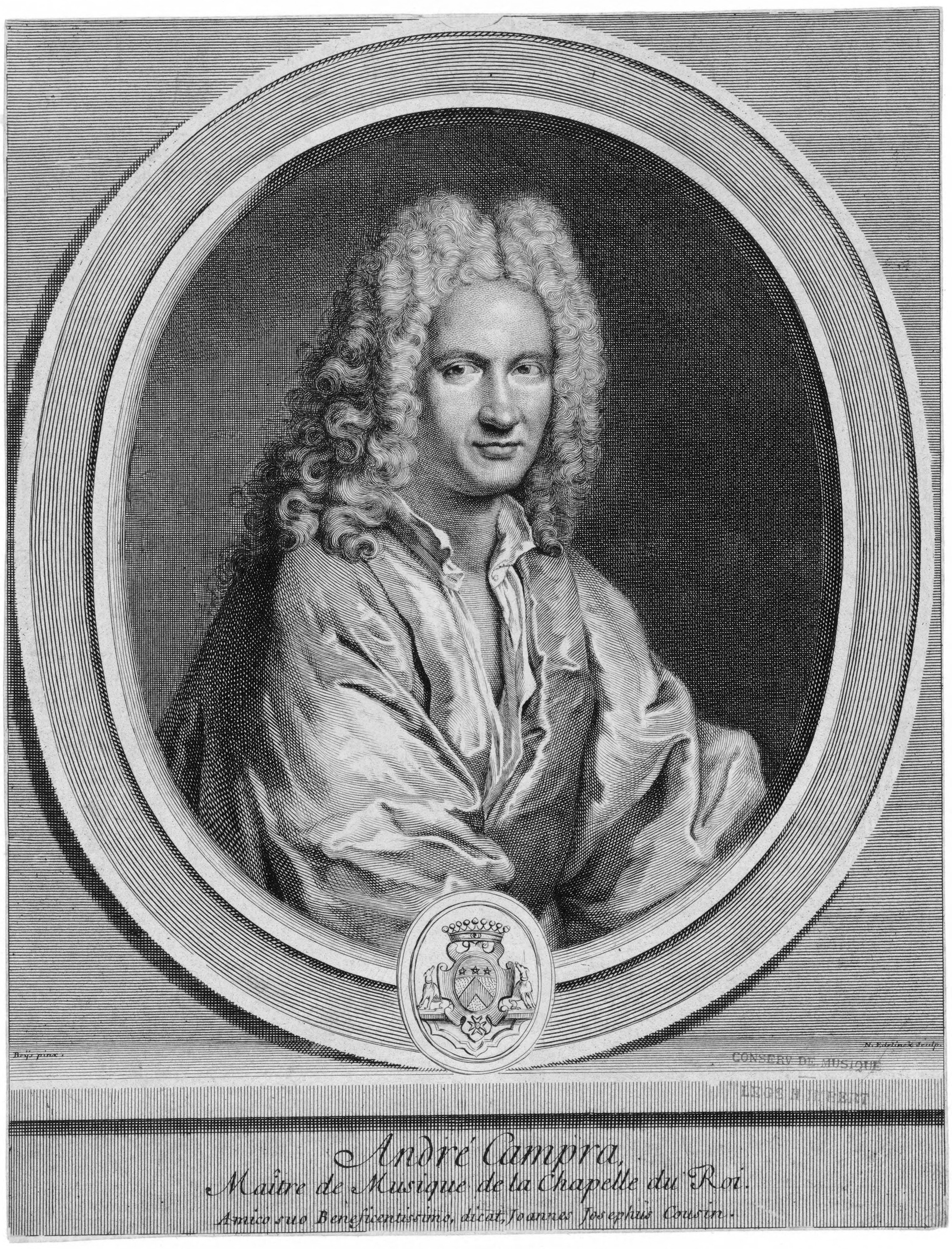
André Campra

Achille et Déidamie (Achilles and Deidamia) is an opera by the French composer André Campra, first performed at the Académie Royale de Musique (the Paris Opera) on 24 February 1735. It takes the form of a tragédie en musique in a prologue and five acts. The libretto, by Antoine Danchet, is based on the Greek legend of Achilles and Deidamia.

== Sources ==
- (in French) Libretto at "Livres baroques"
- (in French) Félix Clément and Pierre Larousse Dictionnaire des Opéras, Paris, 1881
