= Amadis (Lully) =

Opera by Jean-Baptiste Lully

Amadis, title page

Amadis or Amadis de Gaule (Amadis of Gaul) is a tragédie en musique in a prologue and five acts by Jean-Baptiste Lully to a libretto by Philippe Quinault based on Nicolas Herberay des Essarts' adaptation of Garci Rodríguez de Montalvo's Amadis de Gaula. It was premiered by the Paris Opera at the Théâtre du Palais-Royal sometime from January 15 to 18, 1684. There was a later production at Versailles without scenery or machines in 1685.

== Performance history ==
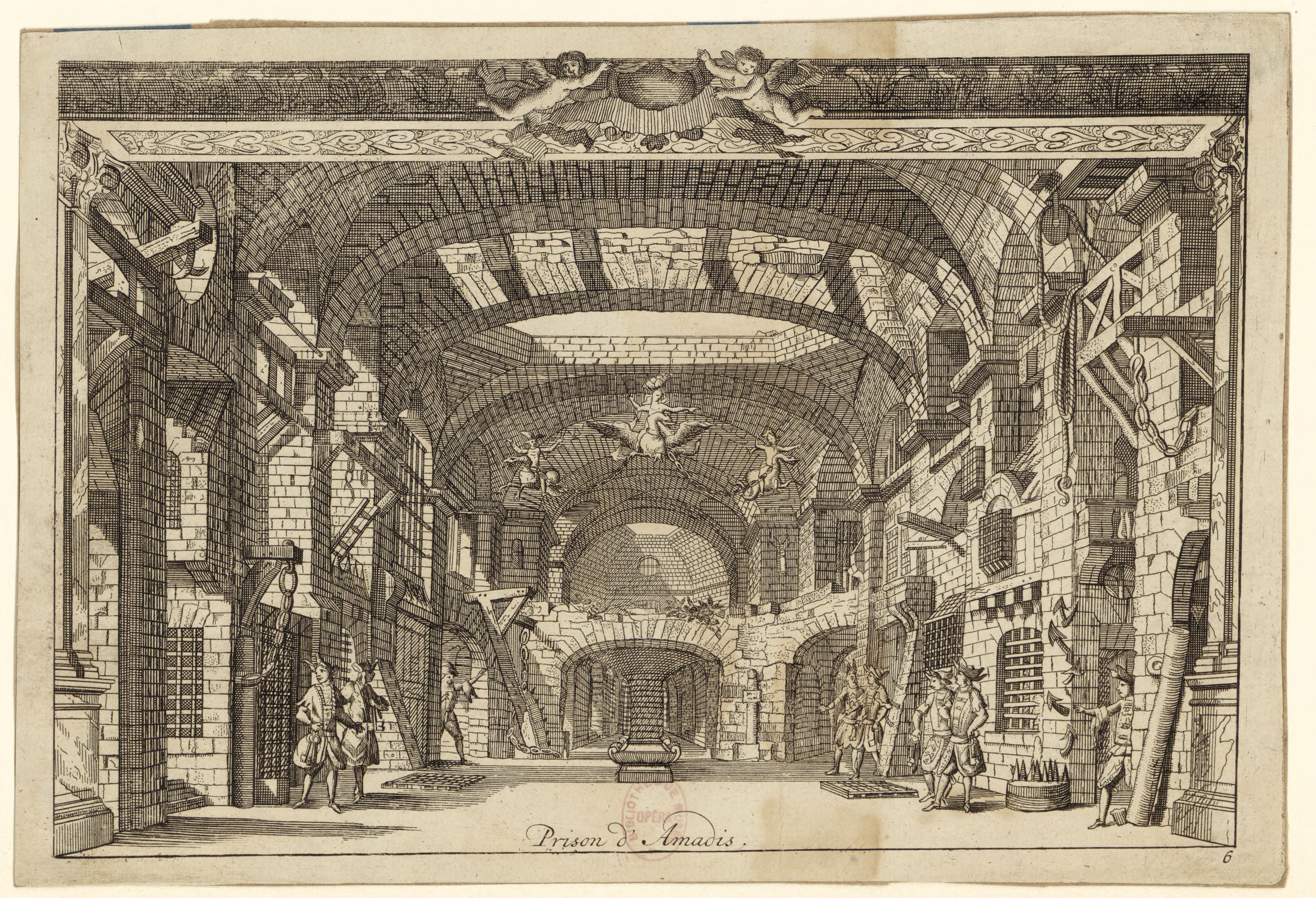
The Prison of Amadis in the original 1684 production

Amadis was the first tragédie en musique to be based on chivalric rather than mythological themes; Lully's last three completed operas followed in this course. King Louis XIV chose the theme. In the dance troupe the principal male dancers were Pierre Beauchamp, Louis-Guillaume Pécour and Lestang, and the principal female dancers were La Fontaine, Carré and Pesan. There were eight revivals of the opera in Paris between 1687 and 1771. Between 1687 and 1729 it was produced in Amsterdam, The Hague, Marseille, Rouen, Brussels, Lunéville, Lyon, and Dijon. Today the most famous aria from Amadis is Amadis' much anthologized monologue from act two, "Bois épais". At the beginning of the same act Arcabonne sings "Amour, que veux-tu de moy?", as once did 'every cook in France', according to Le Cerf de la Viéville (Comparaison, 1704–6)

== Later developments ==
The opera went by the title Amadis until 1699 when another opera, Amadis de Grèce, by André Cardinal Destouches appeared. After this, the Lully-Quinault work was billed as Amadis de Gaule. This was also the title of an adaptation of the Quinault libretto with music by Johann Christian Bach, which premiered in Paris in 1779.

== Roles ==
Cast	Voice type	Premiere, c. January 15–18, 1684 (Conductor: - )
Alquif, sorcerer, husband of Urgande (prologue)	baritone	
Urgande, sorceress, wife of Alquif (prologue)	soprano	
Amadis, son of King Perion of Gaul	haute-contre	Louis Gaulard Dumesny
Oriane, daughter of King Lisuart of Britain	soprano	Fanchon Moreau
Florestan, illegitimate son of King Perion	baritone	Jean Dun
Corisande, Florestan's beloved, ruler of Gravesande	soprano	
Arcabonne, sorceress, sister of Arcalaus and Ardan Canile	soprano	Marie Le Rochois
Arcalaüs, sorcerer, knight and brother of Ardan Canile and Arcabonne	baritone	
Ghost of Ardan Canile	baritone	
Followers, knights, soldiers, demons, nymphs, shepherds and shepherdesses, captives and gaolers, enchanted heroes and heroines etc.

== Synopsis ==
A complex story of love and chivalry depicting the faithful love of Amadis and Oriane, opposed by the sorcerer family of Arcabonne and Arcalaus, with another pair of lovers, Florestan and Corisande, as a subplot.

== Recordings ==
(key: conductor/arcabonne/corisande/oriane/urgande/amadis/arcalaüs/florestan)

- Amaducci/Guiot/Eda-Pierre/Manchet/Pietti/Sénéchal/Bastin/Massard, with the Orchestre de Chambre de l’ORTF, live in Paris, Nov. 1974, ORT 3746
- Reyne/Ricci/Masset/Laurens/Poul/Geslot/Westphal/Chuberre, with La Simphonie du Marais, live at Les Lucs-sur-Boulogne, July 2006, Accord, 3 CDs
- Rousset/Perruche/Bennani/van Wanroij/Tauran/Auvity/Crossley-Mercer/Arnould, with Les Talens Lyriques, live at Versailles, July 2013, Aparté AP 094, 3 CDs
