= Bradamante (opera) =

Bradamante is an opera by the French composer Louis Lacoste, first performed at the Académie Royale de Musique (the Paris Opera) on 2 May 1707. It takes the form of a tragédie en musique in a prologue and five acts. The libretto, by Pierre-Charles Roy, is based on Orlando Furioso by Ludovico Ariosto.

== Sources ==
- (in French) Libretto at "Livrets baroques"
- (in French) Félix Clément and Pierre Larousse Dictionnaire des Opéras, Paris, 1881, page 119
