= Astrée (Collasse) =

Opera by Pascal Collasse

Astrée is an opera by the French composer Pascal Collasse, first performed at the Académie Royale de Musique (the Paris Opéra) on 25 November 1691. It takes the form of a tragédie lyrique in three acts. The libretto, by Jean de La Fontaine, is based on the romance L'Astrée by Honoré d'Urfé. The opera was a failure.

== Sources ==
- (in French) Libretto at "Livrets baroques"
- (in French) Félix Clément and Pierre Larousse Dictionnaire des Opéras, Paris, 1881.
