= Scylla (Gatti) =

Scylla is a French-language opera by the composer Theobaldo di Gatti, first performed at the Académie Royale de Musique (the Paris Opera) on 16 September 1701. It takes the form of a tragédie en musique in a prologue and five acts. The libretto is by Joseph-François Duché de Vancy.

== Sources ==
- (in French) Libretto at "Livrets baroques"
- (in French) Félix Clément and Pierre Larousse Dictionnaire des Opéras, Paris, 1881, page 613.
