= Télèphe =

Opera by André Campra

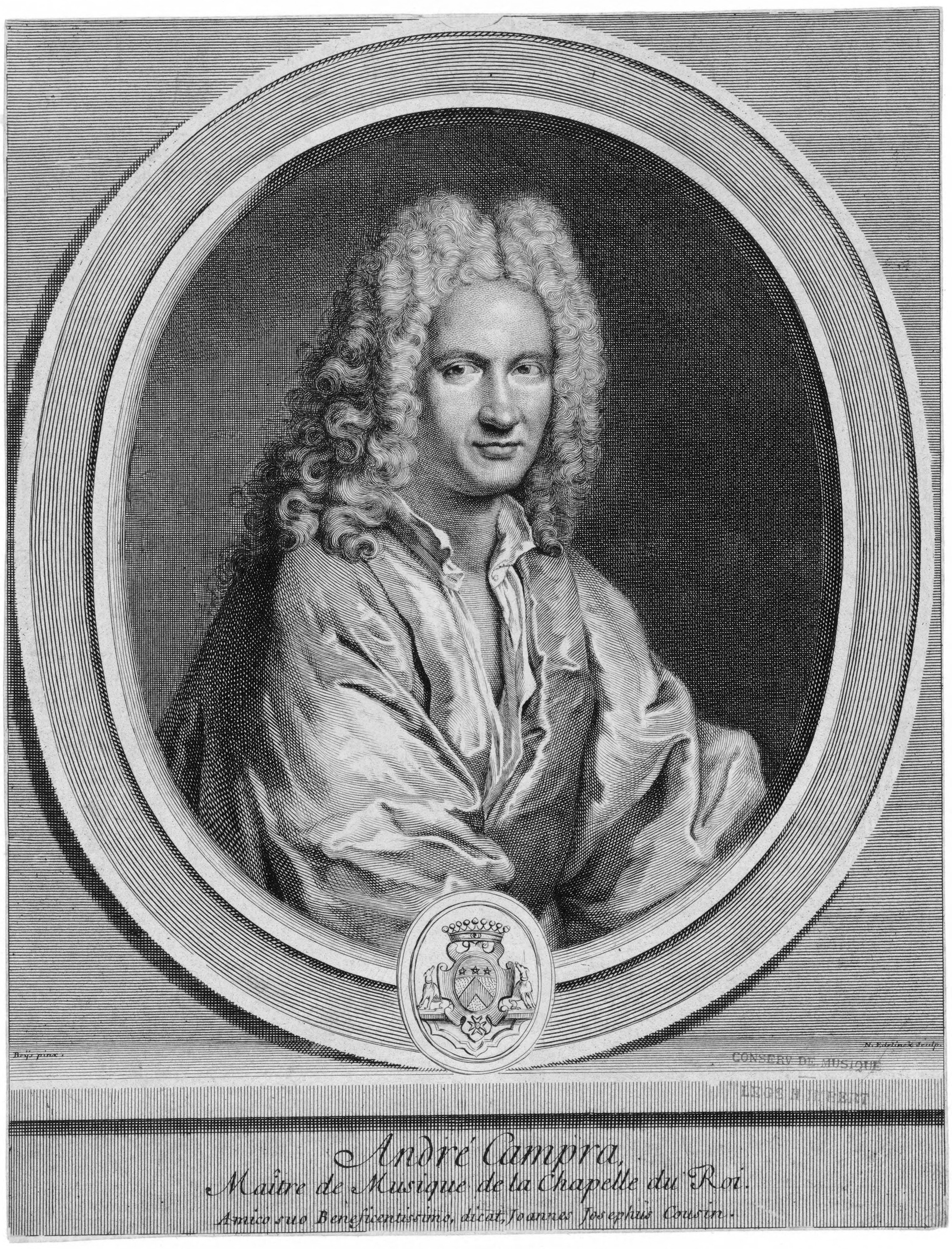
André Campra

Télèphe (Telephus) is an opera by the French composer André Campra, first performed at the Académie Royale de Musique (the Paris Opera) on 23 or 28 November 1713. It takes the form of a tragédie en musique in a prologue and five acts. The libretto, by Antoine Danchet, is based on the Greek legend of Telephus.

== Sources ==
- (in French) Libretto at "Livres baroques"
- (in French) Félix Clément and Pierre Larousse Dictionnaire des Opéras, Paris, 1881
- * Spire Pitou, The Paris Opéra. An Encyclopedia of Operas, Ballets, Composers, and Performers – Genesis and Glory, 1671-1715, Greenwood Press, Westport/London, 1983. ISBN 0-313-21420-4
