= Hippodamie =

1708 opera by André Campa

Hippodamie is an opera by the French composer André Campra, first performed at the Académie Royale de Musique (the Paris Opera) on 6 March 1708. It takes the form of a tragédie en musique in a prologue and five acts. The libretto, by Pierre-Charles Roy, is based on a dialogue by Lucian of Samosata and concerns the Greek legend of Hippodamia.
