= Louis Gaulard Dumesny =

French opera singer (died 1702)

Dumesnil (also known as Louis Gaulard Dumesny) (fl. 1677-1700 – 1702) was a French operatic tenor. His surname is sometimes found spelt Duménil, Dumény, du Mény, or Du Mesny.

Little is known about Dumesnil's early life; legend has it that he was working as a cook when Jean-Baptiste Lully heard him singing and was impressed by his natural and well focused voice, his vocal range was then known as haute-contre.

He made his stage debut in 1677, singing a small part in Isis, and then went on creating all roles within his range in a series of operas by Lully. After Lully's death he created several other roles in operas by different composers, notably Pascal Collasse, Marc-Antoine Charpentier, André Campra, and André Cardinal Destouches.

An excellent actor with a powerful voice, he seemed to have learned all his roles by memory as he did not know how to read music. Reputed as a libertine, and for his dispute with La Maupin.

== Roles created ==
- 1682: The title role in Persée by Lully
- 1684: The title role in Amadis by Lully
- 1686: Renaud in Armide by Lully
- 1686; Acis in Acis et Galatée by Lully
- 1687: Achille in Achille et Polyxène by Lully and Collasse
- 1689: Pélée in Thétis et Pélée by Collasse
- 1690: Énée in Énée et Lavinie by Collasse
- 1693: Énée in Didon by Henri Desmarets
- 1693: Jason in Médée by Marc-Antoine Charpentier
- 1697: Octavio in L'Europe galante by André Campra
- 1697: Philémon in Issé by Destouches
- 1697: Adonis in Vénus et Adonis by Henri Desmarets
- 1699: in Amadis de Grèce by Destouches
