= Léandre et Héro =

Opera

Léandre et Héro (Leander and Hero) is an opera by the French composer Marquis de Brassac, first performed at the Académie Royale de Musique (the Paris Opera) on 25 April (or the 5 May) 1750. It takes the form of a tragédie en musique in a prologue and five acts. The libretto, by Jean-Jacques Lefranc, Marquis de Pompignan, is based on the Greek legend of Hero and Leander.

== Sources ==
- (in French) Libretto at "Livres baroques"
- (in French) Félix Clément and Pierre Larousse Dictionnaire des Opéras, Paris, 1881, page 398.
- (in French) Score at La Bibliothèque Nationale de France
