= Les âges =

Les âges (English: The Ages) or Le ballet des âges is an opéra-ballet in a prologue and three acts by the French composer André Campra. The libretto is by Louis Fuzelier. It was first performed by the Académie royale de musique at the Théâtre du Palais-Royal on 9 October 1718.

== Structure ==
The three acts were entitled:

1. La jeunesse ou L'amour ingénu (Youth or Naive Love)
2. L'âge viril ou L'amour coquet (Manhood or Pretty Love)
3. La vieillesse ou L'amour enjoué (Old Age or Playful Love)

The 1718 printed score includes a further act entitled Les âges rivaux (Rival Ages), which is numbered as the third entrée, while La vieillesse ou L'amour enjoué (with some alterations) is turned into the fourth entrée.

== Roles ==
Roles, voice types, premiere cast
Role	Voice type	Premiere cast, 9 October 1718
Prologue
Hébé	soprano	Marie-Catherine Poussin
Time	bass-baritone	Le Mire
Vénus	soprano	Marie Antier
Bacchus	bass-baritone	Justin Destouches du Bourg
Act 1 La jeunesse ou L'amour ingénu
Florise	soprano	Mlle Toulou
Artémise	haute-contre	Louis Murayre
Léandre	haute-contre	Jacques Cochereau
Zerbin	taille (baritenor)	Louis Mantienne
'Masque chantant'	soprano	Mlle de la Garde
Act 2 L'âge viril ou L'amour coquet
Eraste	bass-baritone	Gabriel-Vincent Thévenard
Lucinde	soprano	Marie-Catherine Poussin
Damon	haute-contre	Louis Murayre
Cléon	haute-contre	Guesdon
Act 3 La vieillesse ou L'amour enjoué
Fabio	bass-baritone	Jean Dun "père"
Silvanire	soprano	Marie Antier
Valère	baritone	Jean Dun fils
Argant	taille (baritenor)	Louis Mantienne
Merlin	haute-contre	Jacques Cochereau
L'ordonnateur de la fête	haute-contre	Guesdon
La Folie	soprano	Mlle Haran
Un acteur de la fête	haute-contre	Louis Murayre
