= Nitétis =

Nitétis is an opera by the French composer Charles-Louis Mion, first performed at the Académie Royale de Musique (the Paris Opera) on 11 April 1741. It takes the form of a tragédie en musique in a prologue and five acts. The libretto, by Jean-Louis-Ignace de La Serre, Sieur d'Anglade, is based on the mythological history of Ancient Egypt. The work was a failure at its premiere.

== Sources ==
- (in French) Libretto at "Livres baroques"
- (in French) Félix Clément and Pierre Larousse Dictionnaire des Opéras, Paris, 1881, page 479.
