= Ariane et Bacchus =

Opera by Marin Marais

- Opera by Marin Marais
- Librettist: Saint-Jean
- Language: French
- Based on: Myth of Ariadne, recounted in Ovid's Metamorphoses
- Premiere: 8 March 1696; Académie Royale de Musiquel, Paris

Ariane et Bacchus (Ariadne and Bacchus) is an opera by Marin Marais first performed at the Académie Royale de Musique (the Paris Opera) on 8 March 1696. It takes the form of a tragédie en musique in five acts and a prologue. The libretto by Saint-Jean is based on Ovid's Metamorphoses and deals with the legend of Ariadne.

== Sources ==
- (in French) Félix Clément and Pierre Larousse Dictionnaire des Opéras, Paris, 1881
