= Louis Lacoste (composer) =

French composer

Louis Lacoste, also given as De La Coste (c. 1675 – c. 1750) was a French composer of the Baroque era. He was a singer, first appearing in the chorus of André-Cardinal Destouches' Issé (1697) then chorus master and leader of the orchestra at the Paris Opéra (from 1710 to 1714). He composed several works for the stage, the most successful of which was Philomèle, first performed on 20 October 1705 by the Académie Royale de Musique at the Théâtre du Palais-Royal in Paris, and revived in 1709, 1723, and 1734. Bradamante was a "bruising failure".

== Operas ==
(all tragédies en musique, except for Aricie, a ballet and Iris & Silvandre, an idylle en musique)

- Aricie (1697)
- Iris & Silvandre (1704)
- Philomèle (1705)
- Bradamante (1707)
- Créuse l'athénienne (1712)
- Télégone (1725)
- Orion (1728)
- Biblis (1732)
