= Pirame et Thisbé =

Pirame et Thisbé (Pyramus and Thisbe) is an opera by the French composers François Francoeur and François Rebel, first performed at the Académie Royale de Musique (the Paris Opera) on 17 October 1726. It takes the form of a tragédie en musique in a prologue and five acts. The libretto, by Jean-Louis-Ignace de La Serre, is based on the story of Pyramus and Thisbe in Ovid's Metamorphoses. The role of Thisbé was created by Marie Pélissier.

== Recording ==
- Pirame et Thisbé, Thomas Dolié, Judith van Wanroij, Jeffrey Thompson, Katia Velletaz, Jean Teitgen, Ensemble Stradivaria, Chœur de l'Académie Baroque, conducted by Daniel Cuiller (2 CDs, Mirare, 2008)

== Sources ==
- (in French) Libretto at "Livrets baroques"
- (in French) Félix Clément and Pierre Larousse Dictionnaire des Opéras, Paris, 1881, p.559.
