= Biblis (opera) =

Opera by Louis Lacoste

Biblis (Byblis) is an opera by the French composer Louis Lacoste, first performed at the Académie Royale de Musique (the Paris Opera) on 6 November 1732. It takes the form of a tragédie en musique in a prologue and five acts. The libretto, by de Fleury, is based on the myth of Byblis in Ovid's Metamorphoses.

== Sources ==
- (in French) Félix Clément and Pierre Larousse Dictionnaire des Opéras, Paris, 1881, page 110.
