= Charles-Louis Mion =

French composer

Charles-Louis Mion (17 December 1699 – 12 September 1775) was a French composer of the Baroque era. He was the grand-nephew of Michel Richard Delalande who also taught him music. Between 1710 and 1718 he was a choirboy at the Sainte-Chapelle du Palais (for the French royal family). Later in life he became music teacher to his patroness Madame de Pompadour. In 1755 he was appointed master of music to Les Enfants de France. He wrote motets and operas, one of which (L'année galante) earned him a royal pension of 2,000 livres.

== Stage works ==
- Nitétis (tragédie en musique, 1741)
- Les quatre parties du monde (ballet, 1745)
- L'année galante (ballet héroïque, 1747)
- Julie et Ovide (ballet héroïque, 1753)

== Sources ==
- Le magazine de l'opéra baroque by Jean-Claude Brenac (in French)
