= Thétis et Pélée =

Opera by Pascal Collasse

Thétis et Pelée (Thetis and Peleus) is an opera by the French composer Pascal Collasse, first performed at the Académie Royale de Musique (the Paris Opéra) on 11 January 1689. It takes the form of a tragédie lyrique in a prologue and five acts. The libretto is by Bernard Le Bovier de Fontenelle.

== Sources ==
- (in French) Libretto at "Livrets baroques"
- (in French) Félix Clément and Pierre Larousse Dictionnaire des Opéras, Paris, 1881, p. 660.
