= Pyrrhus (Royer) =

Opera by Joseph-Nicolas-Pancrace Royer

Pyrrhus is an opera by the French composer Joseph-Nicolas-Pancrace Royer, first performed at the Académie Royale de Musique (the Paris Opera) on 26 October 1730. It takes the form of a tragédie en musique in a prologue and five acts. The libretto, by Fermelhuis, is based on the Greek myth of Pyrrhus, son of Achilles.

The opera was revived at Versailles on 16 September 2012. The performance was recorded and subsequently released in 2014.

== Recording ==
- Pyrrhus, Alain Buet (Pyrrhus), Guillemette Laurens (Eriphile), Emmanuelle de Negri (Polixène), Jeffrey Thompson (Acamas), Orchestra and chorus of Les Enfants d'Apollon, conducted by Michael Greenberg (Alpha, 2014)

== Sources ==
- (in French) Libretto at "Livres baroques"
- (in French) Félix Clément and Pierre Larousse Dictionnaire des Opéras, Paris, 1881, page 559.
