= Pastorale héroïque =

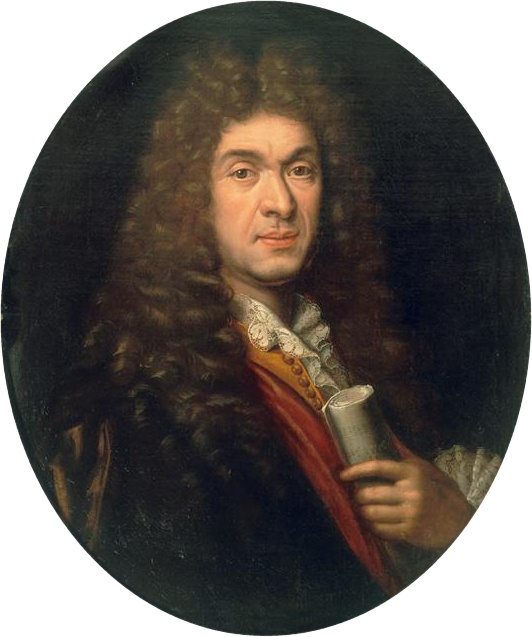
Jean-Baptiste Lully by Paul Mignard

Pastorale héroïque was a type of ballet héroïque, a form of the opéra-ballet genre of French Baroque opera. The first work to bear the name was Jean-Baptiste Lully's final completed opera Acis et Galatée (1686), although musical works on pastoral themes had already appeared on the French stage. The pastorale héroïque usually drew on classical subject matter associated with pastoral poetry. Like the tragédie en musique, it had an allegorical prologue; however, its structure consisted of three acts, rather than the five of the tragédie en musique. Later examples were written by Jean-Philippe Rameau; these include Zaïs (1748), Naïs (1749), and Acante et Céphise (1751).

== Bibliography ==
- Powers, D M The 'Pastorale Héroïque': Origins and Development of a Genre of French Opera in the 17th and 18th Centuries (dissertation, University of Chicago, 1988)

== Sources ==
- Sadie, Stanley ed. (1992), 'Pastorale-héroïque' in The New Grove Dictionary of Opera, ISBN 0-333-73432-7
