= Philomèle =

Philomèle is an opera by the French composer Louis Lacoste, first performed at the Académie Royale de Musique (the Paris Opera) on 20 October 1705. It takes the form of a tragédie en musique in a prologue and five acts. The libretto, by Pierre-Charles Roy, is based on the story of Philomela as told in Ovid's Metamorphoses.

== Sources ==
- (in French) Libretto at "Livrets baroques"
- (in French) Félix Clément and Pierre Larousse Dictionnaire des Opéras, Paris, 1881, page 530
