= Tragédie en musique =

Opera genre

Tragédie en musique (French: [tʁaʒedi ɑ̃ myzik], musical tragedy), also known as tragédie lyrique (French: [tʁaʒedi liʁik], lyric tragedy), is a genre of French opera introduced by Jean-Baptiste Lully and used by his followers until the second half of the eighteenth century. Operas in this genre are usually based on stories from classical mythology or the Italian romantic epics of Tasso and Ariosto. The stories may not necessarily have a tragic ending – in fact, most do not – but the works' atmospheres are suffused throughout with an affect of nobility and stateliness. The standard tragédie en musique has five acts. Early works in the genre were preceded by an allegorical prologue and, during the lifetime of Louis XIV, these generally celebrated the king's noble qualities and his prowess in war. Each of the five acts usually follows a basic pattern, opening with an aria in which one of the main characters expresses their feelings, followed by dialogue in recitative interspersed with short arias (petits airs), in which the main business of the plot occurs. Each act traditionally ends with a divertissement, offering great opportunities for the chorus and the ballet troupe. Composers sometimes changed the order of these features in an act for dramatic reasons.

== Notable examples of the genre ==
Apart from Lully, the most considerable writer of tragédies en musique is Rameau, whose five works in the form are considered the culminating masterpieces of the genre. The Viking Opera Guide refers to Marc-Antoine Charpentier's tragédie Médée as "arguably the finest French opera of the seventeenth century". In the eighteenth century, Jean-Marie Leclair's lone tragédie Scylla et Glaucus has been similarly praised. Other highly esteemed exponents are André Campra (Tancrède, Idoménée), Marin Marais (Alcyone, Sémélé) and Michel Pignolet de Montéclair (Jephté).

== List of works in this genre ==
=== Jean-Baptiste Lully ===
- Cadmus et Hermione (1673)
- Alceste (1674)
- Thésée (1675)
- Atys (1676)
- Isis (1677)
- Psyché (1678)
- Bellérophon (1679)
- Proserpine (1680)
- Persée (1682)
- Phaëthon (1683)
- Amadis (1684)
- Roland (1685)
- Armide (1686)
- Achille et Polyxène (1687, completed by Pascal Collasse)

=== Works by Lully's sons ===
- Orphée (1690) (by Louis and Jean-Baptiste the Younger)
- Alcide (by Louis Lully and Marin Marais)

=== Paolo Lorenzani ===
- Oronthée (1688)

=== Pascal Collasse ===
- Thétis et Pélée (1689)
- Énée et Lavinie (1691)
- Astrée (1691)
- Jason, ou La toison d'or (1696)
- Canente (1700)
- Polyxène et Pirrhus (1706)

=== Marc-Antoine Charpentier ===
- David et Jonathas (1688)
- Celse martyr (1687, lost)
- Philomèle (lost)
- Artaxerse (lost)
- Médée (1693)

=== Henri Desmarets ===
- Didon (1693)
- Circé (1694)
- Théagène et Chariclée (1695)
- Vénus et Adonis (1697)
- Iphigénie en Tauride (1704, completed by Campra)
- Renaud ou la suite d'Armide (1722)

=== Marin Marais ===
- Alcide (1693) (with Lully's son, Louis)
- Ariane et Bacchus (1696)
- Alcyone (1706)
- Sémélé (1709)

=== Élisabeth Jacquet de La Guerre ===
- Céphale et Procris (1694)

=== Charles-Hubert Gervais ===
- Méduse (1697)
- Hypermnestre (1716)

=== André Cardinal Destouches ===
- Amadis de Grèce (1699)
- Marthésie, reine des Amazones (1699)
- Omphale (1701)
- Callirhoé (1712)
- Télémaque (or Télémaque et Calypso) (1714)
- Sémiramis (1718)

=== André Campra ===
- Hésione (1700)
- Tancrède (1702)
- Télémaque (1704)
- Alcine (1705)
- Hippodamie (1708)
- Idoménée (1712)
- Télèphe (1713)
- Camille, reine des volsques (1717)
- Achille et Déidamie (1735)

=== Theobaldo di Gatti ===
- Scylla (1701)

=== Jean-Féry Rebel ===
- Ulysse (1703)

=== François Bouvard ===
- Médus, roi des Mèdes (1702)

=== Louis Lacoste ===
- Philomèle (1705)
- Bradamante (1707)
- Créuse l'athénienne (1712)
- Télégone (1725)
- Orion (1728)
- Biblis (1732)

=== Toussaint Bertin de la Doué ===
- Cassandre (1706) (with François Bouvard)
- Diomède (1710)
- Ajax (1712)

=== Jean-Baptiste Stuck ===
- Méléagre (1709)
- Manto la fée (1711)
- Polydore (1720)

=== Joseph François Salomon ===
- Médée et Jason (1713)
- Théonoé (1715)

=== Jean-Baptiste Matho ===
- Arion (1714)

=== Jean-Joseph Mouret ===
- Ariane (1717)
- Pirithoüs (1723)

=== François Francoeur and François Rebel ===
- Pirame et Thisbé (1726)
- Tarsis et Zélie (1728)
- Scanderberg (1735)

=== Joseph-Nicolas-Pancrace Royer ===
- Pyrrhus (1730)
- Prométhée et Pandore (1744) Lost

=== Michel Pignolet de Montéclair ===
- Jephté (1732)

=== Jean-Philippe Rameau ===
- Hippolyte et Aricie (1733)
- Samson (lost)
- Castor et Pollux (1737)
- Dardanus (1739)
- Zoroastre (1749)
- Linus (1750) (lost)
- Les Boréades (1764)

=== Charles-Louis Mion ===
- Nitétis (1741)

=== François Colin de Blamont ===
- Jupiter vainqueur des Titans (1745) (with Bernard de Bury)

=== Jean-Marie Leclair ===
- Scylla et Glaucus (1746)

=== Joseph Bodin de Boismortier ===
- Daphné (1748)

=== Marquis de Brassac ===
- Léandre et Héro (1750)

=== Antoine Dauvergne ===
- Énée et Lavinie (1758)
- Canente (1760)
- Hercule mourant (1761)
- Polixène (1763)

=== Jean-Benjamin de La Borde ===
- Ismène et Isménias (1763)

=== Jean-Joseph de Mondonville ===
- Thésée (1765) Lost

=== François-Joseph Gossec ===
- Sabinus (1773)
- Thésée (1782)

=== François-André Danican Philidor ===
- Persée (1780)
- Thémistocle (1785)
- Ernelinde, princesse de Norvège (1767)

=== Niccolò Piccinni ===
- Roland (1778)
- Atys (1780)
- Iphigénie en Tauride (1781)
- Adèle de Ponthieu (1781)
- Didon (1783)
- Pénélope (1785)
- Clytemnestre (1787)

=== Christoph Willibald Gluck ===
- Armide (Gluck) (1777)

=== Johann Christian Bach ===
- Amadis de Gaule (J. C. Bach) (1779)

=== Antonio Sacchini ===
- Renaud (1783)
- Canente (1760)
- Dardanus (1783)
- Œdipe à Colone (1786)
- Arvire et Évélina (1788) unfinished, completed by Jean-Baptiste Rey

=== Jean-Baptiste Le Moyne ===
- Électre (1782)
- Phèdre (1786)
- Nephté (1789)

=== Charles-Simon Catel ===
• Sémiramis (1802)

=== Luigi Cherubini ===
- Démophoon (1788)
- Les Abencérages, ou L'étendard de Grenade (1813)
- Ali Baba, ou Les quarante voleurs (1833)

=== Gaspare Spontini ===
- La vestale (1807)
- Fernand Cortez, ou La conquête du Mexique (1809)
- Olimpie (1819)

=== Anton Reicha ===
- Sapho (1822)

=== Gioachino Rossini ===
- Le siège de Corinthe (1826)
