= André Campra =

French composer and conductor

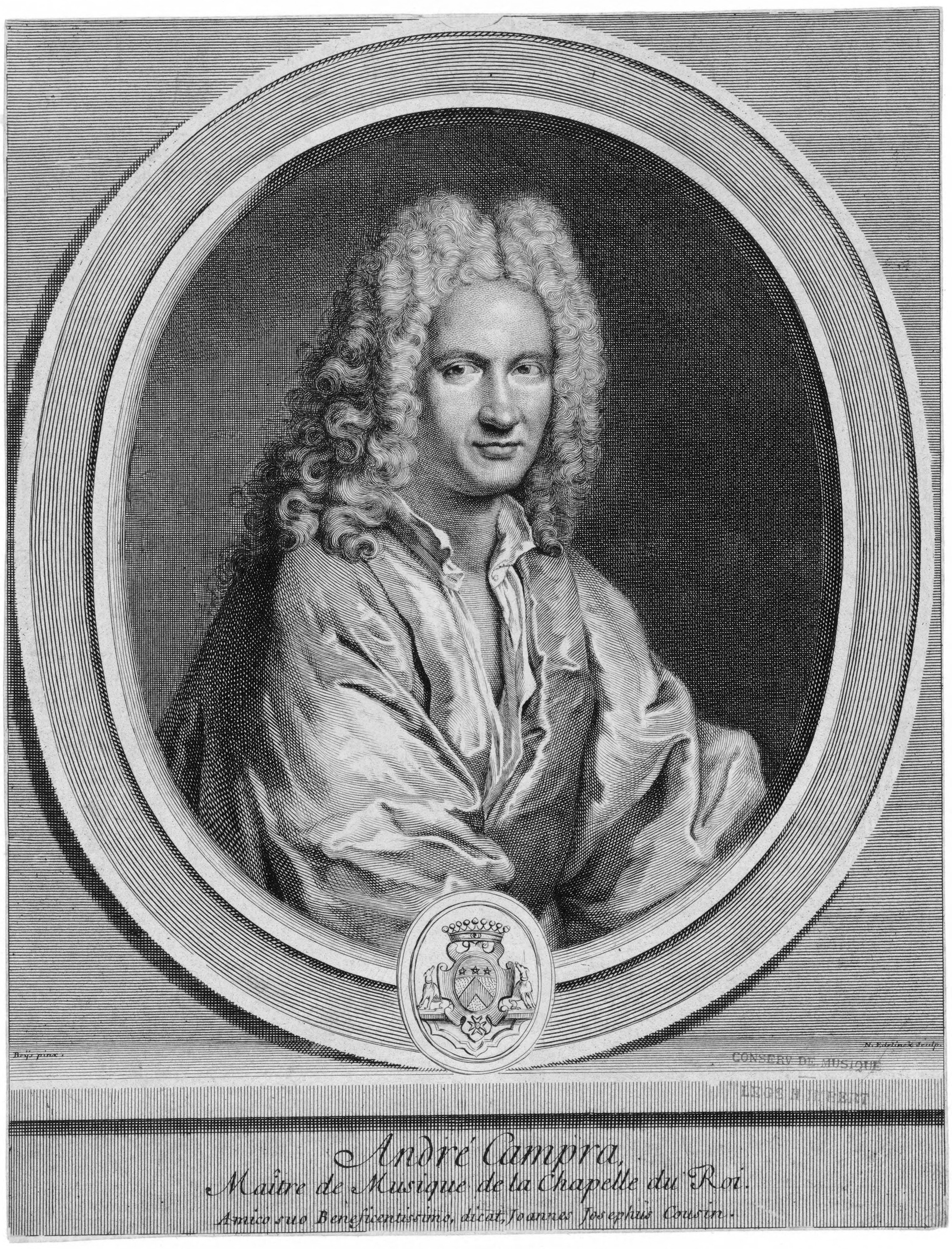
- 1725 portrait
- Born: December 4, 1660; Aix-en-Provence, France
- Died: June 29, 1744 (aged 83); Versailles, Yvelines, France
- Occupations: Composer, conductor

André Campra (French: [kɑ̃pʁa]; baptized 4 December 1660 – 29 June 1744) was a French composer and conductor of the Baroque era. The leading French opera composer in the period between Jean-Baptiste Lully and Jean-Philippe Rameau, Campra wrote several tragédies en musique and opéra-ballets that were extremely well received. He also wrote three books of cantatas as well as religious music, including a requiem.

== Biography ==
Campra was the son of Giovanni Francesco Campra, a surgeon and violinist from Graglia, Italy, and Louise Fabry, from Aix-en-Provence. His father was his first music teacher. He was baptised on 4 December 1660 in the Église de la Madeleine in Aix. He became a choirboy in the Cathédrale Saint-Sauveur there in 1674 and commenced ecclesiastical studies four years later. He was reprimanded by his superiors in 1681 for having taken part in theatrical performances without permission, but was nevertheless made a chaplain on 27 May of that year.

He served as maître de musique (music director) at the cathedrals of Arles and Toulouse and then, from 1694 to 1700, served in a similar capacity at the cathedral of Notre-Dame de Paris. André Campra introduced violins into the performance of sacred music at the Cathedral of Paris, an innovation that proved controversial at a time when the instrument was still associated with popular street music. In 1697 he began composing for the theatre, initially publishing some works under his brother’s name in order to safeguard his reputation with ecclesiastical authorities. He resigned his position at Notre-Dame in 1700 and thereafter devoted himself to theatrical composition, achieving considerable critical success. By 1705 he had attained such prominence as a composer that he became the subject of hostile commentary in the press. From 1720 onward, he restricted his activity to the composition of sacred music.

Although Campra had obtained critical success he lacked financial security. In 1722 he was engaged briefly as maître de musique by the Prince of Conti. After the death of the regent Philippe d'Orléans in December 1723, Campra became sous-maître at the Royal Chapel in Versailles. In 1730 he became the Inspecteur Général at the Opéra (Royal Academy of Music).

He died in Versailles on 29 June 1744 at the age of 83.

== Music and style ==
L'Europe galante (1697), which Campra wrote with librettist Antoine Houdar de la Motte, is often cited as the first opéra-ballet, as it was the first work of French opera to feature characters from the contemporary world rather than from mythology, as well as the first to employ comic intrigue as a part of the dramatic structure. L'Europe galante followed the structure of Pascale Colasse's Ballet des Saisons, which introduced the opéra-ballet structure by which each act contains an independent action but featured mythological (rather than contemporary) characters.

== Principal works ==
Stage works

- L'Europe galante, opéra-ballet (1697)
- Le carnaval de Venise, opéra-ballet (1699)
- Le Destin du Nouveau Siècle, opéra-ballet (1700)
- Hésione, tragédie en musique (1700)
- Aréthuse, opéra-ballet (1701)
- Tancrède, tragédie en musique (1702)
- Les muses, opéra-ballet (1703)
- Iphigénie en Tauride, tragédie en musique (1704)
- Télémaque, tragédie en musique pastiche (1704)
- Alcine, tragédie en musique (1705)
- Hippodamie, tragédie en musique (1708)
- Les fêtes vénitiennes, opéra-ballet (1710)
- Idoménée, tragédie en musique (1712)
- Télèphe, tragédie en musique (1713)
- Énée et Didon, fête musicale (1714)
- Camille, reine des volsques, tragédie en musique (1717)
- Les âges, opéra-ballet (1718)
- Achille et Déidamie, tragédie en musique (1735)

Cantatas

- Book I 1708 – Hebe. L'Heureux jaloux. Didon. Daphne. Arion. Les femmes.
- Book II 1714 – Les Heureux Epoux, Silène, Achille oisif, La Dispute de l'Amour et de l'Hymen, La danse de Flore, Enée et Didon.
- Book III 1728 – L'heureux moment, Les caprices de l'Amour, La colère d'Achille, Les plaisirs de la campagne, Le papillon, Le jaloux, Le lys et la rose

Sacred works

- Nisi Dominus (1722)
- Requiem (after 1723)
- Motets for the royal chapel (1723–1741)
- Te Deum

== Legacy ==
- Darius Milhaud based his 1936 orchestral work Suite provençale on 18th-century themes, including some by Campra.
- A theme from Campra's opera Camille, reine des Volsques (1717) was used as the basis of the collaborative work La guirlande de Campra, a set of variations created by seven French composers in 1952.
- The "Rigaudon" from his opera Idoménée, in an arrangement for organ, is probably his most familiar work, often used as a wedding processional and often recorded.
- The Collège Campra, a state-owned secondary school in the centre of Aix-en-Provence is named for him and houses a statue of him.
