= Jean Dun =

French opera singer

Jean Dun, also known as Jean Dun "père", (? – 1735) was a French opera singer active at the Paris Opéra where he created many bass roles during the late 17th and early 18th centuries. He was also the bass soloist at the church of Saint-Paul-Saint-Louis in Paris during the time Charpentier was the Master of Music there. His voice is described in contemporary sources as basse-taille, which is closer in quality to that of a modern baritone.

Little is known about his early life, but according to Casaglia, he appeared in the small role of Eutyro in the premiere of Francesco Cavalli's Ercole amante in 1662. By 1697, he was singing leading roles, sometimes creating as many as two or three in one opera, e.g. in the 1710 premiere of André Campra's opéra-ballet Les fêtes vénitiennes. In the course of his lengthy career he appeared in more than 37 operas. Dun retired from the stage in 1720 with a pension from the Paris Opéra, but from 1726 to 1734 he sang in the chorus there. He died in Paris the following year.

Two of Dun's children were also opera singers. His son, Jean Dun "fils" (died 1772), also sang leading bass roles with the Paris Opéra. Father and son appeared together in the 1718 premiere of Campra's Les âges. His daughter, who performed as "Mlle Dun", was much applauded for her voice and charming stage presence but performed for only five years at the Opéra before her early death in 1713.
