= François Colin de Blamont =

French composer (1690–1760)

François Colin de Blamont (22 November 1690 – 14 February 1760) was a French composer of the Baroque era.

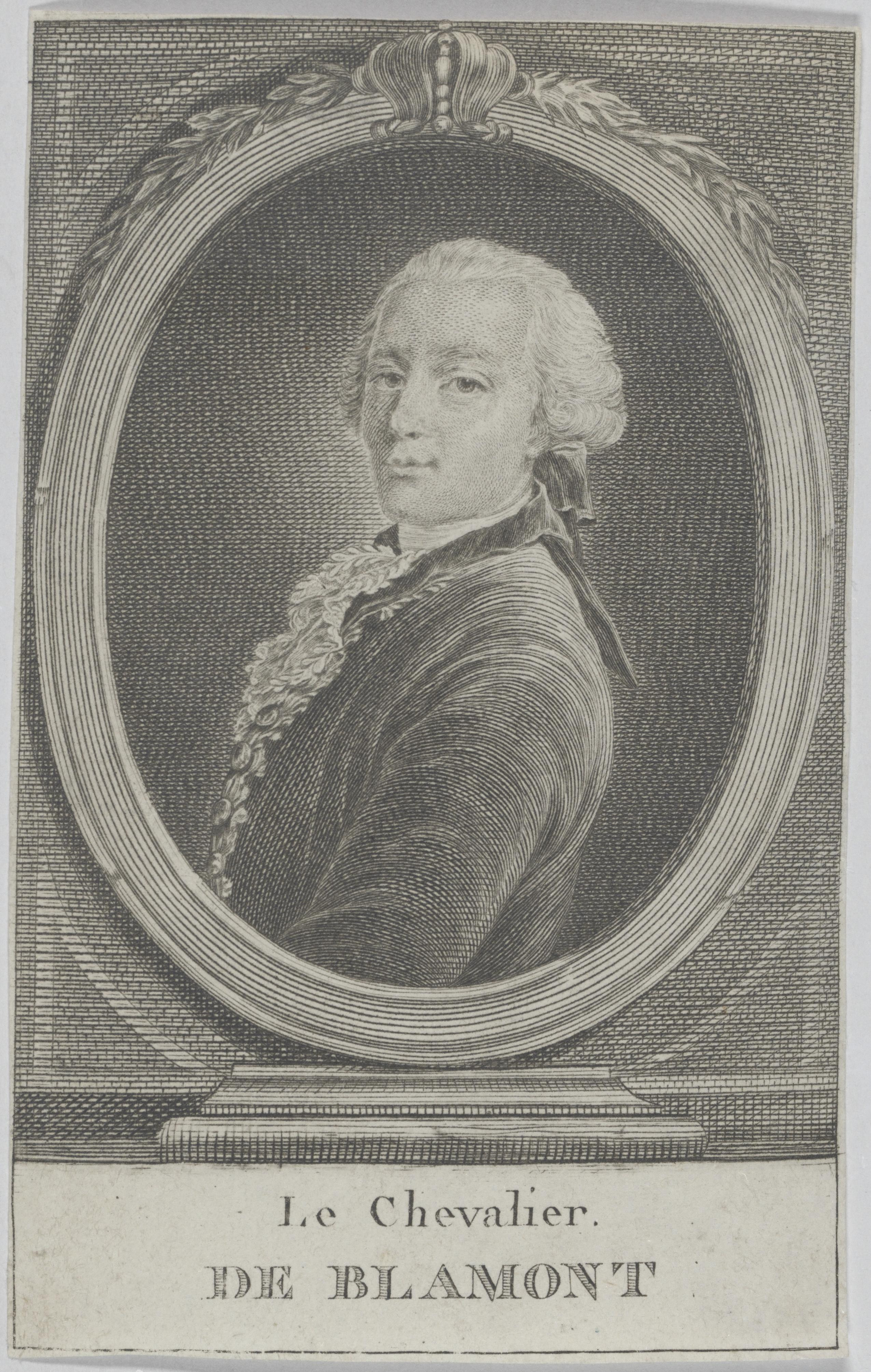
François Colin de Blamont

Born at Versailles as François Colin, he served as a royal musician and was eventually ennobled in 1750, his surname becoming Colin de Blamont. He was the protégé of Michel Richard Delalande and succeeded the latter as Master of the Chapelle Royale on his death in 1726. Blamont wrote motets and cantatas as well as stage works, including the opera Les fêtes grecques et romaines, intended to be the first in a new genre, the ballet héroïque, which would challenge the supremacy of the opéra-ballet.

== Sources ==
- Le magazine de l'opéra baroque by Jean-Claude-Brenac (in French)
