= François Rebel =

French composer

François Rebel (19 June 1701 – 7 November 1775) was a French composer of the Baroque era. Born in Paris, the son of the leading composer Jean-Féry Rebel, he was a child prodigy who became a violinist in the orchestra of the Paris Opera at the age of 13. As a composer he is best known for his close collaboration with François Francoeur (see that page for further details of their works).

== Selected recordings ==
- Zélindor, roi des Sylphes

== Sources ==
- The Viking Opera Guide ed. Holden (1993)
