= Anders J. Dahlin =

Swedish tenor (born 1975)

Anders J. Dahin
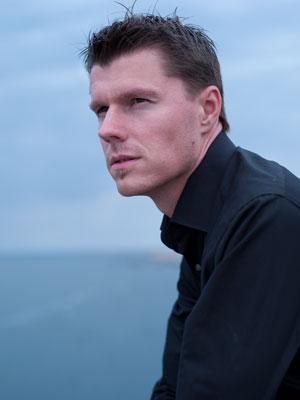
- Born: March 12, 1975 (age 50)
- Education: Musikkonservatoriet Falun; Norwegian Academy of Music; Royal Danish Academy of Music
- Occupation: Operatic tenor

Anders J. Dahlin (born March 12, 1975) is a Swedish tenor. He studied at the Music Conservatory Falun in Sweden, at the Norwegian Academy of Music in Oslo, and at the Royal Danish Academy of Music in Copenhagen.

== Music career ==
In 1998 he made his operatic debut at the Norwegian National Opera as Tom Wingfield in Antonio Bibalo's opera Die Glasmenagerie (after Tennessee Williams' The Glass Menagerie). In recent years he has become one of the leading interpreters of the early French Baroque music. He is a sought after Evangelist in J. S. Bach's passions and has worked over the years with conductors like John Eliot Gardiner, William Christie, Christophe Rousset, Emmanuelle Haïm, René Jacobs, Hervé Niquet, Marc Minkowski, Andreas Spering, Alexis Kossenko, Eric Ericson and François-Xavier Roth. Dahlin is the recipient of the Jussi Björling Award for 2014.

== Opera roles ==
F. Cavalli

- Gli amori d'Apollo e di Dafne, Apollo

J. P. Rameau

- Zoroastre, title role
- Platée, title role, Mercure. Thespis
- Les Indes galantes, Carlos, Tacmas, Valère, Damon
- Castor et Pollux, Castor, L'Atlète, Mercure
- Dardanus, title role

M. A Charpentier

- David et Jonathas H.490, David
- Medée H.491, Jason, Berger, Phantome, Corinthien

Campra

- Sémélé, Adraste
- L'Europe galante, Dom Pedro

Lully

- Roland, Insulaire, Coridon
- Armide, un amant fortuné

W. A Mozart

- Die Entführung aus dem Serail, Belmonte
- Così fan tutte, Ferrando
- Mitridate, Marzio

C. Monteverdi

- L'Orfeo, Pastore 1, Echo
- L'incoronazione di Poppea, Soldato 1, Lucano, Famigliare 1, Tribuno, Ottone, Nutrice
- Il ritorno d'Ulisse in patria, Telemaco, humana fragilità

H. Purcell

- The Fairy-Queen, Chinese man, Theseus
- King Arthur, various roles
- The Indian Queen, various roles

H. Demarets

- Vénus et Adonis

A. Bibalo

- The Glass Menagerie, Tom Wingfield

H. Hellstenius

- Sera. Abel
