= Marie Le Rochois =

French opera singer (c. 1658–1728)

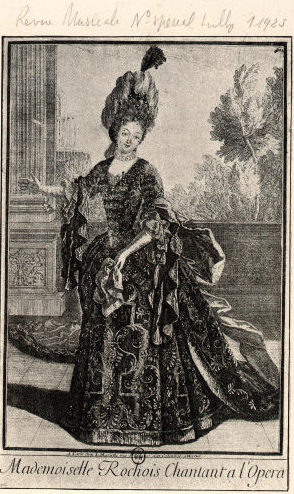
La Rochois

Marie Le Rochois (c. 1658 – 8 October 1728) was a French operatic soprano who belonged to the Académie Royale de Musique. She is often referred to as Marthe Le Rochois or simply La Rochois.

== Opera career ==
She was introduced to Jean-Baptiste Lully, possibly by his father-in-law Michel Lambert who may have been her teacher, and became a member of the Paris Opéra in 1678. She sang in operas by Lully, Pascal Collasse, Henri Desmarets, Marc-Antoine Charpentier, André Campra, Marin Marais, and André Cardinal Destouches but she was best regarded for her portrayal of Armide in Lully's opera.

This performance was not without its drama behind the scenes. Lully's biographer François-Joseph Fétis reports that shortly before the premiere, Rochois had become pregnant, and that when Lully found this out, he kicked her stomach until she miscarried.

Despite this, Rochois enjoyed more of a reputation for moral rectitude than some of her wilder colleagues at the opera such as Julie d'Aubigny and Fanchon Moreau. Less of a celebrity, she was perceived as more of an artist, as indicated by the number of important roles with which she was entrusted by Lully and his successors.

== Retirement ==
After retiring from the stage in 1698, she became a teacher, while remaining active in the contemporary arts social world. Her students included Marie Antier and Françoise Journet. She died in Paris in 1728.

== Roles created ==
- Arethusa in Lully's Proserpine (Paris, 1680)
- Merope in Lully's Persée (Paris, 1682)
- Arcabonne in Lully's Amadis (Paris, 1684)
- Angéligue in Lully's Roland (Paris, 1684)
- Armide in Lully's Armide (Paris, 1686)
- Galatée in Acis et Galatée (Paris, 1686)
- Polixène in the Lully-Collasse Achille et Polyxène (Paris, 1687)
- Thétis in Collasse's Thétis et Pélée (Paris, 1689)
- Lavinie in Collasse's Enée et Lavinie (Paris, 1690)
- The title role in Desmarets's Didon (Paris, 1693)
- The title role in Charpentier's Médée (Paris, 1693)
- Ariane in Marin Marais's Ariane et Bacchus (Paris, 1696)
- Vénus in Desmarets's Vénus et Adonis (Paris, 1697)
- The title role in Destouches's Issé (Paris, 1697)
- Roxane in Campra's L'Europe galante (Paris, 1697)
