= Louis-Guillaume Pécour =

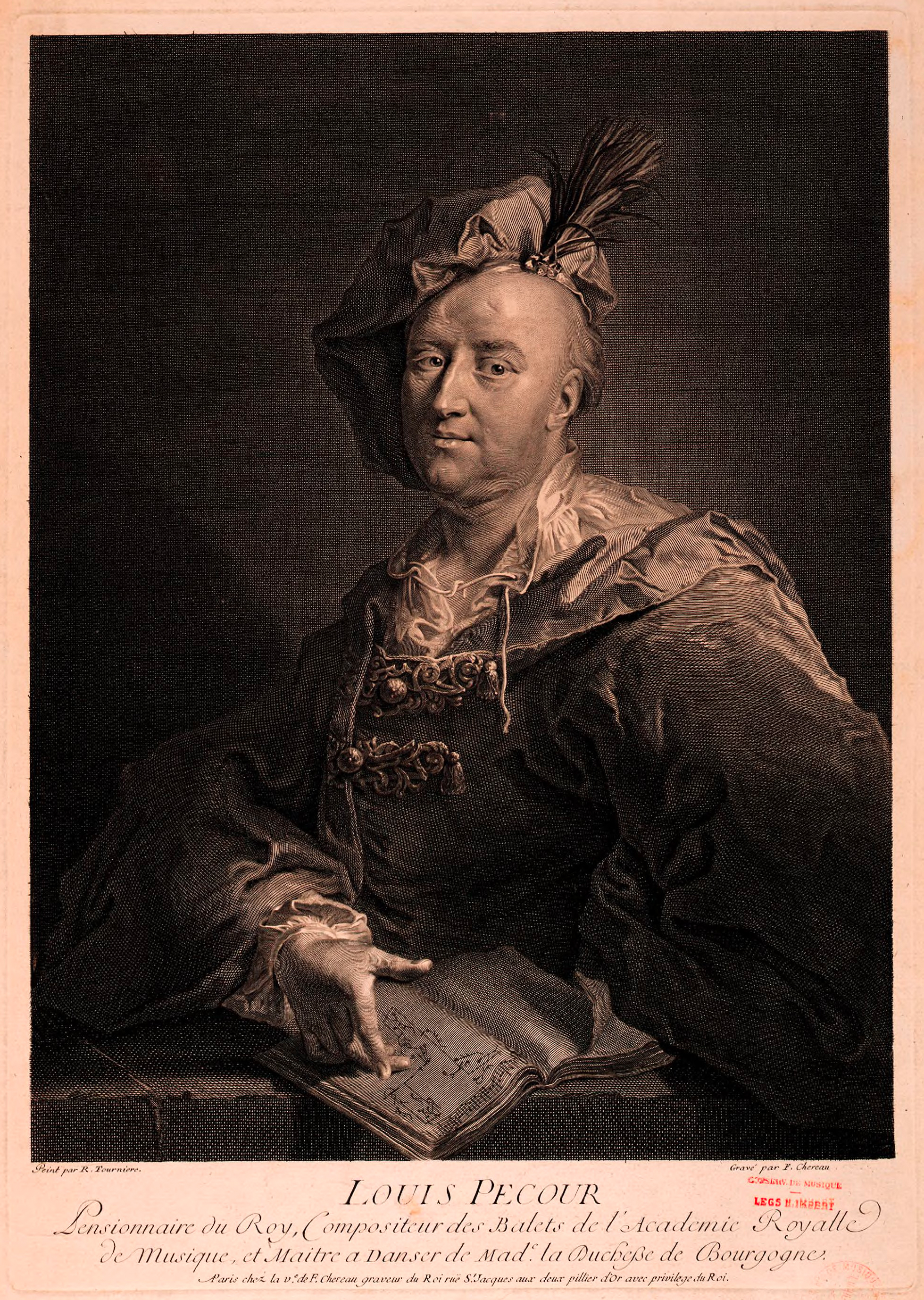
Louis Pécour

Louis Pécour (also spelled Pecoor, Pecour, Pécourt; 10 August 1653 – 12 April 1729) was a French dancer and choreographer. He is most well known for his work with the Académie Royale de Musique (the name of the Paris Opera at the time).

== Biography ==
Born Guillaume-Louis Pecour in Paris, he was the son of Jacques Pecour, a royal courier, and Marie Voisin (or Raisin), who lived in the rue des Petits-Champs.

He studied dance with Pierre Beauchamps, and likely made his debut in January 1671, as one of eight Zephyrs in the third intermezzo of Psyché at the theatre of the royal court in the Tuileries Palace.

He first danced at the Paris Opera in 1674 in Jean-Baptiste Lully's Cadmus et Hermione. Pécour performed as a principal dancer, both at the Opera's Théâtre du Palais-Royal in Paris and for the royal court at the Château de Saint-Germain-en-Laye and Château de Chantilly, and created many dance parts in works by Lully, including the ballet Le triomphe de l'amour (1681), the opera Persée (1682, as premier danseur opposite Mlle Lafontaine), the opera Amadis (1684), the ballet Le temple de la paix (1685), and the opera Armide (1686).

According to the Parfaict brothers in their history of the Paris Opera, "he was handsome, well-built, and danced with the noblest air possible." A letter about the Ballet des Saisons (26 October 1695) claims that "the first and second boxes were redoubled, one could have perished in the pit, and people were on each other's laps in the Paradis, all because of Pécour, who danced a Spanish sarabande.... [H]e dances like a master."

After the death of the Opera's director Lully in 1687, the company's ballet master Pierre Beauchamps retired, and Pécour succeeded him, creating choreography for ballets at the Opera, as well as for the royal court. He mostly retired as a dancer around 1704 and received a pension in 1705, but his name appears on programs as a dancer in 1709 and 1710, and he continued to choreograph ballets at the Opera until his death in 1729. He mostly created ballets in operas, including ones by Pascal Collasse, Henri Desmarets, and Toussaint Bertin de la Doué and choreographed André Campra's first opéra-ballet L'Europe galante in 1697, as well as his Le carnaval de Venise (1699), Hésione (1700), Tancrède (1702), and Les fêtes vénitiennes (1710).

Over 100 of Pécour's ballets have been preserved in Feuillet notation, and they were danced at other royal courts, helping to spread the French style of dancing all over Europe. He was probably the first dance choreographer to have such wide influence.

Pécour was listed as a member of the Académie Royale de Danse in 1695, when Beauchamps was its director, and in 1719, when Claude Ballon was director.

Pécour died in Paris and was buried in the church of Saint Roche.
