= Achille et Polyxène =

Opera by Jean-Baptiste Lully and Pascal Collasse

- Unfinished opera by Jean-Baptiste Lully completed by Pascal Collasse
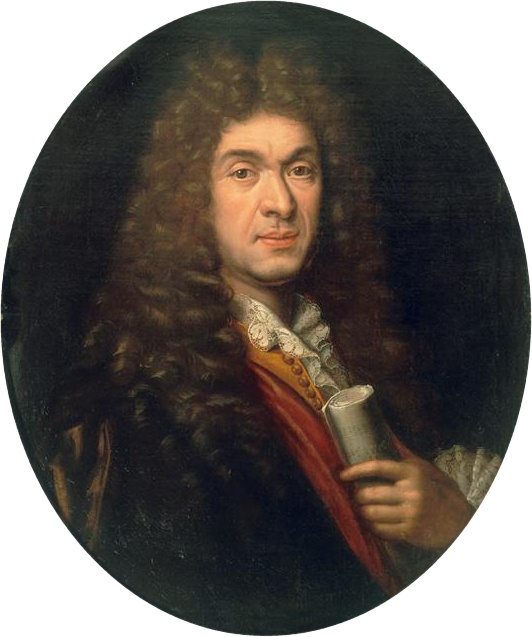
- Portrait of Jean-Baptiste Lully
- Librettist: Jean Galbert de Campistron
- Language: French
- Based on: Virgil's Aeneid
- Premiere: 7 November 1687; Theatre in the Palais-Royal, Paris

Achille et Polyxène (Achilles and Polyxena) is a tragédie lyrique containing a prologue and five acts based on Virgil's Aeneid with a French libretto by Jean Galbert de Campistron. The opera's overture and first act were composed by Jean-Baptiste Lully, who died from a conducting injury before he could complete the score. The prologue and the remaining acts are the work of his pupil Pascal Collasse who finished the work, eight months after Lully's death on 22 March 1687. Acts 1 and 4 of the ballet was created by Louis Lestang, and the ballet to the prologue and acts 2 and 3 were by Louis-Guillaume Pécour. The opera was first performed on 7 November 1687, by the Paris Opera at the Théâtre du Palais-Royal in Paris.

== Analysis of the libretto and music ==
The libretto for this opera differs from those of Lully's earlier works with Philippe Quinault. Typically, Lully would begin his operas with a lively prologue, but this work has a somber prologue in which the Muses lament the king's desire for military expansion. Another difference is the tragic and somber ending of this opera in Act V. Lully usually ended his operas with a rousing ensemble number but this opera closes with the suicide of the heroine. The end of Act IV, the wedding scene, does contain a vibrant ensemble number at its close which would be more in keeping with a typical finale of one of Lully's operas.

== Roles ==
Cast	Voice type	Premiere, 7 November 1687 (Conductor: - )
Achille	haute-contre	Louis Gaulard Dumesny
Agamemnon	bass	Jean Dun
Priam	bass	François Beaumavielle
Andromaque	soprano	Fanchon Moreau or Louison Moreau?
Polixène	soprano	Marie le Rochois
Briséis	soprano	Marie-Louise Desmatins

== Plot ==
The Prologue is set in "A place once designed for spectacle, now only a shell of its former self." Mercure, messenger of the Gods, questions the Muses to find out why their spirits are downcast. Melpomene replies that the king (i.e. Louis XIV), in his desire for conquest, has plunged the country into war and ignored the Muses and their feasts. The other Muses agree and add: "he does not approve of anything we do; we are not worthy in his eyes." Mercure interrupts and insists that they put aside worry and concentrate on the charming spectacle to be performed before them. The scene is transformed, "as though its former glory had been restored." The Muses agree to pay careful attention to the forthcoming play and to try especially hard to enjoy it despite their misgivings. Jupiter descends and urges their particular contemplation of the Greek hero, Achille. The Muses agree and await the tale of the invincible Achille and his famous battles.

Act I opens on the Isle of Tenedos, Achille's refuge after a quarrel with Agamemnon. Patrocle asks Achille if Hector's bravery in past battles has made him jealous. Achille responds that only the losses sustained by the Greeks give him pleasure: Agamemnon, king of the Greeks, is the focus of his rage. In a rousing aria ("Je cours asseurer ma memoire"), Patrocle declares that he will defeat Hector. Achille, though concerned for his friend's safety, agrees, saying, "if your heart is strong, so too will be your arms." After Patrocle exits, Achille, left alone, entreats the gods to protect his friend in a moving soliloquy. Diomede approaches and announces that without Achille's help, the Greeks will not overcome the Trojans. Achille insists that he is happy here, out of contact with the quarrelsome Greeks. Diomede chastises the hero, suggesting that his bravery is shallow and that he loves vain pleasure. Venus and the Graces, descending from the heavens, remind Achille of the pleasure he experienced with them when he was not in battle. The act concludes as Arcas rushes in to announce that Patrocle is dead. Achille swears vengeance on Hector in an impassioned aria ("Manes de ce Guerrier, dont je pleure le sort").

Act II takes place in a Greek camp on the eve of battle with the Trojans. Diomede is certain that, with Achille's help, the Greeks under Agamemnon will be victorious. Agamemnon remains uncertain and, seeing the advancing Achille, decides to move back. A chorus of soldiers sing the praises of the victorious Achille. Arcas assures the Trojan prisoners that Achille is not without compassion--hope should replace their fears. King Priam of Troy, his daughter Polixene and his daughter-in-law Andromaque conspire to soften Achille's heart. Each appeals to Achille with stories of their losses suffered in the war with Greece. But it is the beautiful Polixene who breaks Achille's heart with her moving aria, "Vous le sçavez, Dieux que j'atteste!" The great warrior pledges eternal peace with the Greeks.

The Act III curtain rises on Achille's camp. Achille confesses his love for Polixene to Arcas, who reminds the hero that his original intent was to avenge their dead friend Patrocle. Achille counters that it is only Hector who deserves his wrath; the rest of the Trojans are not to blame. Agamemnon enters and also questions Achille's allegiance. Achille reminds him that it is for Patrocle, not the Greeks, that he engaged the Trojans. Agamemnon, realizing that Achille has fallen in love with the enemy princess, introduces the great hero to Briseis, a Greek princess whom he hopes will win Achille back to the side of the Greeks. Briseis confides to Achille the story of her capture and the loss of all she loved. Achille, as gallantly as possible, explains that he cannot love her. Furious, Briseis calls on the goddess Juno to avenge her broken heart. Juno accepts and promises that before the day is over, Briseis will see the result of her request. The act concludes with a chorus of shepherds offering thanks for the peace established by the "generous conqueror."

Priam's Palace provides the setting for Act IV. Polixene, alone and confused, questions the wisdom of marrying Achille, so recently the enemy of her people. She resigns herself to the inevitable, however, and awaits the ceremony. Andromaque, recognizing Polixene's despair, tries to comfort the bride-to-be, swearing "I will make my fidelity [to you] as famous as his [Achille's] glory." Priam enters and calls for his subjects to begin the wedding celebrations. Choirs of Trojans sing the praises of the beautiful princess and the heroic conqueror.

Act V takes place in Apollo's temple. As the Act opens, Achille asks his new bride why she turns away from him when he approaches. She replies, "the more I see you, the more I am troubled." Priam enters before the troops of Greeks and Trojans and commands that everyone, for the sake of peace, should surrender himself to love. He charges the lovers to swear an oath of tender and devoted love. Briseis is beside herself with anger when she witnesses the marriage of Achille and Polixene. She demands to know why Juno has not exacted revenge. The chorus of Greeks warn Achille to flee a certain death. He is struck down and Arcas rushes to his side, blaming the Trojan Paris for the treasonous act. Briseis allies herself with Polixene and swears that she will lead the forces to avenge Achille's death. Polixene sends everyone away, and, in "C'en est fait," a grief-stricken soliloquy, declares that she is unable to live without her husband. The opera ends with her suicide.

== Recordings ==
To date, this opera has not yet been recorded, although individual selections have been recorded by various artists.

== Sources ==
- The New Grove French Baroque Masters (Macmillan, 1986): article on Lully by Graham Sadler
- The Viking Opera Guide ed. Holden (Viking, 1993)
- Le magazine de l'opéra baroque by Jean-Claude Brenac (in French)
- Casaglia, Gherardo (2005)."Achille et Polyxène, 7 November 1687". L'Almanacco di Gherardo Casaglia (in Italian).
