= Fanchon Moreau =

French opera singer (1668 – after 1743)

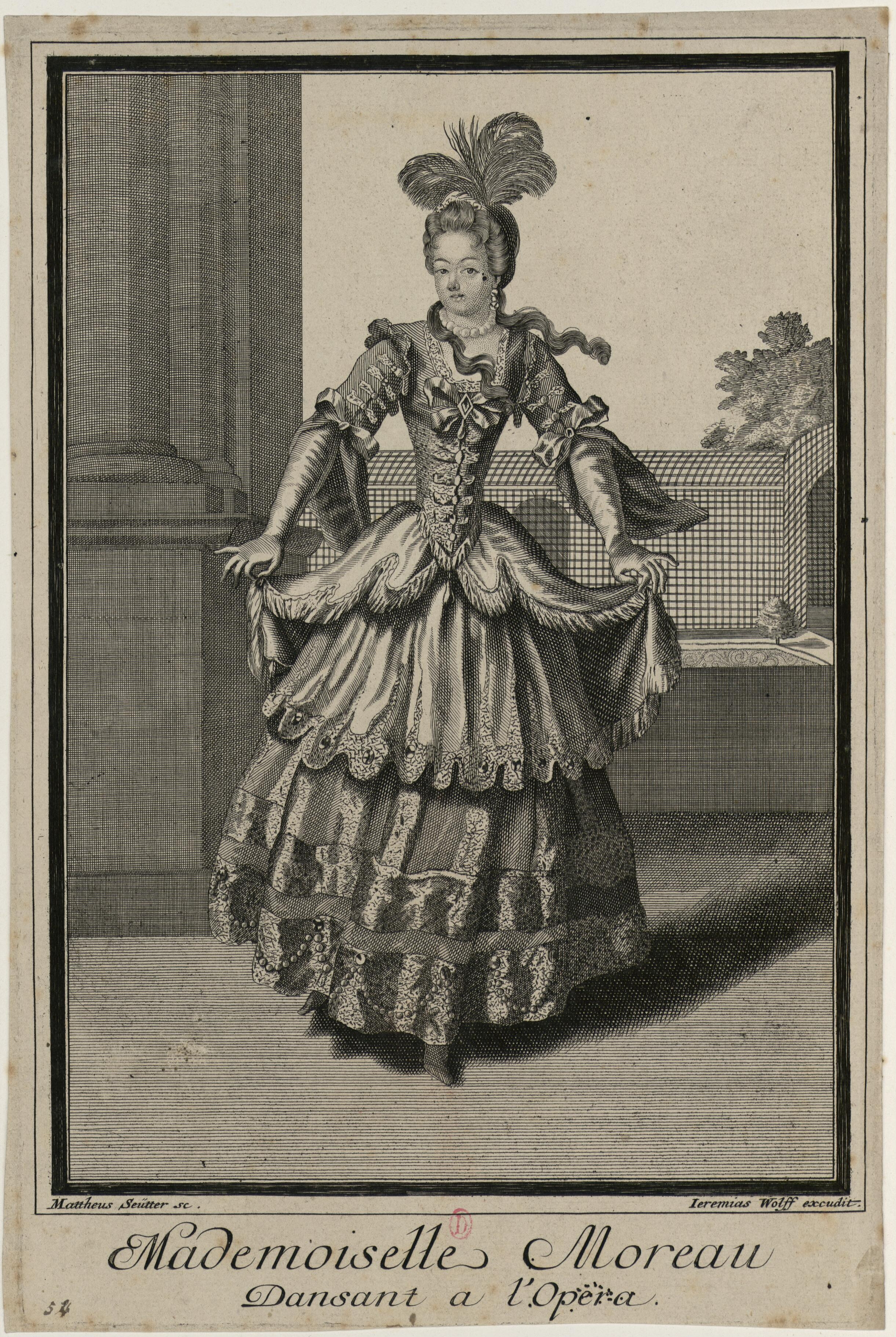
Engraving, circa early 18th century.

Françoise 'Fanchon' Moreau (1668 – 1754) was a French operatic soprano who belonged to the Académie Royale de Musique, also a celebrated beauty who was a favourite of the Great Dauphin.

== Opera career ==
Following her older sister Louison Moreau, Fanchon made her debut at the Paris Opéra in 1683 in the prologue of Phaëton by Lully, probably playing the role of Astrée. She remained with the company until at least 1702. Her sister stayed until 1692, during which period both sisters were referred to as Mlle Moreau, which sometimes makes it difficult to determine who sang what. She sang in operas by Lully, Campra, Charpentier, Destouches, Collasse, Desmarets, and Theobaldo Gatti including many premieres.

== Roles created ==
- Astrée (?) in Lully's Phaëton (Paris, 1683)
- Oriane in Lully's Amadis (Paris, 1684)
- Sidonie in Lully's Armide (Paris, 1686)
- Anne in Henri Desmarets's Didon (Paris, 1693)
- Créuse in Charpentier's Médée (Paris, 1693)
- Doris in Destouches's Issé (Paris, 1697)
- Olympia in Campra's L'Europe galante (Paris, 1697)
- The title role of Campra's Hésione (Paris, 1700)

== Celebrity ==
Like her sister, Fanchon received the attentions of Louis, the Great Dauphin. Julie d'Aubigny, the swordswoman and opera singer known as La Maupin, also fell in love with her and tried to commit suicide when she was rejected. Fanchon later became the long-term mistress of Philippe de Vendôme, fourth Duke of Vendôme.

Fanchon's colourful love life was referred to in François Couperin's La femme entre deux draps and was also the subject of his harpsichord composition La tendre Fanchon.

== Sources ==
- Anthony, James R (1992), 'Moreau, Fanchon' in The New Grove Dictionary of Opera, ed. Stanley Sadie (London) ISBN 0-333-73432-7
