= Idoménée =

1712 opera by André Campra

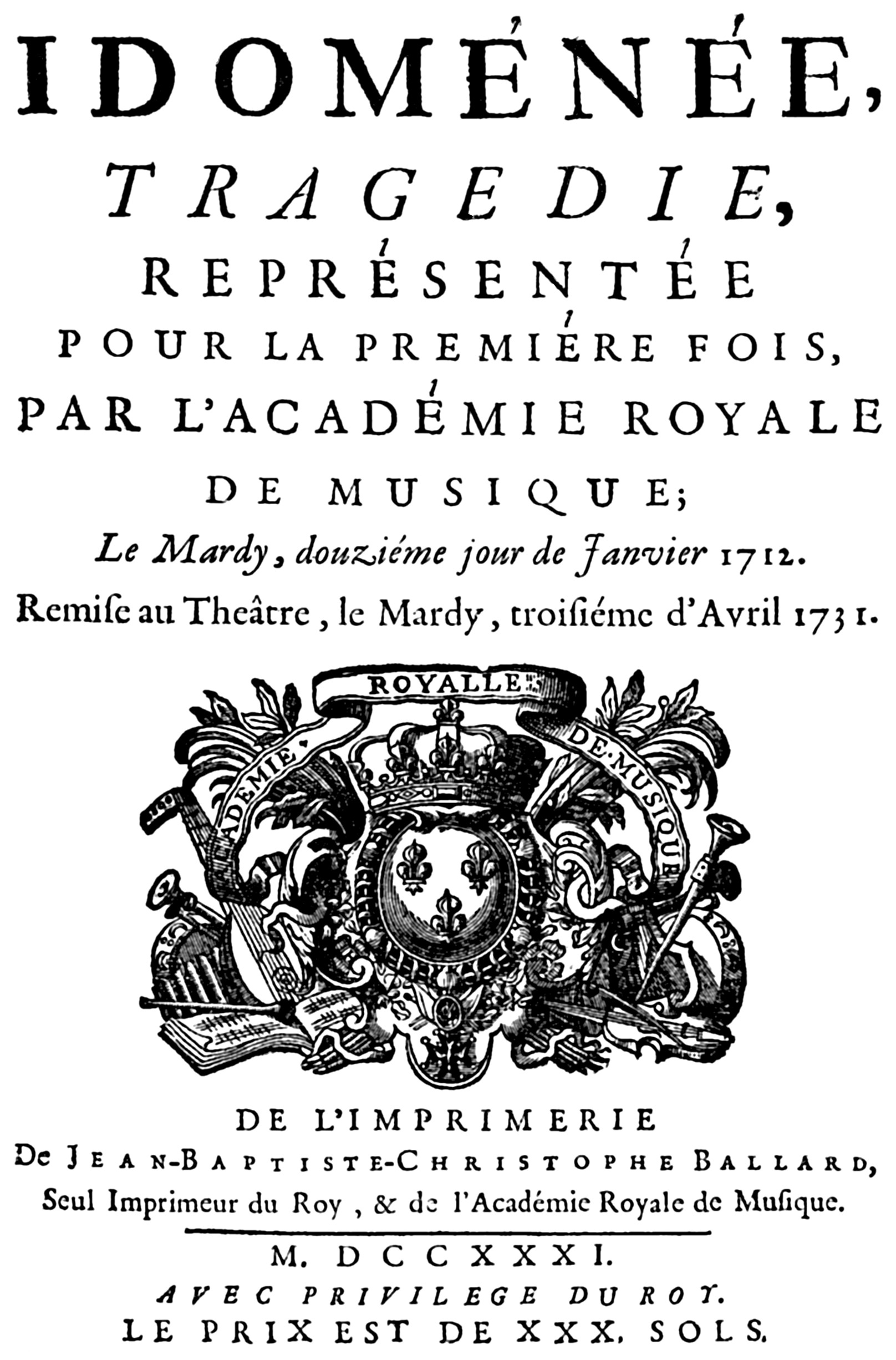
Title page of the original libretto

Idoménée (English: Idomeneus) is an opera by the French composer André Campra. It takes the form of a tragédie en musique in a prologue and five acts. Idoménée was first performed on 12 January 1712 by the Académie royale de musique at the Théâtre du Palais-Royal in Paris. The libretto, by Antoine Danchet, is based on a stage play by Crébillon père. It later formed the basis of Giambattista Varesco's libretto for Wolfgang Amadeus Mozart's opera Idomeneo.

== Roles ==
Roles, voice types, premiere cast
Role	Voice type	Premiere cast, 12 January 1712
Idoménée	bass-baritone	Gabriel-Vincent Thévenard
Eole/Arbas	bass-baritone	Charles Hardouin
Idamante	haute-contre	Jacques Cochereau
Ilione	soprano	Françoise Journet
Arcas	haute-contre	Jean-Baptiste Buseau
Dircé	soprano	Marie Antier
Neptune/High sacrificer of Neptune	bass-baritone	Jean Dun 'père'
Two sacrificers	haute-contre; taille (baritenor)	Robert Lebel; M Deshayes
Electre	soprano	Mlle Pestel
Vénus	soprano	Marie-Catherine Poussin
A follower of Vénus	soprano	Mlle Loignon
Two sea divinities/Two sheperdesses	sopranos	Mlles Delaurier and Terlet
Protée	bass-baritone	M Drot
La Jalousie/Némésis (travesti)	taille (baritenor)	Louis Mantienne
A woman from Crete	soprano	Mlle Linbour
Another shepherdess	soprano	Mlle Dekerkof

== Synopsis ==
- Prologue Vénus visits Eole (Aeolus) in his cavern to ask him to release the winds so she can punish the Greek hero Idoménée (Idomeneus), on his way back from the siege of Troy to his home in Crete.
- Act 1: In Crete, Ilione, daughter of King Priam of Troy reveals she has rejected the advances of Idoménée, but is secretly in love with his son Idamante. He returns her love, spurning Electre, who jealously plots revenge. News arrives that Idoménée has been lost in a storm at sea.
- Act 2: Idoménee has been shipwrecked but, thanks to the god Neptune, he has survived. He reveals he owes his life to the promise he made to Neptune to sacrifice the first person he should meet on the Cretan shore. To his horror, that person is his own son Idamante.
- Act 3: Idoménée has learnt of the love between Ilione and Idamante and is torn between a desire to save his son and jealousy. He orders Idamante to take Electre back to her homeland but as the ship is ready to depart a huge sea monster blocks its way. Neptune is determined to keep Idoménée to his vow.
- Act 4: Ilione tells Idamante of Idoménée's love for her. At the temple of Neptune, Idoménée implores the god to release him from his promise. Idamante fights and kills the sea monster.
- Act 5: Idoménée announces that he will leave the throne and Ilione to Idamante. But the gods' anger is not yet appeased. They send Idoménée insane and in his fury he mistakenly kills his own son.

== Scoring ==
The 1712 version is scored for flute, oboe, bassoon, and strings.

== Recordings ==
- Idoménée (1731 version) Bernard Deletré, Sandrine Piau, Jean-Paul Fouchécourt, Les Arts Florissants conducted by William Christie (Harmonia Mundi, 1991)
