= Marie-Louise Desmatins =

French opera singer

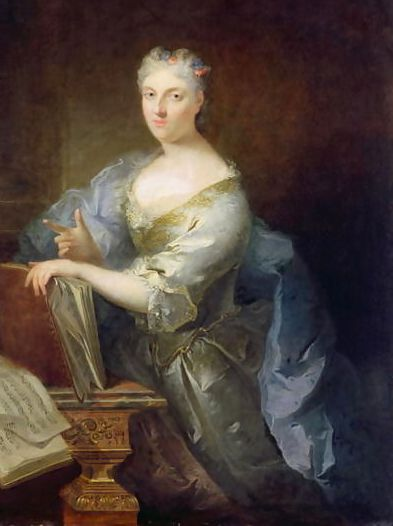
Portrait of Marie-Louise Desmatins by Robert Tournières

Marie-Louise Desmatins (fl. 1682–1708) was a French soprano and creator of many roles in French Baroque opera.

She performed in Jean Baptiste Lully's Persée (1682), Armide (1686 and 1703 revival), Achille et Polyxène (1687), Thésée (1698 revival), Isis (1704 revival), Roland (1705 revival), Bellérophon (1705 revival), Alceste (1706 revival), as well as in Pascal Collasse's Enée et Lavinie (1690) and Thétis et Pélée (1699 revival), André Cardinal Destouches' Issé (1697), Henri Desmarets' Didon (1704 revival), André Campra's Iphigénie en Tauride (1704), and Marin Marais' Alcyone (1706).

The absence of her name in subsequent cast lists remained unexplained until 2007, when a report on the novel La Musique du Diable (1711) confirmed her death. A satirical narrative of Desmatins' afterlife in Hades, the novel suggests that she died of complications of a primitive form of liposuction.

An extant portrait of her was painted by Robert Le Vrac de Tournières.
