= Hésione =

1700 opera by André Campra with libretto by Antoine Danchet

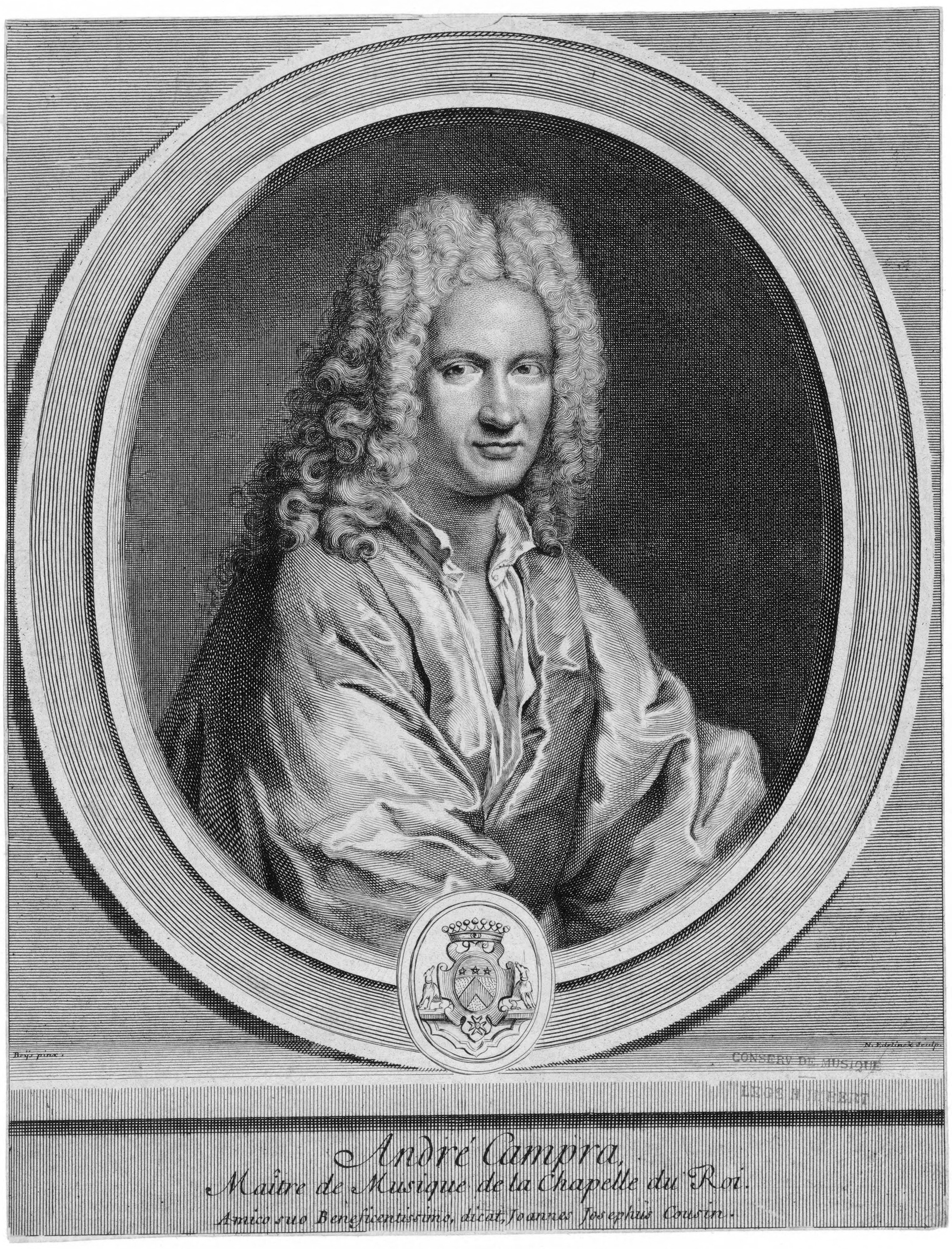
André Campra

Hésione (English: Hesione) is an opera by the French composer André Campra. It takes the form of a tragédie en musique in a prologue and five acts. The libretto, by Antoine Danchet, is based on the Greek myth of Hesione and Laomedon.

== Performance history ==
Hésione was first performed on 21 December 1700 by the Académie royale de musique in the Salle du Palais-Royal in Paris. The opera was a great success at its premiere.

== Roles ==
- The Priestess of the Sun (Prologue), a priestess of Flora, mezzo-soprano, Julie d'Aubigny
- The Sun (Prologue), Laomédon, baritone, Charles Hardouin
- Anchise, bass-baritone, Gabriel-Vincent Thévenard
- Hésione, soprano, Fanchon Moreau
- Vénus, soprano, Marie-Louise Desmatins
- Télamon, haute-contre, Pierre Chopelet
- Cléon, Neptune, bass-baritone, Jean Dun
- A Grace, Mlle Heusé
- 'A pleasure', haute-contre, Jean Boutelou

== Synopsis ==
- Prologue A depiction of celebrations of the Sun in an amphitheatre in ancient Rome.
- Act One Télamon (Telamon), King of Salamis, is unhappy that the princess Hésione (Hesione) prefers the love of his rival Anchise (Anchises). Vénus (Venus, the goddess of love) comes to his aid and says she will separate Anchise and Hésione. An oracle announces that Anchise must travel to Mount Ida to learn the will of the gods.
- Act Two On Mount Ida, Vénus appears to Anchise and tries to win his love, but in spite of the charming divertissement she puts on for him, Anchise rejects her. She decides to take her revenge on Hésione.
- Act Three Hésione, believing Anchise has fallen in love with Vénus, is wracked with jealousy.
- Act Four Vénus conjures a vision of Hésione and Télamon together which makes Anchise jealous. But the two discover the goddess' illusion and are reconciled. Meanwhile, the god Neptune is angry with Hésione's father, Laomédon (Laomedon), King of Troy, and destroys the walls of his city. He also sends a sea monster which Télamon promises to vanquish providing he is given Hésione's hand in marriage as a reward.
- Act Five Anchise tries to kill the sea monster too but it is invincible. Vénus explains to him that she has arranged that only Télamon will be able to defeat it and so win Hésione. The Trojans celebrate Télamon's victory and his betrothal to the princess. Anchise curses them and predicts Troy's final destruction. The gods award Anchise to Vénus, who has her Zephyrs carry him off for herself.

== Sources ==
- Casaglia, Gherardo (2005)."Hésione, 21 December 1700". L'Almanacco di Gherardo Casaglia (in Italian).
- The Viking Opera Guide ed. Holden (Viking, 1993)
- Le magazine de l'opéra baroque
