= Iphigénie en Tauride (Desmarets and Campra) =

Opera by Henri Desmarets and André Campra

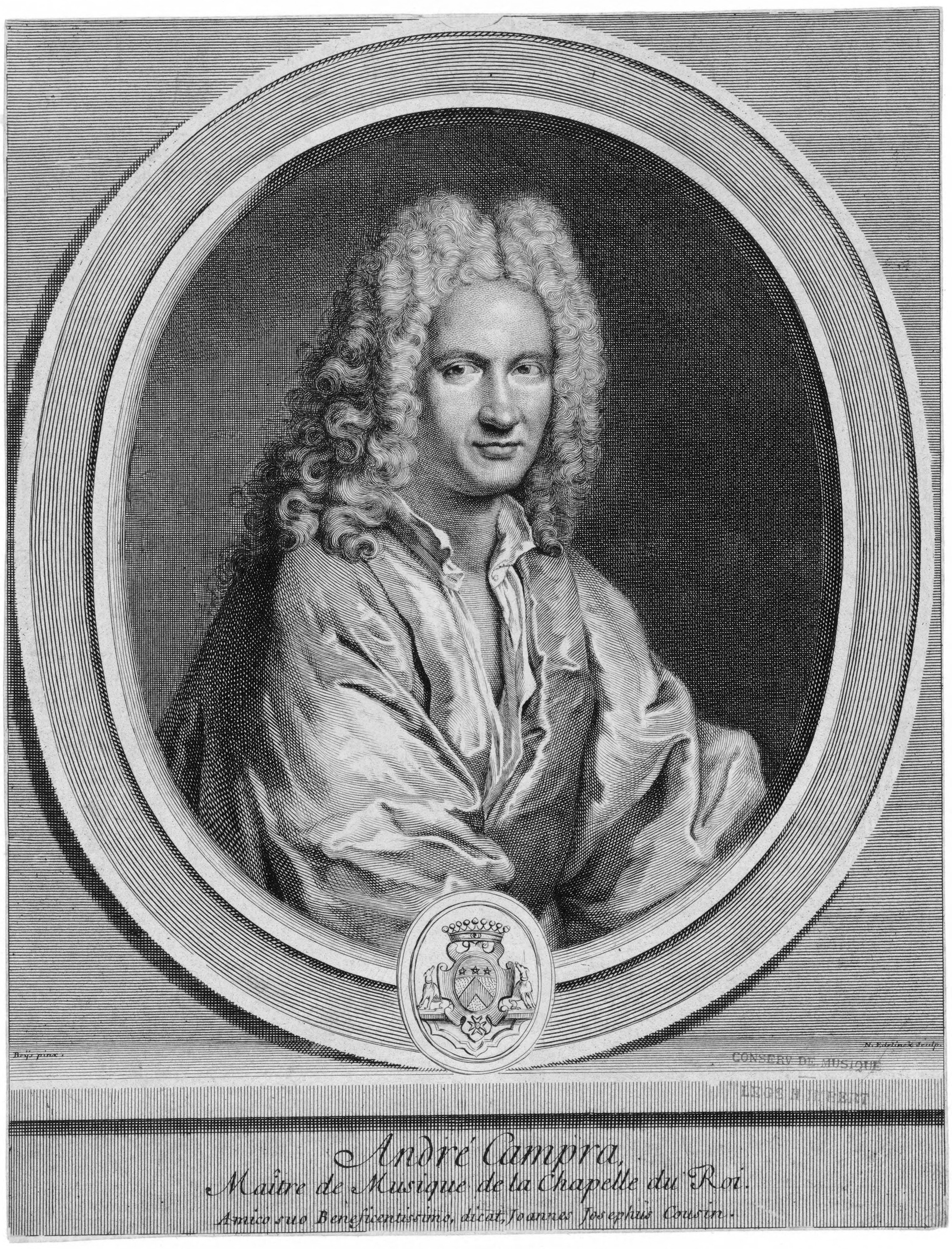
André Campra

Iphigénie en Tauride (English: Iphigeneia in Tauris) is an opera by the French composers Henri Desmarets and André Campra. It takes the form of a tragédie en musique in a prologue and five acts. The libretto is by Joseph-François Duché de Vancy with additions by Antoine Danchet. Desmarets had begun work on the opera around 1696 but abandoned it when he was forced to go into exile in 1699. Campra and his regular librettist Danchet took up the piece and wrote the prologue, most of Act Five, two arias in Act One, an aria for Acts Two and Three, and two arias for the fourth act. The plot is ultimately based on Euripides' tragedy Iphigeneia in Tauris.

== Performance history ==
Iphigénie was first performed by the Académie royale de musique at the Théâtre du Palais-Royal in Paris on 6 May 1704 with Françoise Journet as Iphigénie and Gabriel-Vincent Thévenard as Oreste. It was coolly received at first, but enjoyed several revivals in the 18th century, the last being in 1762.

== Roles ==
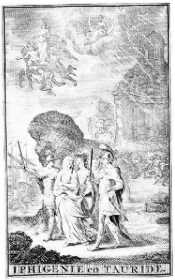
Cover of the original libretto of Iphigenie en Tauride (1696)

Role	Voice type	Premiere cast, 6 May 1704
L'ordonnateur des jeux/L'Océan	basse-taille (bass-baritone)	Charles Hardouin
Diane	dessus (soprano)	Julie d'Aubigny, known as La Maupin
Un habitant de Délos	haute-contre	Jean Boutelou
Iphigénie	dessus	Mlle Desmatins
Électre	dessus	Mlle Armand
Oreste	basse-taille	Gabriel-Vincent Thévenard
Pylade	haute-contre	M Poussin
Triton	haute-contre	Pierre Chopelet
Thoas	bass	Jean Dun (père)
Isménide/Seconde habitante de Délos	dessus	Mlle Bataille
Le grand sacrificateur	taille (baritenor)	Louis Mantienne
Première habitante de Délos/Première numphe	dessus	Mlle Dupérey
Seconde nymphe	dessus	Mlle d'Humé

== Recordings ==
Complete recording (2025): Veronique Gens (Iphigénie), Reinoud Van Mechelen (Pylade), Thomas Dolie (Oreste), David Witczak (Thoas), Olivia Doray (Électre), Floriane Hasler (Diane), Tomislav Lavoie (L'ordonnateur des jeux/L'Océan), Antonin Rondepierre (Un habitant de Délos/Triton/Le grand sacrificateur), Jehanne Amzal (Isménide/Première habitante de Délos/Première nymphe), Marine Lafdal-Franc (Seconde habitante de Délos/Seconde nymphe/Seconde prêtresse); Le Concert Spirituel, Herve Niquet; 2 CDs α (Alpha-Classic.com) - ALPHA1106
