= Françoise Journet =

French operatic soprano

Françoise Journet (b. 1675, Lyon – d. 1720, Paris)< was a French operatic soprano.

Beginning her career at the Lyon Opera, Journet eventually became a pupil of Marie Le Rochois in Paris. In 1699 she appeared as Mélisse in the premiere of Amadis de Gréce by Destouches and subsequently created a number of important roles in operas by Marin Marais and Campra. She also sang in revivals of the operas of Lully and others. Her successor, in many of her roles, was Marie Antier.

A full-length portrait of Journet as Iphigénie was painted by Jean Raoux.

== Roles created ==
- Mélisse in André Cardinal Destouches's Amadis de Gréce (Paris, 1699)
- The title role in André Campra's Iphigénie en Tauride (Paris, 1704)
- The title role in Marin Marais's Sémélé (Paris, 1709)
- Isabelle in Campra's Les fêtes vénitiennes (Paris, 1710)
- The title role in Destouches's Callirhoé (Paris, 1712)
- Ilione in Campra's Idoménée (Paris, 1712)

== Sources ==
- Weller, Philip (1992), 'Journet, Françoise' in The New Grove Dictionary of Opera, ed. Stanley Sadie (London) ISBN 0-333-73432-7
- Butin, Jean (2000), Ces Lyonnaises qui ont marqué leur temps, Editions Lyonnaises d'Art et d'Histoire (Lyon) ISBN 2 84147 092 X
