= Issé (opera) =

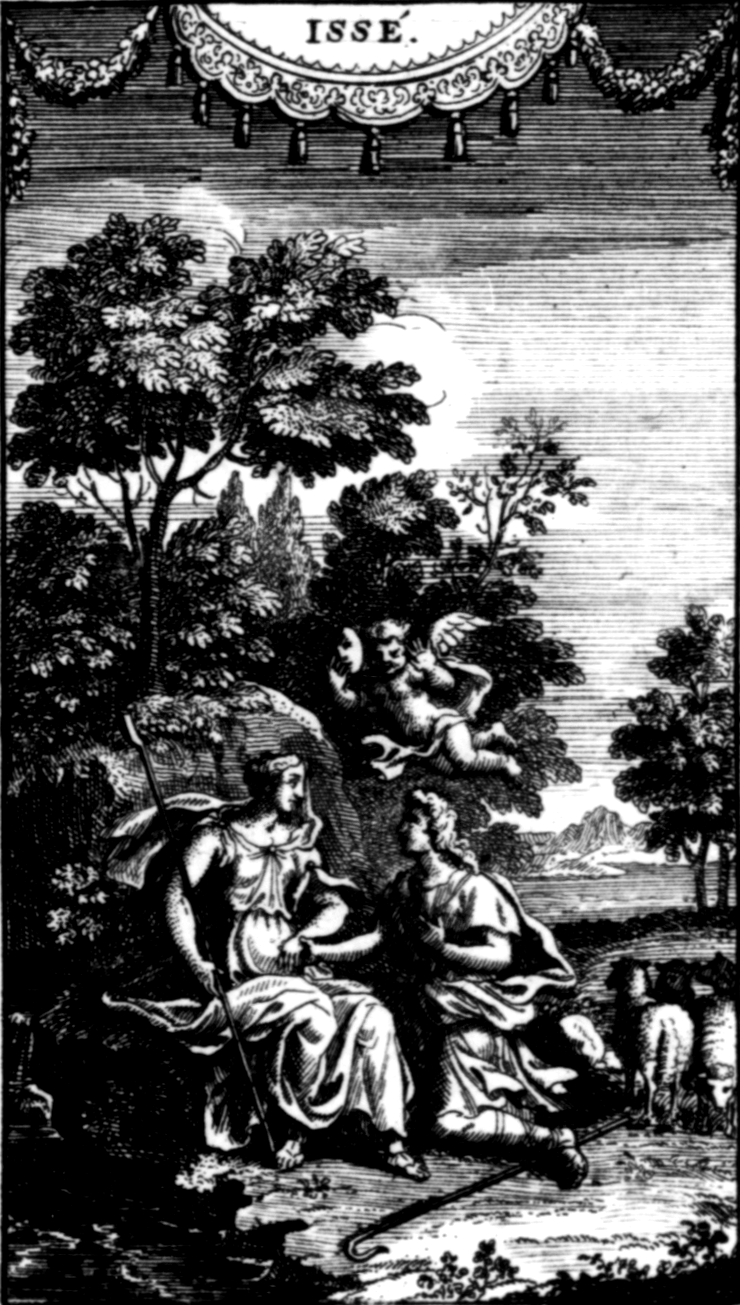
Image from the libretto

Issé is an operatic pastorale héroïque by the French composer André Cardinal Destouches. Initially it was in three acts. The definitive revised version consists of a prologue and five acts. The libretto was by Antoine Houdar de la Motte. Although Destouches was only 25 at the time of its premiere, it is considered his best score.

== Performance history ==
Issé was first performed in a concert version without a prologue in the Salle de la Belle-Cheminée at the Palace of Fontainebleau on 7 October 1697. At the request of Louis XIV, a prologue was added for the official premiere, a concert performance on 17 December at the Trianon (Versailles) for the festivities surrounding the marriage of Princess Marie Adélaïde of Savoy to Louis' grandson, the Duke of Burgundy, to whom Issé was dedicated. (Note: Casaglia places this performance at the "Théâtre de la Cour de Marbre du Grand Trianon di Versailles". This is confusing, since what is usually referred to as the Cour de Marbre is located in the main palace at Versailles (see Appartement du roi).) Louis XIV was so pleased with the work after its performance at the Trianon, that he gave Destouches a purse containing 200 louis. The first full staging by the Paris Opera (with the prologue and three acts) was on 30 December 1697 at the Théâtre du Palais-Royal in Paris. Destouches revised it in a grander five-act form for its revival at the Palais-Royal on 14 October 1708. Issé was so successful, it remained in the repertory there until 1757. It was also given again a number of times at the court up to 1773. Madame de Pompadour sang the title role for a production in the Théâtre des Petits Cabinets at the Palace of Versailles in 1749.

== Roles ==
Roles, voice types, premiere casts
Role	Voice type	Fontainebleau cast, 7 October 1697 Conductor: Antoine Grimaldi	Trianon cast, 17 December 1697 Conductor: Antoine Grimaldi	Five-act version, 14 October 1708 Conductor: –
Prologue
The first Hespéride	soprano	–	Marie-Louise Desmatins	Mlle Dun
Hercule	baritone	–	Charles Hardouin	Gabriel-Vincent Thévenard
Jupiter	baritone	–	Gabriel-Vincent Thévenard	Charles Hardouin
Pastorale héroique
Issé	soprano	Marthe Le Rochois	Marthe Le Rochois	Françoise Journet
Doris	soprano	Fanchon Moreau	Fanchon Moreau	Mlle Poussin
Philémon (Apollon)	haute-contre	Louis Gaulard Dumesny	Louis Gaulard Dumesny	Jacques Cochereau
Grand priest	baritone	Charles Hardouin	Charles Hardouin	Charles Hardouin
Hylas	baritone	Gabriel-Vincent Thévenard	Gabriel-Vincent Thévenard	Gabriel-Vincent Thévenard
Pan	bass	Jean Dun, 'père'	Jean Dun, 'père'	Jean Dun, 'père'
Shepherd, oracle	haute-contre	Jean Boutelou	Jean Boutelou	Jean Boutelou
Sleep	haute-contre	Jean Boutelou	Jean Boutelou	Buseau

== Synopsis ==
Apollon (Apollo), disguised as a shepherd called Philémon, pursues the nymph Issé, while Pan takes an interest in Doris.

== Discography ==
Judith van Wanroij, Issé, Chantal Santon-Jeffery, Doris, Eugénie Lefebvre, (La première Hespéride, une Nymphe, une Dryade), Mathias Vidal, Apollon (sous les traits du berger Philémon), Thomas Dolié, Hylas, Matthieu Lécroart, Jupiter, Pan, Etienne Bazola, Hercule, le Grand Prêtre, Stéphen Collardelle, un Berger, (Sommeil, Oracle), Les Chantres du Centre de Musique Baroque de Versailles, Ensemble Les Surprises, conducted by Louis-Noël Bestion de Camboulas. 2 CD Ambronay éditions 2019
