= JULIE: The Musical =

- Music: Abey Bradbury
- Lyrics: Abey Bradbury
- Book: Abey Bradbury
- Basis: Julie d'Aubigny
- Premiere: 2022

Julie: The Musical (stylised in all caps) is a British musical comedy biopic about the 17th century opera singer, swordswoman and queer historical figure, Julie d'Aubigny. Its music, book and lyrics were written by Manchester-based, queer creator Abey Bradbury, who also did costume design for the show. It was co-produced by Le Gasp! Productions.

Themes of the show include queerness, found family, feminism, and carving a place for yourself in a world not built for you.

== Plot ==
The show begins with Julie introducing herself, her situation, and the claim that everything that follows is a historical fact, apart from one thing that Julie herself wrote in. The initial scene of action at her own wedding to Monsieur Maupin ("The Wedding") - who is immediately sent as a tax collector to Southern France, leaving Julie free to have her own luxurious but constricted life in Paris as Count D’Armanac's mistress ("Me, Myself and I"). She soon runs away with Seranne, her fencing master hired by D’Armanac to keep her entertained, staging fights for money whilst on the run ("First Big Mistake"). After joining the Marseille opera house ("This"), she falls in love with Amelie, a merchant's daughter, who is removed to a nunnery when her family discovers the relationship ("For the Love of God"). Julie follows her to the nunnery, takes her vows and then burns down the abbey, escaping with Amelie, who returns to her family when life on the road gets too difficult. Alone, Julie returns to Paris, on the way meeting lifelong friend and rival, Gabriel-Vincent Thevenard before they both join the illustrious Paris Opera ("In Paris"). Having boosted her social status, the audience is introduced to Count D’Albert at a party, Julie's best friend whom she met on the way to Paris after stabbing him through the shoulder in a duel. At the party, Julie meets Marquiesse Marie de Florensac, who kisses her, triggering Marie's husband and three other men to challenge Julie to a duel. Although she wins, she runs away to Belgium as duelling is illegal.

In Brussels, Julie is safe, prosperous in the opera house, but bored. She briefly meets Marie de Florensac again, who remembers her from the party. Julie becomes mistress to a German prince, the elector of Bavaria, but when he is seen with another woman, she stabs herself live on stage to get his attention. Although it works, he later offers her 40,000 francs to stay away from him, which she rejects, and returns to Paris. In Paris, Julie is becoming more volatile, picking fights with Thevenard, other characters, and the actors in the real world who play them; the show becomes chaotic and fragmented. Julie can only be comforted and cared for by Marie, who nurses her back to health. The two fall in love and spend two years together before Marie dies. Julie is devastated ("Burn Out"), contemplating her own life and the one untrue claim of the story in the final moments of the show.

== Concept ==
Bradbury developed the musical to be unique from one performance to another. Between the 4 (formerly 5) person cast, over 50 characters are represented, with "no set rules for who plays what"; roles and combinations of roles may be played by a different actor-musicians every time, with no constraint on gender of the actor.

The musical arrangement is similarly fluid, with new instruments added and removed based on the abilities of the cast, who are also the band. Bradbury attributes this as the impact of their background in band and folk music, being a self-taught composer without the use of sheet music. As such, they have no traditional "score written out", but instead a collection of "lyrics, melodies and chord progressions - the ‘skeleton’ of the songs".

Several moments throughout the performance are also improvised. For example, when various characters audition for the opera, there is no set audition song.

== Previous runs ==
=== Performances ===
- UK TOUR | Jun-Aug 2023 CAST: Sam Kearney-Edwardes, Sophie Coward, Fabian Soto Pacheco, Georgia Stoller, Alex Tilley, Abey Bradbury
- UK FRINGE TOUR | Jul-Nov 2022 CAST: Abey Bradbury, Sam Kearney-Edwardes, Sophie Coward, Connor Simkins, Grant Cartwright, Kyanna Crownshaw, Owen Clayton

=== R&D / Workshops ===
- JULIE R&D @ Leeds Playhouse | June 2021 | 4 Day R&D workshop WORKSHOP CAST: Abey Bradbury, Sam Kearney-Edwardes, Sophie Coward, Connor Simkins
- JULIE EXCERPTS @ Rural Arts, Thirsk | Dec 2021 | 20 minute Scratch Performance CAST: Abey Bradbury, Sam Kearney-Edwards, Mary Barrett
- JULIE: THE CONCERT @ 53Two | Jan 2022 |First Concert-style sharing of the entire show WORKSHOP & SHARING CAST: Abey Bradbury, Sam Kearney-Edwardes, Sophie Coward, Connor Simkins, Grant Cartwright
- JULIE EXCERPTS @ Hope Mill Theatre for TurnOn Fest | Feb 2022 |20 minute Gig-style sharing WORKSHOP CAST: Abey Bradbury, Sam Kearney-Edwardes, Connor Simkins PERFORMANCE CAST: Abey Bradbury, Sam Kearney-Edwardes, Sophie Coward

== Honors and awards ==
Year	Award	Category	Result
2022	OffComm		Won
2022	Theatrebab	Best touring show	Won
2022	North West End	Best of 2022	Won
2024	The Offies	Best New Musical	Nominated
2024	The Offies	Best Costume	Nominated
