= Gabriel-Vincent Thévenard =

French opera singer

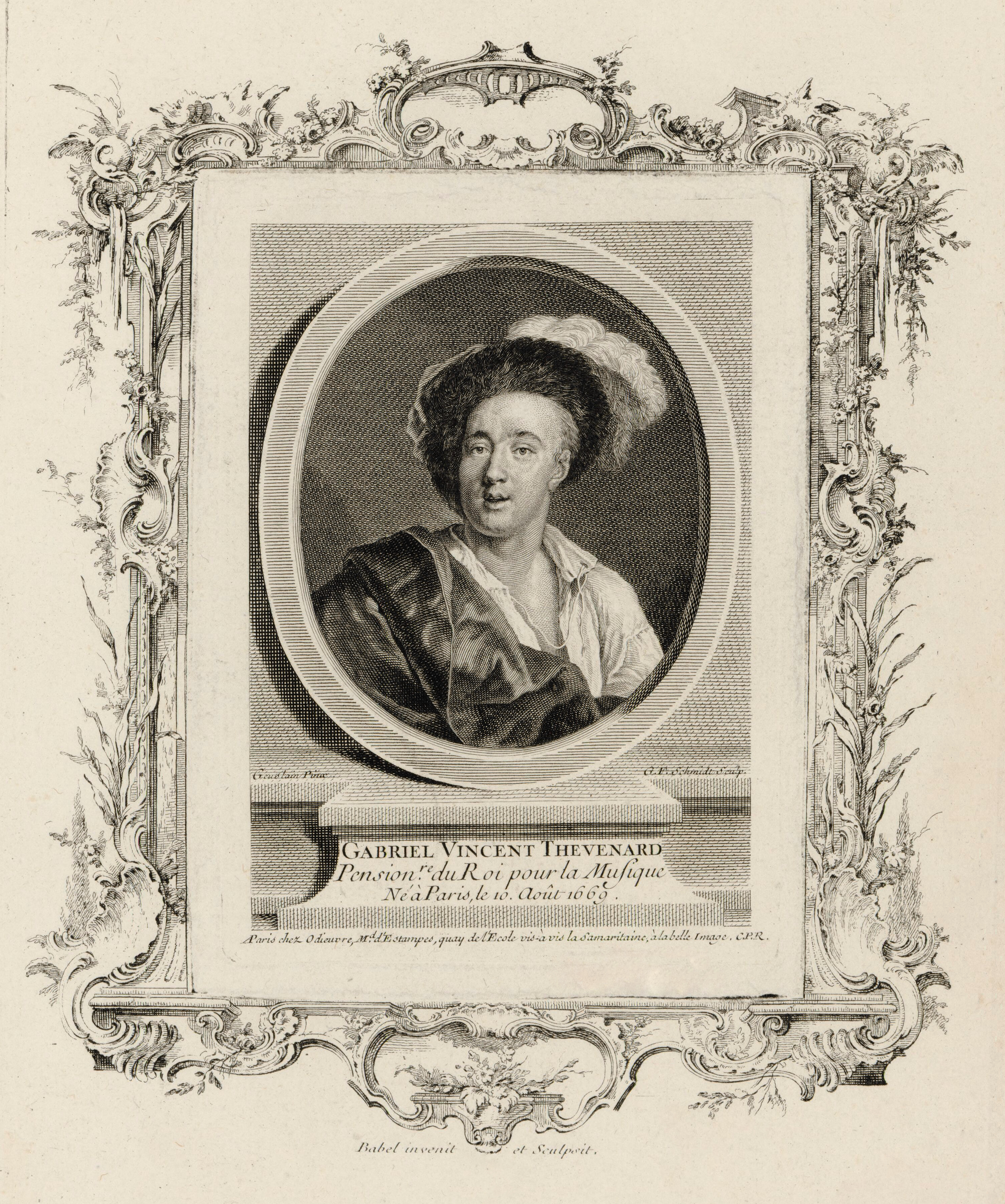
Gabriel-Vincent Thévenard

Gabriel-Vincent Thévenard (10 August 1669 – 24 August 1741) was a French operatic baritone (basse taille).

Thévenard was born at Orléans or possibly Paris. Arriving in Paris in 1690, he studied under the composer André Cardinal Destouches and went on to become a member of the Académie Royale de Musique. He was notable for playing tragic roles that made use of his skill at declamatory recitatives. He appeared in over 80 tragédies en musique and opéras ballet before finally retiring in 1729. He died in Paris.

== Roles created ==
- Apollon/Vertumne/l'Automne in Pascal Colasse et Louis Lully's Ballet des Saisons (Paris, 1695)
- Jupiter/Hylas in Destouches's Issé (Fontainebleau, 1697)
- Silvandre/Zuliman in André Campra's L'Europe galante (Paris, 1697)
- The title role in Destouches's Amadis de Grèce (Paris, 1699)
- Argapise in Destouches's Marthesie, première reine des Amazones (Paris, 1699)
- Pygmalion in Michel de la Barre's Le triomphe des arts (Paris, 1700)
- Picus in Colasse's Canente (Paris, 1700)
- Anchise in Campra's Hésione (Paris, 1700)
- Alphée in Campra's Aréthuse (Paris, 1701)
- Minos in Theobaldo di Gatti's Scylla (Paris, 1701)
- Alcide in Destouches's Omphale (Paris, 1701)
- The title role in François Bouvard's Médus, roi des Mèdes (Paris, 1702)
- The title role in Campra's Tancrède (Paris, 1702)
- The title role and a savage (prologue) in Jean-Féry Rebel's Ulysse (Paris, 1703)
- Bacchus in Campra's Les muses (Paris, 1703)
- Carnaval in Destouches's Le Carnaval et la Folie (Paris, 1704)
- Oreste in Desmarets and Campra's Iphigénie en Tauride (Paris, 1704)
- Atlas in Campra's Alcine (Paris, 1705)
- Térée in Louis de La Coste's Philomèle (Paris, 1705)
- Pelée in Marin Marais's Alcione (Paris, 1706)
- Agamemnon in Bertin de la Doué and Bouvard's Cassandre (Paris, 1706)
- Pyrrhus in Colasse's Polyxène et Pyrrhus (Paris, 1706)
- Roger in de La Coste's Bradamante (Paris, 1707)
- Pélops in Campra's Hippodamie (Paris, 1708)
- Jupiter in Marais's Sémélé (Paris, 1709)
- The title role in Batistin's Méléagre (Paris, 1709)
- The title role in Bertin de la Doué's Diomède (Paris, 1710)
- Carnaval/Léandre in Campra's Les fêtes vénitiennes (Paris, 1710)
- Lycarcis in Batistin's Manto la fée (Paris, 1711)
- The title role in Campra's Idoménée (Paris, 1712)
- Phorbas in de La Coste's Créüse l'Athénienne (Paris, 1712)
- Mars/Silène in Campra's Les amours de Venus et Mars (Paris, 1712)
- Corisus in Destouches's Callirhoé (Paris, 1712)
- Créon in Joseph François Salomon's Medée et Jason (Paris, 1713)
- Diomède/Ovide in Thomas-Louis Bourgeois's Les amours déguisés (Paris, 1713)
- The title role in Campra's Télèphe (Paris, 1713)
- Eurylas in Jean-Baptiste Matho's Arion (Paris, 1714)
- Apollon in Jean-Joseph Mouret's Les festes de Thalie (Paris, 1714)
- Adraste in Destouches's Télémaque (Paris, 1714)
- Licas in Bourgeois's Les plaisirs de la paix (Paris, 1715)
- Thestor in Salomon's Théonoé (Paris, 1715)
- Danaüs in Charles-Hubert Gervais's Hypermestre (Paris, 1716)
- Thésée in Mouret's Ariane (Paris, 1717)
- Almon in Campra's Camille, reine des Volsques (Paris, 1717)
- The title role in Bertin de la Doué's Le jujement de Pâris (Paris, 1718)
- Eraste in Campra's Les âges (Paris, 1718)
- Zoroastre in Destouches's Semiramis (Paris, 1718)
- Valère/Lisimon in Bertin de la Doué's Les plaisirs de la campagne (Paris, 1719)
- The title role in Batistin's Polydore (Paris, 1720)
- The title role in Gervais's Les amours de Protée (Paris, 1720)
- Ixion/Valère in Destouches and Delalande's Les élémens (Paris, 1721)
- Adraste in Desmarets's Renaud ou La suite d'Armide (Paris, 1722)
- Eurite in Mouret's Pirithoüs (Paris, 1723)
- Apollon/Alcibiade/Marc-Antoine in François Colin de Blamont's Les festes grecques et romaines (Paris, 1723)
- Nourredin in Jacques Aubert's La reine des Péris (Paris, 1725)
- The title role in de La Coste's Télégone (Paris, 1725)
- Léandre/Émile in Destouches's Les stratagèmes de l'Amour (Paris, 1726)
- The male title role in François Francœur et François Rebel's Pirame et Thisbé (Paris, 1726)
- Neptune/Bacchus in Mouret's Les amours des dieux (Paris, 1727)
- Saturne in Le ballet du Parnasse, pastiche with music by various authors collated by Colin de Blamont (Versailles, 1729)

== Sources ==
- Cyr, Mary (1992), 'Thévenard, Gabriel-Vincent' in The New Grove Dictionary of Opera, ed. Stanley Sadie (London) ISBN 0-333-73432-7
- Pitou, Spire, The Paris Opéra. An Encyclopedia of Operas, Ballets, Composers, and Performers – Genesis and Glory, 1671-1715, Greenwood Press, Westport/London, 1983 ISBN 0-313-21420-4
- Pitou, Spire, The Paris Opéra. An Encyclopedia of Operas, Ballets, Composers, and Performers – Rococo and Romantic, 1715-1815, Greenwood Press, Westport/London, 1985 ISBN 0-313-24394-8
