= Jean-Nicolas de Francine =

Jean-Nicolas de Francine (1662–1735) was a director of the Opéra national de Paris.

== Life ==
From the Francini family of Florentine musicians that had come to France under Henry IV of France, Jean-Nicolas married Jean-Baptiste Lully's eldest daughter Catherine-Madeleine Lully on 18 April 1684, in the presence of Louis XIV. On Lully's death, Francine won the privilege of directing the opera. The first work put on under his leadership was Achille et Polyxène. He also authorised the opening of opera houses in France's provincial cities – Lyon, Lille, Bordeaux, Rouen.

Not himself a composer, he commissioned others to renew the operatic repertoire, putting on works by Louis Lully, Pascal Collasse, Elisabeth Jacquet de la Guerre and Marc-Antoine Charpentier. He was poor at management, however, and was forced to go into debt to keep the institution afloat, finally leading to the selling of his privilege in 1704 in favour of Pierre Guyenet. He returned to the post in 1715 following calls from Guyenet's creditors, after had Guyenet also proved unable to redress the problems. However, despite the king's support, the opera house was still not in profit when he ceded his place to André Cardinal Destouches in 1728.

== Sources ==
- http://arsmagnalucis.free.fr/academie-opera.html
- https://web.archive.org/web/20061125100536/http://sites.univ-lyon2.fr/musiquefr-18/institut/InstitP/academie.html
- http://operabaroque.fr/LULLY_ACHILLE.htm

| Preceded by Jean-Baptiste Lully | Director of the Académie royale de musique 1687–1704 | Succeeded by Pierre Guyenet |
| Preceded by Pierre Guyenet | Director of the Académie royale de musique 1712–1728 | Succeeded by André Cardinal Destouches |
