= Julie d'Aubigny =

French opera singer (1673–1707)

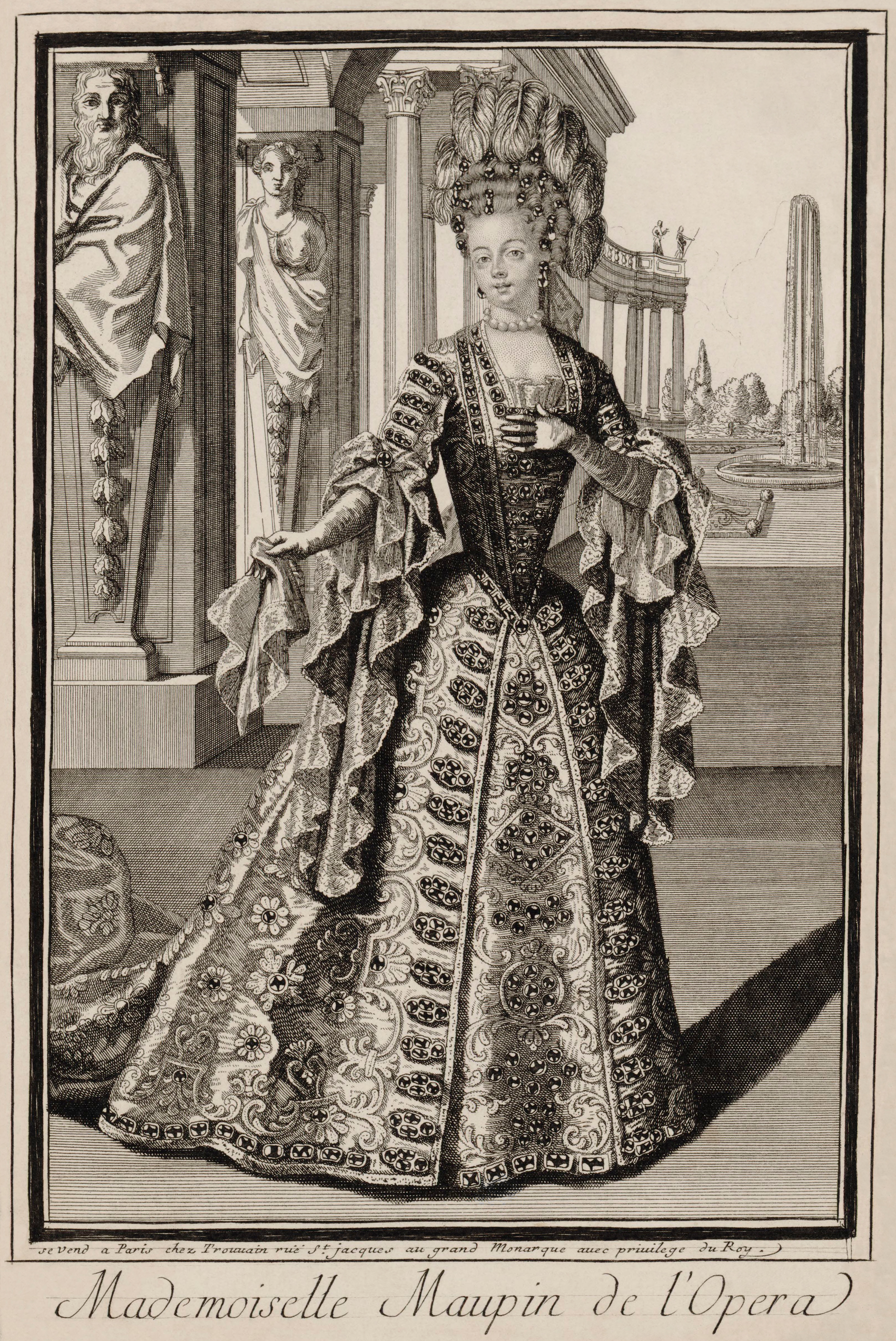
- "Mademoiselle Maupin de l'Opéra". Anonymous print, c. 1700.
- Born: 1673
- Died: 1707 (aged 33–34)
- Spouse: Sieur de Maupin
- Relatives: Gaston d'Aubigny (father)

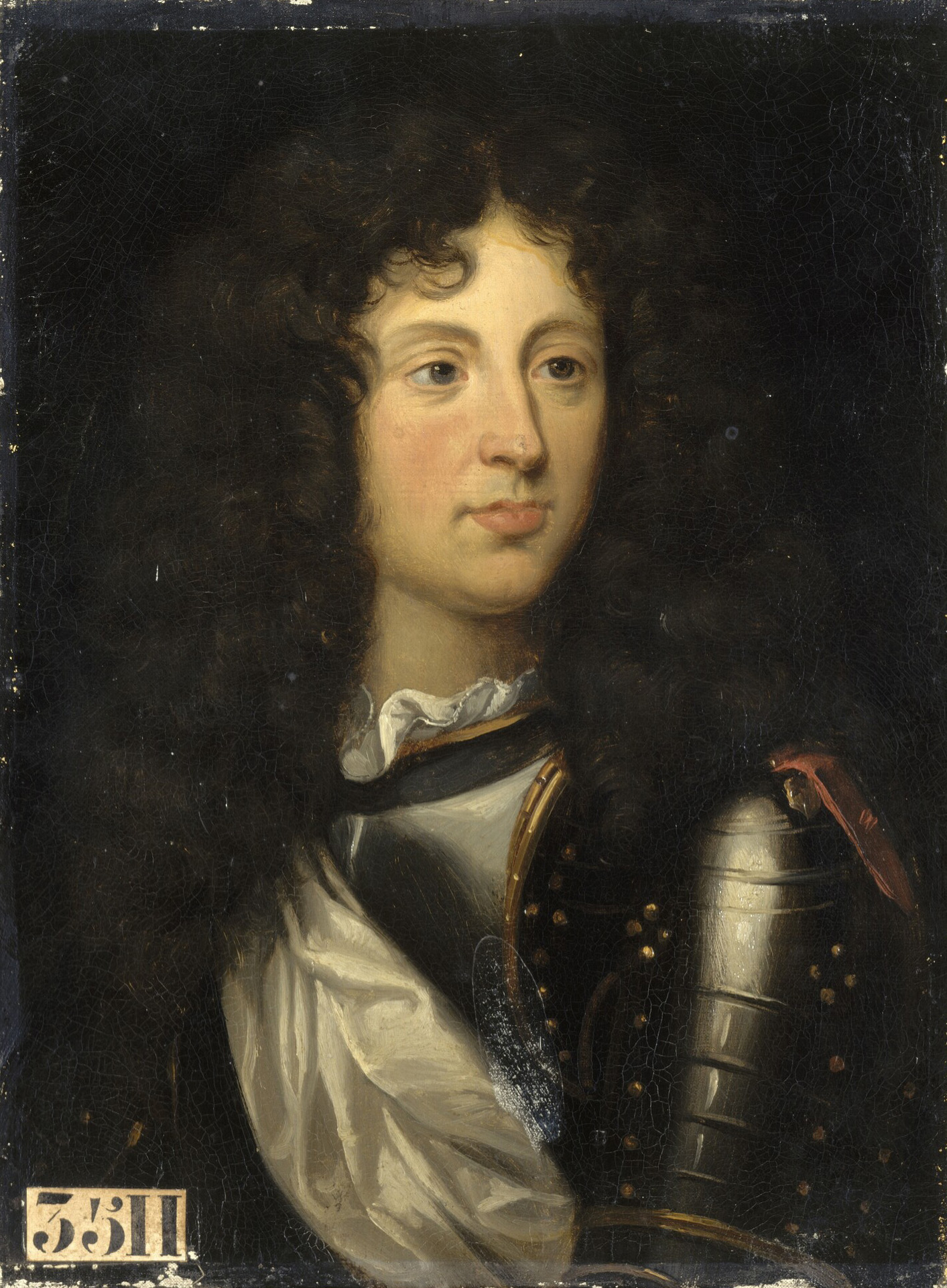
D'Aubigny's first partner was Louis de Lorraine, comte d'Armagnac.

Julie d'Aubigny (French: [ʒyli dobiɲi]; 1673–1707), better known as Mademoiselle Maupin or La Maupin, was a French opera singer. Little is known for certain about her life beyond her position as a soloist at the Paris Opera and some of the roles she sang there; her tumultuous career and flamboyant lifestyle were the subject of gossip, rumour, and colourful stories in her own time, and inspired numerous fictional and semi-fictional portrayals afterwards.

Her life loosely inspired the titular character of Théophile Gautier's 1835 novel, Mademoiselle de Maupin, in which she employs multiple disguises to seduce a young man and his mistress. Due to her relationships with men and women, some modern-day sources refer to d'Aubigny as bisexual or queer. Closer to her own lifetime, she was referred to in 1775 as "the new Sappho," and it was said that her "singular taste... for persons of her sex was so lively, that she exposed herself to frequent contempt on their part.”

== Early life ==
Julie d'Aubigny was born in 1673 to Gaston d'Aubigny (1640–1698), a secretary to Louis de Lorraine-Guise, comte d'Armagnac, the Master of the Horse for King Louis XIV. Her father, who trained the court pages, took care of her education teaching her academic subjects of the type given to boys but also trained her in fencing in which she gained competence from the age of 12, competing successfully against men.

By the age of 14, she became Louis de Lorraine's mistress. That year, in 1687, the Count d'Armagnac arranged for her to marry one Monsieur Maupin of Saint-Germain-en-Laye, and she became Madame de Maupin. Soon after the wedding, her husband received an administrative position in the south of France, while she remained in Paris.

== Youth ==
Also around 1687, d'Aubigny became involved with an assistant fencing master named Sérannes. When Lieutenant-General of Police Gabriel Nicolas de la Reynie tried to apprehend Sérannes for killing a man in an illegal duel, the couple fled the city to the countryside. During this period, d'Aubigny and Sérannes made a living by giving fencing exhibitions and singing in taverns and at local fairs. While travelling and performing in these impromptu shows, d'Aubigny dressed in traditionally male clothing. On arrival in Marseille, she joined the opera company run by Gaultier de Marseilles (1642–1696), singing under her maiden name.

During this time, d'Aubigny began her first sapphic relationship with a young woman. The young woman's parents sent their daughter away to a convent in Avignon, possibly the Visitandines convent, to prevent the two from contacting each other. D'Aubigny followed, entering the convent as a postulant. In order to run away with her new love, she stole the body of a dead nun, placed it in the bed of her lover, and set the room on fire before escaping. Their affair lasted for a few months before the young woman returned to her family. The plan was for the burned body to be mistaken for that of Julie's lover, but the plot was uncovered. D'Aubigny was charged in absentia—as a male—with kidnapping, body snatching, arson, and failing to appear before the tribunal and sentenced to death by burning.

D'Aubigny left for Paris and again earned her living by singing. In a Villeperdue inn, she met the young Comte d'Albert who mistook her for a man: they duelled, she won, he was wounded and she nursed him back to health. They became on-and-off lovers and lifelong friends. At this time, d'Aubigny sought professional singing lessons from a middle-aged musician and actor named Maréchal who, impressed by her talent, encouraged her to apply to the Paris Opera.

== Opera and adult life ==
The Paris Opera initially rejected her but hired her in 1690. She befriended an elderly singer, Bouvard, and he and Thévenard convinced Jean-Nicolas de Francine, master of the king's household, to accept her into the company. She debuted as Pallas Athena in Cadmus et Hermione by Jean-Baptiste Lully the same year. She performed regularly with the Opera from 1690 to 1694, first taking on smaller roles, and later graduating to leading roles in both tragic and comic operas. This was the point at which she first became known as "La Maupin"; French custom at the time referred to notable female performers by surname alone, as a stage name. The Marquis de Dangeau wrote in his journal of a performance by La Maupin given at Trianon of Destouches' Omphale in 1701 that hers was "the most beautiful voice in the world".

In Paris, and later in Brussels, she performed under the name Mademoiselle de Maupin; by tradition, women who sang or danced with the Opera were addressed as "mademoiselle" whether or not they were married. In Brussels, she performed at the Opéra du Quai au Foin.

The many biographical accounts of her life, from the eighteenth century onwards, include stories of her winning several duels with the sword—on one occasion with three noblemen in the same evening, after she kissed a young woman at a ball—and beating the singer Louis Gaulard Dumesny after he insulted the other women at the Opera. She continued to wear men's clothing in public and had relationships with both men and women.

La Maupin sang in new operas by Pascal Collasse, André Cardinal Destouches, and André Campra. In 1702, André Campra composed the role of Clorinde in Tancrède specifically for her voice. However, despite many writers praising her bas-dessus (contralto) range, the role of Clorinde as written shows no marked downward shift in range from any other comparable roles of the time. She appeared for the last time in La vénitienne (1705) by Michel de La Barre.

After the death of her lover in 1705, Madame la Marquise de Florensac, with whom she had "dwelt in such affection they believed to be perfect", La Maupin retired from the opera and took refuge in a convent, where she is believed to have died in 1707 at the age of 33.

== Gautier's Mademoiselle de Maupin ==
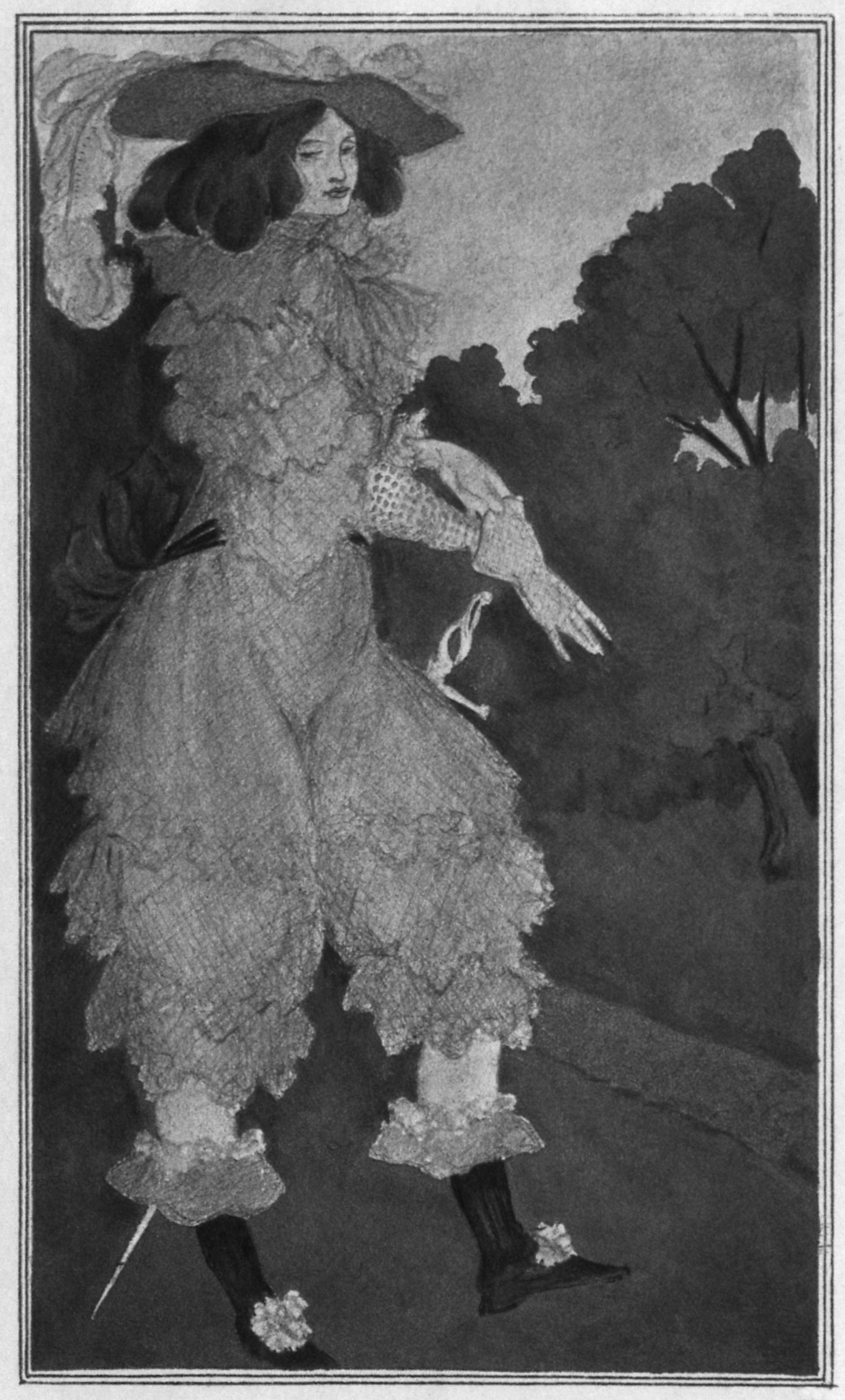
The fictional Mademoiselle de Maupin, from Six Drawings Illustrating Théophile Gautier's Romance Mademoiselle de Maupin by Aubrey Beardsley, 1898

Théophile Gautier, when asked to write a story about d'Aubigny, instead produced the novel Mademoiselle de Maupin, published in 1835, taking aspects of the real La Maupin as a starting point. Gautier named some of the characters after her and her acquaintances, although the plot and characters are invented, and it is set in the nineteenth century. The central character's life was viewed through a romantic lens as "all for love" and Gautier argues for "Art for art's sake" in its famous preface. D'Albert and his mistress Rosette are both in love with the androgynous Théodore de Sérannes, whom neither of them knows is really Madeleine de Maupin. A performance of Shakespeare's As You Like It, in which La Maupin, who is passing as Théodore, plays the part of Rosalind playing Ganymede, mirrors the cross-dressing of the heroine. The celebration of sensual love, regardless of gender, was radical, and the book was banned by the New York Society for the Suppression of Vice and authorities elsewhere.

== Opera roles created ==
- Magician in Henri Desmarets's Didon (Paris, 1693)
- Clorinde in André Campra's Tancrède (Paris, 1702)
- Diana and Thétis in Campra's Iphigénie en Tauride (Paris, 1704)
- La Felicite and Thetys in Campra's Télémaque, ou Les fragments des modernes (Paris, 1704)
- Mélanie and Vénus in Campra's Alcine (Paris, 1705)
- Isabelle in Michel de La Barre's La Venitienne (Paris, 1705)

== Portrayals ==
Apart from Gautier's Mademoiselle de Maupin, La Maupin has been portrayed many times in print, stage and screen, including:

- Labie, Charles and Augier, Joanny (1839), La Maupin, ou, Une vengeance d'actrice: comedie-vaudeville en un acte Mifliez, Paris. (In French.)
- Madamigella di Maupin (1966), film. (In Italian.)
- Evans, Henri (1980) Amand and its sequel (1985) La petite Maupin, France Loisirs, Paris. (In French.)
- Dautheville, Anne-France (1995), Julie, chevalier de Maupin J.-C. Lattes, Paris. (In French.)
- Julie, chevalier de Maupin (2004), television mini-series. (In French.)
- Gardiner, Kelly, 2014, Goddess, Fourth Estate/HarperCollins, Sydney (in English)
- La Maupin, the Musical (2017), debuting at 2017 Fresh Fruit Festival in New York City.
- Revenge Song: A Vampire Cowboys Creation (2020), a play that premiered at the Geffen Playhouse in 2020
- Julie, an original opera on film by La Camerata (2020)
- La Maupin, a folk punk musical by Fantasic Garlands Theatre at The Lion and Unicorn Theatre, London (2022)
- JULIE: The Musical, a musical co-produced by Le Gasp! Productions with book, music and lyrics by Abey Bradbury (2022)
- THE ARIA OF JULIE D'AUBIGNY, the cross-dressing, sword-fighting, opera singer, wherein she seduces men and women alike, wins numerous duels, must be twice pardoned by the King, and eventually finds true love., a play by Monica Cross (2023)
- Mademoiselle and the Nunnery Blaze, a song by English indie pop band Bastille in their 2024 album “&” about d’Aubigny’s first sapphic relationship that resulted in her setting fire to a convent
- Sword Songs, a classical song cycle by Meta Cohen and Evan Bryson (2025)
- Beyond the ball, a Dutch barok-meets new wave musical by Collectief Aqueerius (2026)
- Kiss My Sword, an upcoming new opera by composer Meta Cohen, librettist Evan Bryson and director/dramaturg Alyson Campbell (2026)
- The Blade's Edge, a one-women show starring Bryony Tebbutt, devised by Tebbutt and writer Tony Voller, and directed by Lisa McKinnon, opened at the OSO Arts Centre in Barnes, London (2026)
