= Louison Moreau =

French operatic soprano (1668–1692)

Louise 'Louison' Moreau (born before 1668 – died after 1692) was a French operatic soprano who belonged to the Académie Royale de Musique, also a popular celebrity commonly referred to as one of the filles de l'opéra.

== Opera career ==
Preceding her younger sister Fanchon Moreau by about three years, Louison made her debut at the Paris Opéra around 1680. Once dismissed for being pregnant, she was reinstated and remained until 1692. From 1683 to 1692 when both sisters were referred to as 'Mlle Moreau', it usually makes it difficult to determine who sang what, however popular songs of the day and gossip columns are sometimes revealing. It is known that Louison created the role of Amasie in the premiere of Orontée, a tragédie en musique by Jean-Louis Lully, the son of Jean-Baptiste Lully, and Paolo Lorenzani in 1688.

== Celebrity ==
Like her sister, Louison received the attentions of Louis, Grand Dauphin, to whom she was introduced in error when it was intended to present her reputedly more beautiful younger sister to him.

== Bibliography ==
- Clark, J. (1980). 'Les Folies Françoises' in Early Music 8(2):163-169

== Sources ==
- Anthony, James R (1992), 'Moreau, Louison' in The New Grove Dictionary of Opera, ed. Stanley Sadie (London) ISBN 0-333-73432-7
