= Vénus et Adonis =

1697 opera composed by Henri Desmarets

Title page of the libretto for Vénus et Adonis, published by Christophe Ballard, Paris, 1697

Vénus et Adonis is an opera (tragédie en musique) in a prologue and 5 acts composed by Henri Desmarets to a libretto by Jean-Baptiste Rousseau. Based on the story of Venus and Adonis in Book X of Ovid's Metamorphoses, it was first performed by the Académie Royale de Musique at the Théâtre du Palais-Royal in Paris on 28 July 1697 with Marie Le Rochois and Louis Gaulard Dumesny in the title roles. Desmarets staged a major revival of the work with a new prologue at the court of Leopold, Duke of Lorraine in 1707. During the composer's lifetime, it was performed in Germany, Belgium, and France, but then fell into obscurity. Its first staging in modern times took place at the Opéra de Nancy on 28 April 2006.

== Background and performance history ==
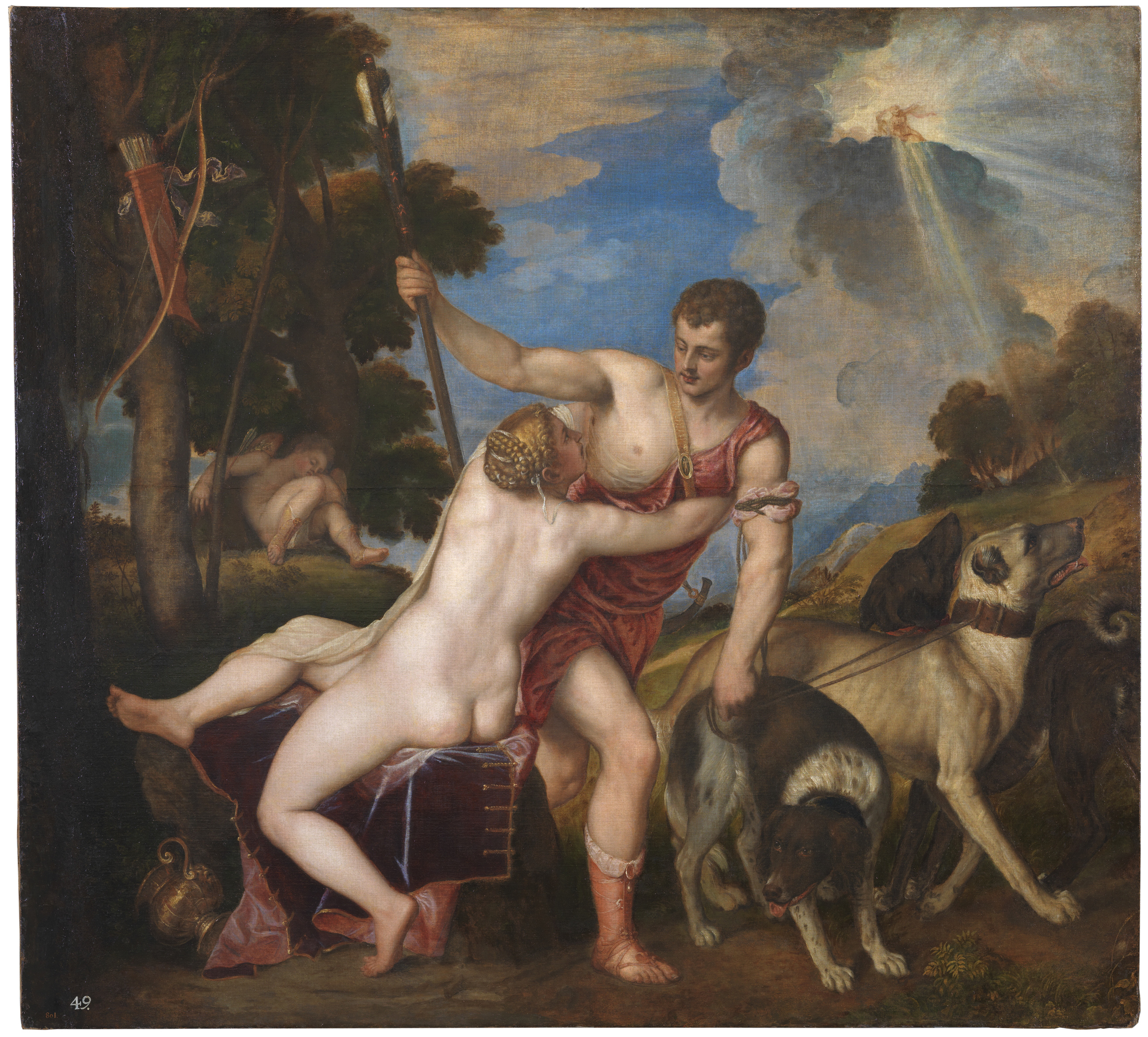
Venus and Adonis, one of Titian's many portrayals of the myth

Vénus et Adonis was Desmarets' eighth stage work and his third to be premiered at the Académie Royale de Musique. Between 1695 and 1697, Desmarets was working simultaneously on Vénus et Adonis, Les festes galantes (an opéra-ballet), and another five-act tragédie en musique, Iphigénie en Tauride. Vénus et Adonis was the first of the three to premiere, and according to the French musicologist Jean Duron, it was also Desmarets' favourite work. His librettist was Jean-Baptiste Rousseau, who was at the start of his career and only 26 when the opera premiered. The myth of Venus and Adonis as recounted in Book X of Ovid's Metamorphoses held a particular fascination for the poets, artists, and musicians of the Renaissance and Baroque eras and was the inspiration for numerous works. It had been the subject of at least two operas prior to Desmarets and Rousseau's treatment, Mazzocchi's La catena d'Adone (1626) and John Blow's Venus and Adonis (1683), as well as Donneau de Visé's play, Les Amours de Vénus et d'Adonis with music by Charpentier (1669). Rousseau's treatment differed in that he added the character of Cidippe, a Cypriot princess, whose unrequited love for Adonis eventually ends in her suicide.

During the time Desmarets was completing Vénus et Adonis and preparing the cast for its premiere, he was embroiled in a scandal involving his love affair with Marie-Marguerite de Saint-Gobert, the eighteen-year-old daughter of a high official in Senlis. Her father was implacably opposed to a marriage, and the couple eloped to Paris in June 1697. Vénus et Adonis premiered on 28 July 1697 with Marie Le Rochois as Venus and Louis Gaulard Dumesny as Adonis. Six months later, Marie-Marguerite gave birth to a son and her father brought a criminal prosecution against Desmarets for seduction and kidnapping which was to last for over two years. Les festes galantes premiered in 1698, but Desmarets left Iphigénie en Tauride unfinished when he and Marie-Marguerite fled France in 1699. Desmarets was condemned to death in absentia and only pardoned some 20 years later.

After several years in exile as the court composer for Philip V of Spain, Desmarets took up an appointment as master of music at the court of Leopold, Duke of Lorraine in Lunéville. There he revived Vénus et Adonis on 15 November 1707 to celebrate the Duke's name day. Desmarets had dedicated Vénus et Adonis to his long-time patron Louis XIV and set the prologue on the plains of Marly-le-Roi with Louis XIV's famous leisure residence, Château de Marly in the background. For the 1707 Lunéville performances, Desmarets and Rousseau created a completely new prologue set in the gardens of Duke Leopold's château. In the ensuing years Vénus et Adonis was performed at the court of Charles III in Baden-Durlach (1713), La Monnaie in Brussels (1714), the Académie Royale de Musique with the Duchesse de Berry in attendance (1717), in Hamburg performed in French but with a comic prologue in German (1725), and in Lyon (1739). Between 1714 and 1739, extracts from the opera were also heard at the royal court in Sweden and in London. Over 250 years of obscurity followed until 28 April 2006 when the opera received its first staging in modern times at the Opéra de Nancy directed and conducted by Christophe Rousset. The Nancy performances by the baroque orchestra Les Talens Lyriques with Karine Deshayes as Venus and Sébastien Droy as Adonis, were recorded live and released on CD in 2007.

== Roles ==
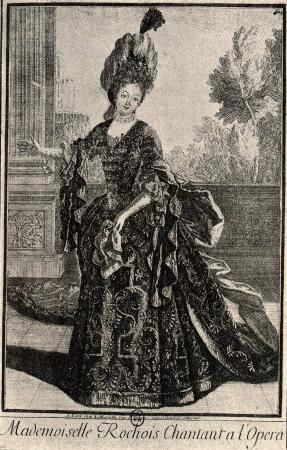
Marie Le Rochois, Vénus in the opera's 1697 premiere

Prologue (original Paris Version)

- Mélicerte, a nymph
- Partenope, a nymph
- Palémon, a shepherd
- Diana

Opera

- Adonis (haute-contre) – created by Louis Gaulard Dumesny
- Venus (soprano) – created by Marie Le Rochois
- Cidippe, a princess of Cyprus (soprano) – created by Marie-Louise Desmatins
- Mars (bass) – created by Charles Hardouin
- Bellona
- Jealousy
- A follower of Mars
- An inhabitant of Cyprus

== Synopsis ==
=== Prologue ===
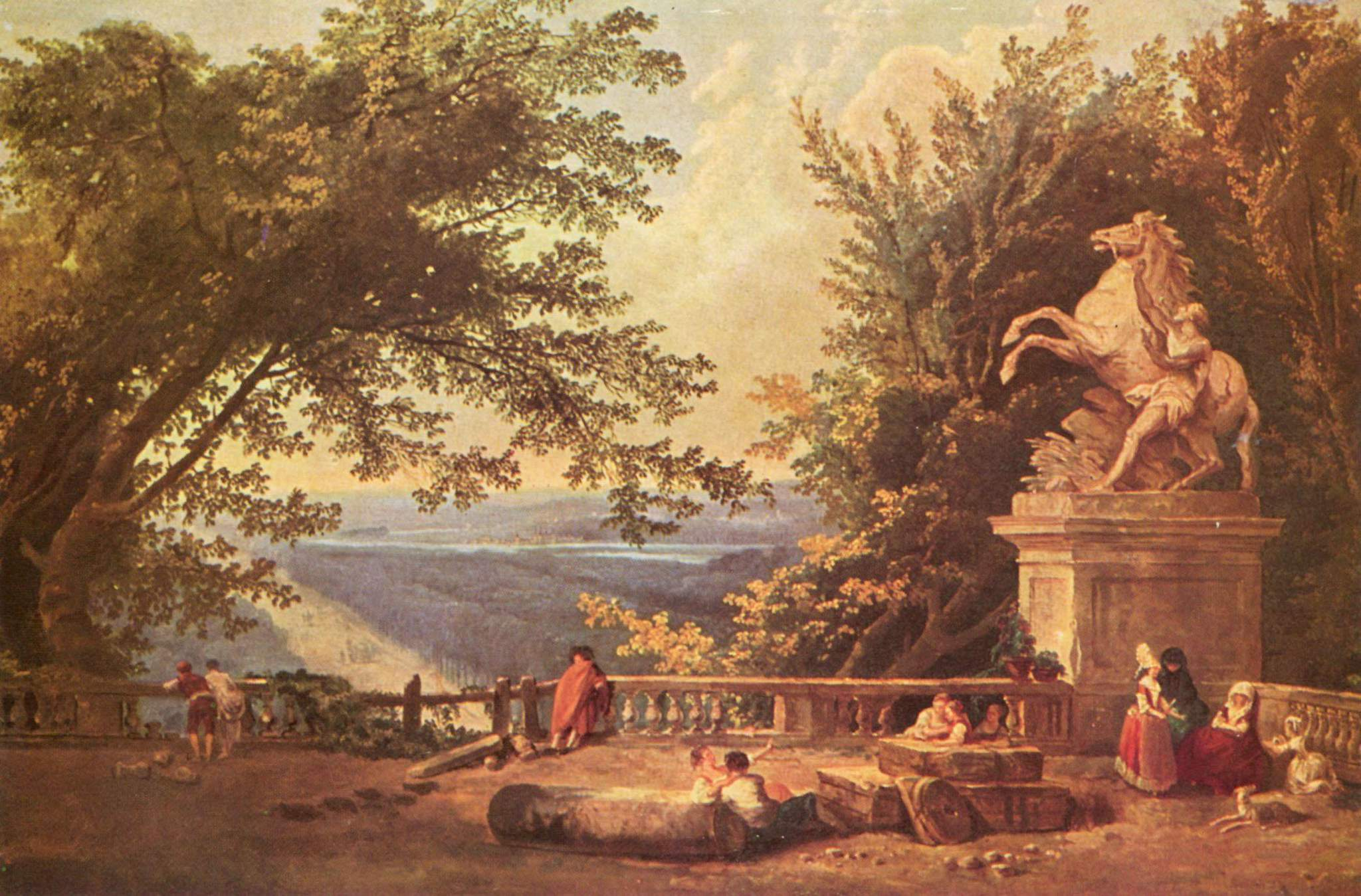
View from the terrace of Château de Marly painted by Hubert Robert

A plain at dawn with the Château de Marly in the distance

The nymphs, Mélicerte and Partenope, and Palemon, a shepherd, sing the praises of love and simple pleasures which can now be enjoyed thanks to the peace secured by the "greatest king in the world" (Louis XIV). A dance by the shepherds is interrupted when Diana arrives in her chariot to recount the tale of Adonis, in which love ended in tragedy.

=== Act 1 ===
The island of Cyprus

Festivities are underway for the arrival of Venus who is to proclaim the new king of Cyprus. Venus arrives and announces that she has chosen Adonis as king, beckoning him to the royal palace. Vénus confesses her love for Adonis to Princess Cidippe, who also secretly loves him. Cidippe warns Venus that her love for Adonis risks angering her lover, Mars.

=== Act 2 ===
Inside the royal palace

Adonis and Venus declare their love for each other and Venus proposes that they announce it to all with a public celebration. Later, she encounters Cidippe and joyfully tells her what has happened. Alone and consumed by disappointed love, Cidippe calls upon Jealousy and her followers to bring an end to the love affair.

=== Act 3 ===
A garden prepared for the celebrations of Venus and Adonis

Mars is suspicious of the preparations for a celebration and tells his followers that the descent of Venus to earth has aroused his jealousy. He conceals himself in order to discover who her new lover might be. Venus and Adonis arrive accompanied by their attendants and sing of their love. The Graces and the young men of Cyprus come to pay their respects to the couple but flee when Mars appears. Mars angrily confronts Venus, but she feigns innocence and announces that she is leaving for Paphos. Mars is reassured until Cidippe tells him that he has been deceived. Together they plan their revenge on Venus and Adonis.

=== Act 4 ===
The city of Amathus

Venus, believing that she has successfully deceived Mars, reassures Adonis and tells him that she must go to Paphos where festivities are being held in her honour. Mars and Cidippe confront Adonis. Mars prepares to kill him, but his hand is stayed by Cidippe who suggests a sacrifice. Mars summons Bellona, the goddess of war. She and her followers wreak havoc on the city of Amanthus and its people while Mars calls on Diana herself to punish Adonis.

=== Act 5 ===
The ruins of Amathus and the surrounding countryside

Diana has unleashed a terrible beast who is killing the people of Amanthus, much to the satisfaction of Mars. Cidippe implores him to intervene, but he refuses and ascends to Mount Olympus. Adonis meets Cidippe as he sets out to slay the monster. Left alone, Cydipe waits in terror until she hears the news that Adonis has triumphed. The people of Amathus give thanks for the bravery of their new king. Eager to find Adonis, Venus returns from Paphos and descends from her chariot amidst dancing and cheers. Cidippe confesses to Venus that she too loves Adonis and it was she who had spurred Mars to anger and vengeance. They then learn that Diana had brought the beast back to life and that it has killed Adonis. Cidippe commits suicide as Venus and the chorus lament the tragic fate of Adonis.

== Recording ==
- Vénus et Adonis, Les Talens Lyriques, conducted by Christophe Rousset. Karine Deshayes (Venus), Sébastien Droy (Adonis), Henk Neven (Mars), Anna Maria Panzarella (Cidippe). Recorded live at the Opéra de Nancy, April–May 2006 (2 CDs, Naïve Records, 2007)

== Sources ==
- Casaglia, Gherardo (2005). "Vénus et Adonis, 17 March 1697". L'Almanacco di Gherardo Casaglia (in Italian).
- Duron, Jean; Ferraton, Yves (2006). Vénus & Adonis (1697): Tragédie en musique de Henry Desmarest: livret, études et commentaires (in French). Centre de musique baroque de Versailles/Editions Mardaga. ISBN 2-87009-920-7.
- Girdlestone, Cuthbert (1972). La tragédie en musique, considéré comme genre littéraire. Geneva: Droz. OCLC 772775.
- Wood, Caroline (2001). "Desmarets [Desmarest, Desmaretz, Desmarais], Henry". Grove Music Online.
