= Charles Hardouin =

French opera singer

Charles Hardouin (1694 in Brittany, fl. Paris – 1718) was a French operatic baritone (basse taille).

Beginning his career as a cathedral singer, Hardouin was engaged by the Paris Opéra as a principal singer around 1693–1694, though from 1697 onwards he was eclipsed by the more powerful Gabriel-Vincent Thévenard. He was still singing in 1718 when he was acclaimed as Poliphème in Lully's Acis et Galatée.

== Roles created ==
- The grand priest in Destouches's Issé (Paris, 1697)
- Mars in Desmarets' Vénus et Adonis (Paris, 1697)
- Argante in André Campra's Tancrède (Paris, 1702)
- Cadmus in Marin Marais's Sémélé (Paris, 1709)
- Filindo/Héraclite in Campra's Les fêtes vénitiennes (Paris, 1710)
- Eole/Arbas in Campra's Idoménée (Paris, 1712)

== Sources ==
- Weller, Philip (1992), 'Hardouin' in The New Grove Dictionary of Opera, ed. Stanley Sadie (London) ISBN 0-333-73432-7
