= L'Europe galante =

1697 opéra-ballet by André Campra

L'Europe galante (Galant Europe) is an opéra-ballet in a prologue and four entrées by André Campra to a French libretto by Antoine Houdar de la Motte.

The opera is regarded as the first opéra-ballet, with the entrées sharing a common theme – in this case 'love' in four countries, France (entrée 1), Spain (entrée 2), Italy (entrée 3) and Turkey (entrée 4) – rather than a common narrative.

== Performance history ==
L'Europe Galante was first performed on 24 October 1697 by the Paris Opéra in the Salle du Palais-Royal in Paris. It was successful and was revived periodically until 1775. In 1997 – on the 300th anniversary of its creation – Istanbul Baroque led by Leyla Pınar staged L'Europe Galante in Istanbul Dolmabahçe Palace. They then toured it to the Brussels Printemps baroque du Sablon festival the same year.

== Roles ==
Roles, voice types, premiere cast
Role	Voice type	Premiere cast, 24 October 1697 Conductor: Marin Marais
Vénus (prologue)	soprano	Clément
La Discorde (prologue)	taille (baritenor)	Claude Desvoyes
Philène (1)	haute-contre (high tenor)	Jean Boutelou
Silvandre (1)	bass	Gabriel-Vincent Thévenard
Céphise (1)	soprano	Marie-Louise Desmatins
Doris (1)	soprano	Dupeyré
Dom Carlos (2)	bass	Charles Hardouin
Dom Pédro (2)	haute-contre (high tenor)	Pierre Chopelet
Octavio (3)	haute-contre (high tenor)	Louis Gaulard Dumesny
Olympia (3)	soprano	Fanchon Moreau
Zuliman (4)	bass	Gabriel-Vincent Thévenard
Roxane (4)	soprano	Marie Le Rochois
Zäide (4)	soprano	Marie-Louise Desmatins
