= Polyxène et Pirrhus =

Opera by Pascal Collasse

Polyxène et Pirrhus (Polyxena and Pyrrhus) is an opera by the French composer Pascal Collasse, first performed at the Académie Royale de Musique (the Paris Opéra) on 21 October 1706. It takes the form of a tragédie lyrique in a prologue and five acts. The libretto is by Jean-Louis-Ignace de La Serre.

== Sources ==
- (in French) Libretto at "Livrets baroques"
- (in French) Félix Clément and Pierre Larousse Dictionnaire des Opéras, Paris, 1881, p.538.
