= Didon (Desmarets) =

1693 opera by Louise-Geneviève Gillot de Saintonge and Henri Desmarets

Didon is a tragédie en musique or opera in a prologue and five acts by librettist, Louise-Geneviève Gillot de Saintonge, and composer Henri Desmarets. The 1693 opera was heavily influenced by Jean-Baptiste Lully's Armide and the music of both Marc-Antoine Charpentier and Henri Dumont.

== Performance history ==
Didon was premiered successfully by the Académie Royale de Musique at the Théâtre du Palais-Royal in Paris on 5 June 1693. The work was reprised on the following 11 September in the presence of Louis, Grand Dauphin, and revived again on the Paris stage in 1704 and 1705.

On 10 July 1999 the first modern revival of the opera was mounted at the Festival de Beaune by Les Talens Lyriques with conductor and harpsichordist Christophe Rousset. They presented the opera later that year at the Arsenal de Metz and the L'Opéra of the Palace of Versailles. The performance from Versailles on 9 October 1999 was broadcast live on France Musique, and a CD of the live recording was later issued. The German premiere of the opera took place at the Kiel Opera House in 2007.

== Roles ==
Role	Voice type	Premiere cast, 5 June 1693
Didon, Queen of Carthage	soprano	Marie Le Rochois
Énée	haute-contre	Louis Gaulard Dumesny
Iarbe, King of Gaetulia	bass	Jean Dun
Anne	soprano	Fanchon Moreau
Barcé	soprano	Françoise Dujardin
Magician	soprano	Julie d'Aubigny
Pleasure	haute-contre	Jean Boutelou
Glory	soprano	
Fame	soprano	Marie-Catherine Poussin
Jupiter	bass	Labbé
Mercure	taille	Claude Desvoyes
Mars	bass	Charles Hardouin
Vénus	soprano	Françoise Dujardin
Servant of Sychée	bass	
Arcas	taille	Poussin
Acate	bass	Moreau
Furie	soprano	
Three nymphs	sopranos	
Two dryads	sopranos	
Two Carthaginians	hautes-contres	
A faun	bass	

== Synopsis ==
Although betrothed to Iarbe, Didon is in preparation to wed Énée. Humiliated and dreading the impending wedding, Iarbe contacts his father, the god Jupiter. Jupiter promises him vengeance and Énée is forced to leave for the conquest of Italy. Didon and Énée lament their parting. Carthage comes under the pressure of the god Mercury. Didon loses all hope, becomes insane, and commits suicide.
