= Les fêtes vénitiennes =

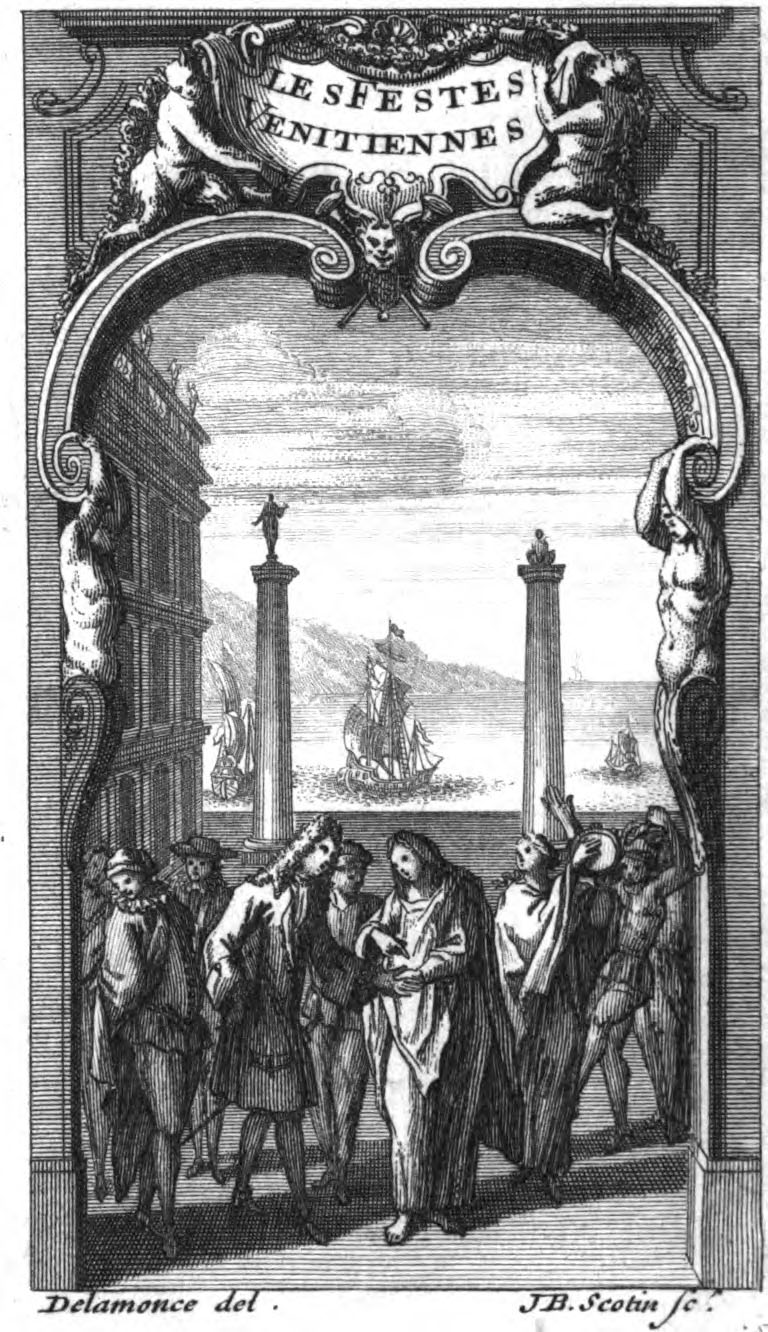
Les Festes vénitiennes, plate introducing the reprint of the libretto in Recueil general des opera...

Les festes vénitiennes ("Venetian Festivities"), also spelled Les fêtes vénitiennes, is an opéra-ballet by the French composer André Campra. It consists of a prologue (later sometimes omitted, abridged or replaced) and three entrées (four or five in subsequent versions). All versions of the libretto are by Antoine Danchet. It was first performed on 17 June 1710 by the Académie royale de musique in the Salle du Palais-Royal in Paris. According to the usage of the time, it was originally simply billed as a "ballet", but it is one of the most important and successful instances of the new genre later classified by scholars as opéra-ballet, which had become popular in Paris around the end of the 17th century.

== Performance history ==
At the beginning of the 18th century, the Paris Opéra public was growing dissatisfied with the traditional "operatic fare consisting of lyric tragedies cast invariably in the mould created by Lully and Quinault", and the innovative nature of the opéra-ballet, with its realistic locations and characters, and its comic plots, was seen as a viable alternative. The format of the new genre was exceedingly flexible: each entrée had its own independent intrigue and characters, and the various acts were loosely linked together by a tenuous thread (in Les festes vénitiennes, the Venice location).

Campra and Danchet's opera proved incredibly popular from the beginning, and, through a trial and error approach, "it perpetuated itself to the point where new entrées were written to replace the acts that seemed to be losing their appeal". Between June and December 1710, Campra and Danchet experimented with a total of two prologues and eight entrées and the opera ran for several dozen performances, reaching its 51st mounting on 14 October when it was restructured in a version with a shortened prologue and four entrées (which were to become five in the following month of December).

After its unprecedented success in 1710-1711, the opera was regularly revived over the next half-century (in 1712, 1713, 1721, 1731-1732, 1740, 1750-1751 and 1759), the different entrées being swapped around at various times, and provided ample opportunity for almost all the major artists who appeared on the stage of the Paris Opéra in this period. Eventually, it chalked up the incredible number of about three hundred performances.

== Roles ==
Roles	Voice type	Premiere Cast, 17 June 1710 (Conductor: Louis de La Coste)
Prologue: "Le Triomphe de la Folie sur la Raison dans le temps de Carnaval" ("The triumph of Folly over Reason during the Carnival")
Folly	soprano	Marie-Catherine Poussin
Reason	soprano	Mlle Desmatins
Carnival	bass-baritone	Gabriel-Vincent Thévenard
Héraclite	bass-baritone	Charles Hardouin
Démocrite	taille (baritenor)	Louis Mantienne
First entrée: "La feste des barqueroles" ("The festival of boaters")
A Venice doctor	bass-baritone	Jean Dun 'père'
Lilla	soprano	Mlle Dun
Damiro	haute-contre (high tenor)	Jacques Cochereau
A (female) gondolier, representing Victory	soprano	Mlle Hacqueville (or D'Huqueville)
A (male) gondolier	haute-contre	Guesdon
Second entrée: "Les sérénades et les joueurs" ("Serenades and players")
Léandre	bass-baritone	Gabriel-Vincent Thévenard
Isabelle	soprano	Françoise Journet
Lucile	soprano	Mlle Pestel
Irène	soprano	Mlle Dun
Fortune	soprano	Françoise Dujardin
A follower of Fortune	haute-contre	Jean-Baptiste Buseau
Third entrée: "Les saltinbanques de la place St Marc ou L'Amour saltinbanque" ("The acrobats of St Mark's Square, or Cupid the acrobat")
Filindo	bass-baritone	Charles Hardouin
Eraste	haute-contre	Jacques Cochereau
Léonore	soprano	Marie-Catherine Poussin
Nérine (travesti)	taille	Louis Mantienne
Amour acrobat (travesti)	soprano	Mlle Dun
First entrée added at a later date: "La feste marine" ("The marine festival")		First performed on 8 July 1710
Astophe	bass-baritone	Jean Dun 'père'
Dorante	haute-contre	Jacques Cochereau
Cephise	soprano	Françoise Journet
Doris	soprano	Mlle Dun
A mariner	haute-contre	Guesdon
Second entrée added at a later date: "Le bal ou le maître à danser" ("The dance, or the dancing master")		First performed on 8 August 1710
Alamir	bass-baritone	Gabriel-Vincent Thévenard
Themir	haute-contre	Jean-Baptiste Buseau
Iphise	soprano	Françoise Journet
A master of music	taille	Louis Mantienne
A master of dance	dancer/taille	François-Robert Marcel
A masker	haute-contre	(not stated)
Third entrée added at a later date: "Les devins de la Place St Marc" ("The fortune-tellers of St Mark's Square")		First performed on 5 September 1710
Lèandre	bass-baritone	Gabriel-Vincent Thévenard
Zélie	soprano	Marie-Catherine Poussin
A gipsy woman	soprano	Mlle Dun
Fourth entrée added at a later date: "L'Opéra ou le maître à chanter" ("The Opera, or the singing master")		First performed on 14 October 1710
Damire (Boreas)	bass-baritone	Charles Hardouin
Adolphe/An actor of the Opera performing Zephyr	haute-contre	Jean-Baptiste Buseau
Leontine (Flore)	soprano	Françoise Journet
Lucie (A shepherdess)	soprano	Mlle Dun
The singing master	haute-contre	(not stated)
Rodolphe	bass-baritone	Courteil
Fifth entrée added at a later date: "Le triomphe de la Folie" ("The triumph of Folly")		First performed in December 1710
Harlequin	dancer/taille	François Dumoulin
Folly	soprano	Marie-Catherine Poussin
A doctor	bass-baritone	Jean Dun 'père'
A Spaniard (man)	haute-contre	Jacques Cochereau
A Frenchman	bass-baritone	Gabriel-Vincent Thévenard
Columbine	soprano	Mlle Dun
Another Spaniard (man)	taille	?
A Spanish girl	soprano	?
