= Roland (Lully) =

Opera by Jean-Baptiste Lully

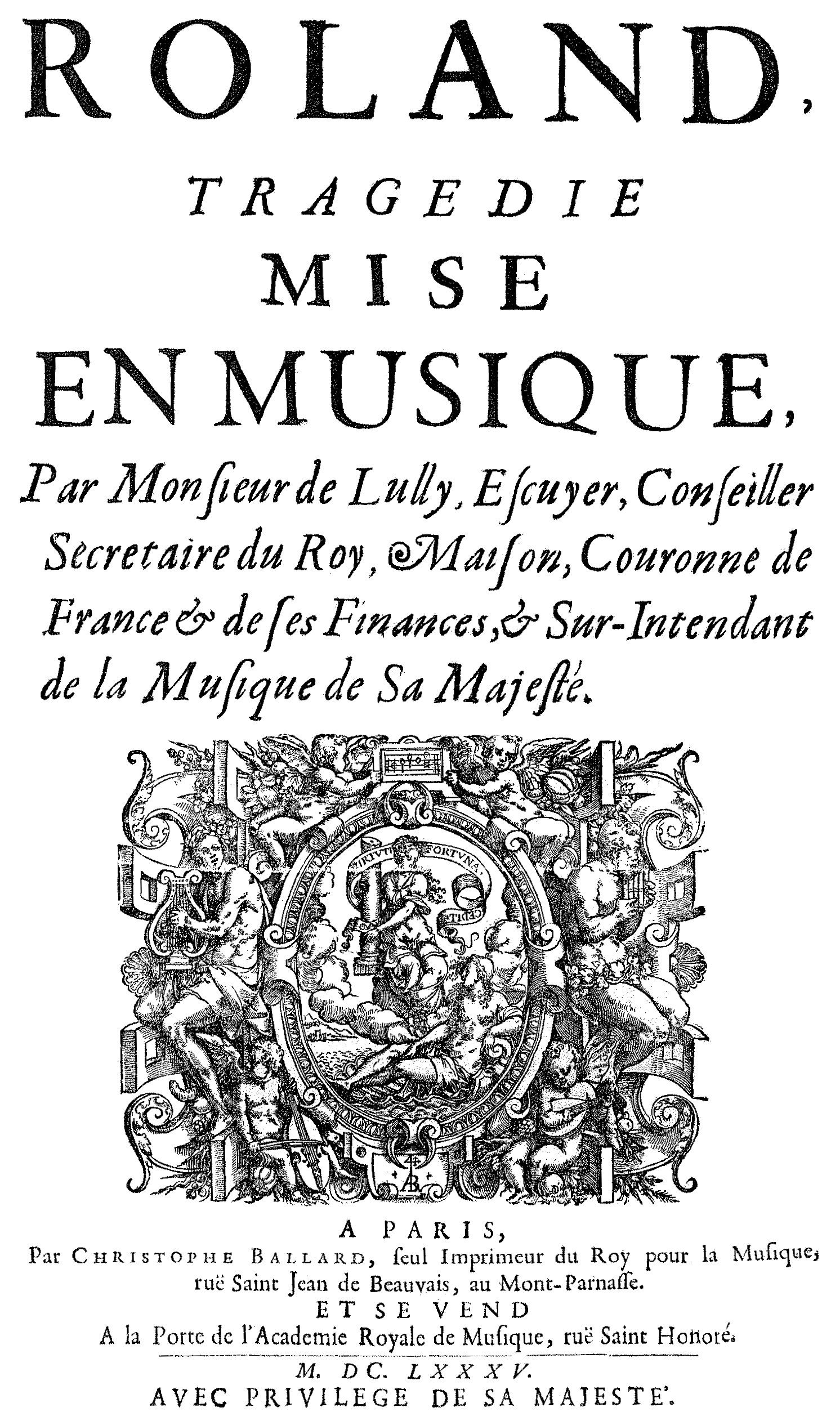
Roland (title page)

Roland is an opera with music by Jean-Baptiste Lully and a libretto by Philippe Quinault. It was first performed on January 8, 1685, at the Palace of Versailles by the Académie Royale de Musique (Paris Opera) and later, beginning on March 8, 1685, at the company's public theatre in Paris, the Théâtre du Palais-Royal. The story is derived from Ariosto's epic poem Orlando Furioso. The opera takes the form of a tragédie en musique with an allegorical prologue and five acts.

== Roles ==
Role	Voice type	Premiere Cast January 8, 1685 (Conductor: – )
Roland (Orlando)	bass	François Beaumavielle
Angélique (Angelica)	soprano	Marie Le Rochois
Médor (Medoro)	haute-contre	Louis Gaulard Dumesny
Témire	soprano	Mlle Armand
Astolfe (Astolfo)	haute-contre	
Logistille (Logistilla)	soprano	
Demogorgon	bass	

There is also a chorus of Fairies, Islanders, Shepherds and Shepherdesses, Heroes and followers of Glory.

== Synopsis ==
The opera opens with an allegorical prologue in which Démogorgon, King of the Fairies, sings the praises of Louis XIV and asks to see the story of the famous paladin Roland. Roland, the nephew of Charlemagne loves Angélique, the daughter of the King of Cathay, but, unbeknown to him, she is in love with Médor, a soldier in the army of Africa. In Act One, Roland gives Angélique a magic bracelet as a token of his love. In Act Two, Angélique approaches the Fountain of Love in a forest. When she catches sight of Roland, she uses a magic ring to make herself invisible and Roland wanders off in despair. Médor then arrives and in a soliloquy reveals he too is desperately in love with Angélique, so much so he is planning to kill himself. At that moment Angélique reveals herself and confesses her love for him. But she worries that Roland will be provoked to fury if he finds out. In Act Three, Angélique and Médor plan to flee from the clutches of Roland after a hasty wedding. The following act finds Roland in despair when Angélique is nowhere to be found. He comes across the names of Angélique and Médor carved on the walls of a cave. He hears the sound of a village wedding nearby. The villagers tell him of Médor and Angélique's escape and show him Roland's bracelet which the couple gave them in gratitude for letting them stay in the village. Roland plunges into madness. In the final act, under the influence of the fairy Logistille the sleeping Roland is visited by dreams of ancient heroes who urge him to give up his futile love for Angélique and return to the Christian army. Roland awakes, having recovered his reason and his desire for glory and rides off to battle amid a general triumph.

== Background and performance history ==
Unlike the majority of Lully's tragédies, Roland is not based on Classical mythology but on tales of medieval chivalry. This is also the case for the operas which preceded and followed it: Amadis (1684) and Armide (1686). Lully and Quinault's operas generally reflected the thinking of their patron, Louis XIV. The king had recently come under the influence of the pious Madame de Maintenon and had reaffirmed his religious faith and his desire to impose Catholic orthodoxy on France. He was even referred to as the "new Charlemagne" in a sermon preached by Bossuet in the same month as the opera's premiere. Thus the Christian knight Roland's rediscovery of his sacred mission was an ideal subject for the times. There was a patriotic motive too: although the story was derived from an Italian poem, Roland had been born in France and was the hero of the epic La Chanson de Roland, one of the earliest works of French literature.

The opera premiered in the stables at Versailles, which had been specially adapted for the occasion. In March of the same year, it was given at the theatre of the Palais Royal, Paris, and enjoyed great success. Revivals would continue well into the 18th century. In 1778, Marmontel adapted the libretto for a new setting by Piccinni (Gluck and Rameau had also considered producing a new version). The theme of the "madness of Roland" proved attractive to later composers too. Notable examples include Orlando finto pazzo (1714) and Orlando furioso (1727) by Vivaldi, Orlando (1732) by Handel, and Orlando paladino (1782) by Haydn.

== Recordings ==
- Roland (complete): Nicolas Testé (Roland), Anna Maria Panzarella (Angélique), Olivier Dumait (Médor), Logistille (Salomé Haller); Les Talens Lyriques, Christophe Rousset (Ambroisie, 2004)
- Roland's monologue in Act Four was recorded by the bass Olivier Lallouette on Les Divertissements de Versailles, a CD of Lully's music by Les Arts Florissants conducted by William Christie (Erato, 2002).
