= Marie Antier =

French opera singer

Marie Antier (1687 in Lyon, the Lyonnais – 3 December 1747 in Paris) was a French opera singer (soprano).

She was trained in singing and acting by Marthe Le Rochois. She made her debut at the Paris Opera in a revival of La vénitienne by Michel de la Barre in 1710 or 1711. It has been said that she was particularly adept in her portrayals of enchantresses or magicians in the works of Jean-Baptiste Lully. Over the course of thirty years she appeared in sixty stage works. In some of these works she played multiple parts, resulting in a repertoire of about eighty roles.

She was a premier actress of the Academie de Musique (1720) and a court singer (1721). She played the leading roles of French opera from her debut in 1711 until her retirement in 1741.

== Sources ==
- Saide, Julie ann (2001). "Antier, Marie". Grove music Online. Oxford University Press.
- Pitou, Spire (1983). The Paris Opéra: An Encyclopedia of Operas, Ballets, Composers, and Performers: Genesis and Glory, 1671-1715. Wesport, CT: Greenwood Press. ISBN 9780313243943.
