= Antoine Danchet =

French playwright, librettist and dramatic poet

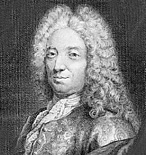
Antoine Danchet

Antoine Danchet (7 September 1671 – 21 February 1748) was a French playwright, librettist and dramatic poet.

== Biography ==
Danchet was born in Riom, in the Auvergne, France. Having been a professor of rhetoric at Chartres and then a tutor at Paris, Danchet gave up teaching to write for the theatre. He wrote some opera libretti which, set to music by André Campra, met with success. By contrast, his tragedies, mediocre imitations of Racine, almost all failed. He died in Paris.

An associate member of the Académie des inscriptions et belles-lettres from 1705, he was elected to the Académie française in 1712 thanks to the patronage of Mesdames de Ferriol et de Tencin. Voltaire wrote an epigram about him stating that his membership was more for his good deeds than his writing.

He died in Paris. His works, published in 1751 include, in addition to dramatic works, odes, cantatas, and letters. In 1781, Wolfgang Amadeus Mozart and Giambattista Varesco wrote the opera Idomeneo which was originally a Danchet work.

== Principal works ==
- Hésione (1700);
- Tancrède (1702);
- Cyrus (1706);
- Les Tyndarides (1708);
- Les fêtes vénitiennes (1710);
- Les Héraclides (1719);
- Nitétis (1724).
