= The New Grove Dictionary of Opera =

Encyclopedia of opera

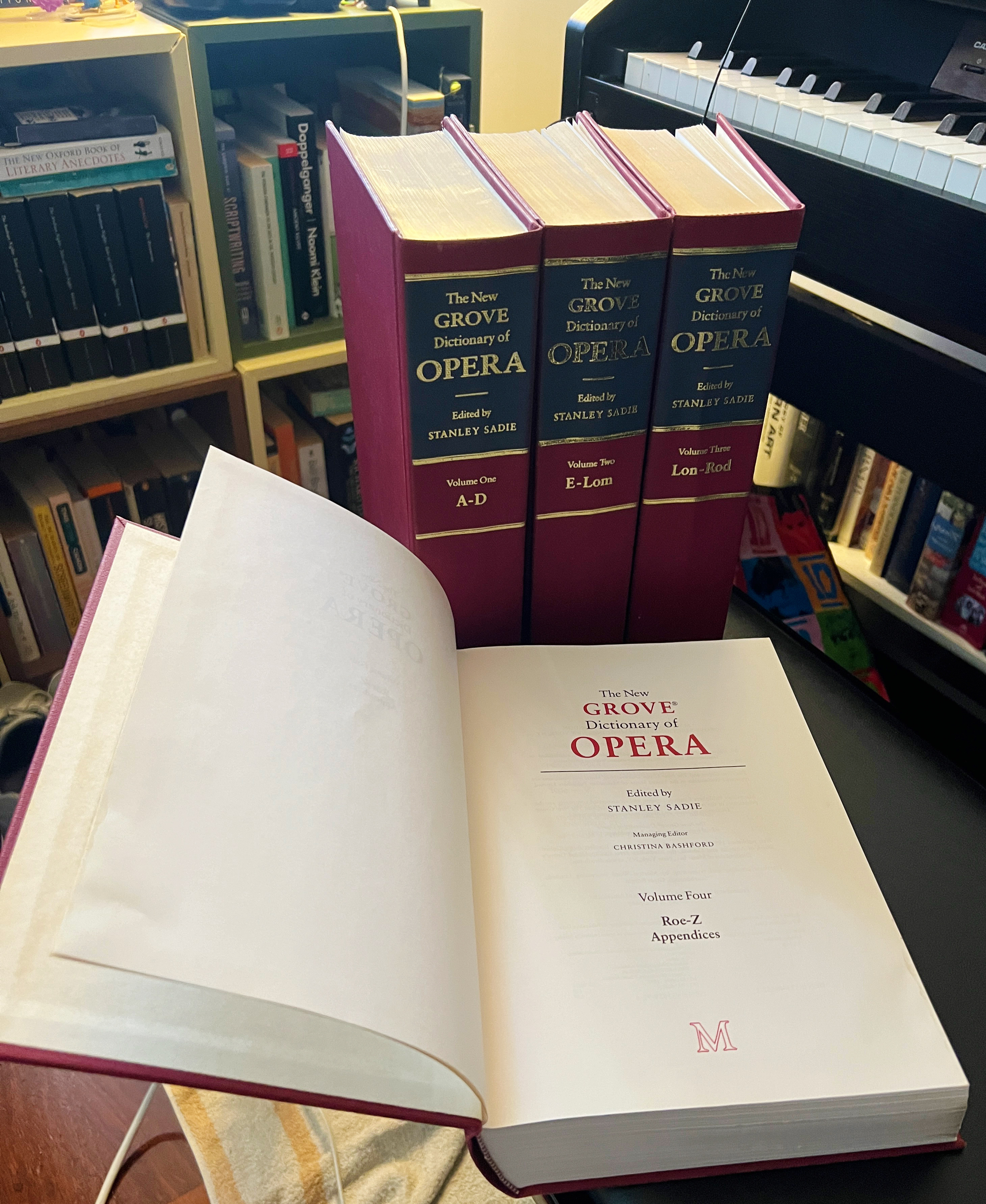
4 volumes of The New Grove Dictionary of Opera

The New Grove Dictionary of Opera is an encyclopedia of opera. It is the largest work on opera in English, and in its printed form, amounts to 5,448 pages in four volumes.

The dictionary was first published in 1992 by Macmillan Reference, London, and edited by Stanley Sadie. Christina Bashford was the managing editor. While some entries were based on their equivalent entry in The New Grove Dictionary of Music and Musicians, most were specially commissioned. The work contains contributions from over 1,300 scholars, with 11,000 articles in total, covering over 2,900 composers and 1,800 operas. The operas discussed range from the earliest operas in 16th century Italy to the 1992 Philip Glass work The Voyage.

The final volume includes four appendices: an index of principal role names in 850 notable operas; an index of incipits of arias and ensembles (first line only, no musical examples); a list of contributors; and illustration acknowledgements.

In 1997, the dictionary was acquired by Oxford University Press and reprinted. The dictionary was originally available online in a web version of its original form but has now been merged as part of Oxford's Grove Music Online which comprises the range of Grove Dictionary titles with some ongoing revisions.
