= Pascal Collasse =

French composer (c.1649–1709)

Pascal Collasse (or Colasse) (22 January 1649 (baptised) – 17 July 1709) was a French composer of the Baroque era. Born in Rheims, Collasse became a disciple of Jean-Baptiste Lully during the latter's domination of the French operatic stage. When Lully died in 1687 leaving his tragédie en musique Achille et Polyxène unfinished, Collasse completed the last four acts of the score. He went on to produce around a dozen operas and ballets, as well as sacred music, including settings of the Cantiques spirituels of Jean Racine. His plan to establish his own opera house in Lille ended in failure when the theatre burnt down. He dabbled in alchemy with even less success. His musical style is close to that of Lully.

== Works ==
La Naissance de Vénus (1696).

- Achille et Polyxène, tragédie lyrique, (overture and first act by Jean-Baptiste Lully) 1687
- Thétis et Pélée, tragédie lyrique, 1689
- Sigalion ou le secret, ballet (collège Louis-le-Grand), 1689
- Énée et Lavinie, tragédie lyrique, 1690
- Astrée, tragédie lyrique, 1691
- Le Ballet de Villeneuve-Saint-Georges, ballet, 1692
- Les saisons, opéra-ballet, 1695
- La naissance de Vénus, 1696
- Jason ou La toison d’or, tragédie lyrique, 1696
- Canente, tragédie lyrique, 1700
- Polyxène et Pirrhus, tragédie lyrique, 1706

== Sources ==
- The Viking Opera Guide
