= Henri Desmarets =

French composer (1661–1741)

- Born: February 1661; Paris, France
- Died: 7 September 1741 (aged 80)
- Era: Baroque

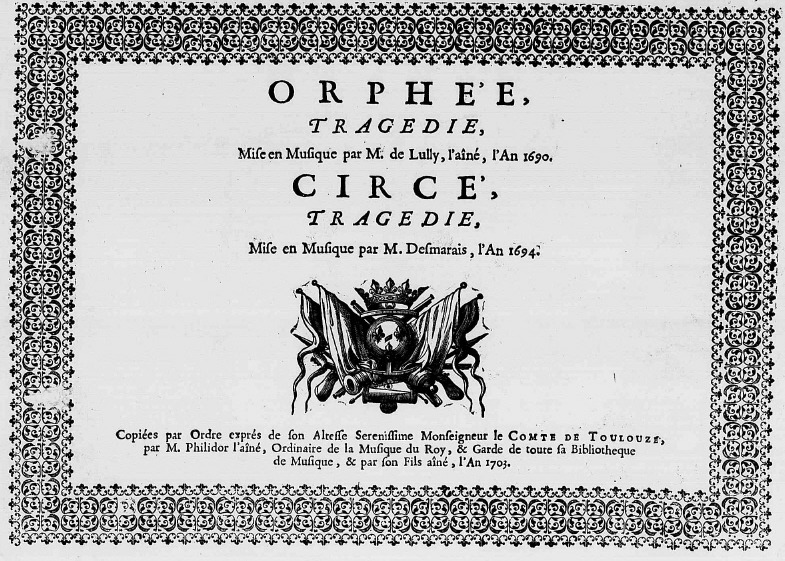
Title page of the scores for Louis Lully's Orphée and Henri Desmarets' Circé, published by Philidor in 1703

Henri Desmarets (French pronunciation: [ɑ̃ʁi demaʁɛ]; February 1661 – 7 September 1741) was a French composer of the Baroque period primarily known for his stage works, although he also composed sacred music as well as secular cantatas, songs and instrumental works.

== Biography ==
=== Early years and first successes ===
The Palace of Versailles, where Desmarets' opera Endymion was first performed in 1686

Henri Desmarets was born into a modest Paris household in February 1661. His mother, Madeleine née Frottier, came from a bourgeois Parisian family. His father, Hugues Desmarets was a huissier in the cavalry at the Grand Châtelet. Desmarets' childhood was marked by his father's death when he was eight years old, his mother's subsequent remarriage in 1670, and the death of his two siblings. In 1674, he entered into the service of King Louis XIV as a page and choir singer in the Chapelle Royale (Chapel Royal). According to Duron and Ferraton, he may have also previously sung as a choir boy in Saint-Germain l'Auxerrois which was the parish church of the kings of France. While in the service of the king, he received a general education as well as music training from Pierre Robert and Henry Du Mont. He is also thought to have received training from the court composer Jean-Baptiste Lully, who used the chapel pages as performers in his operas. By 1680 he had become an "ordinaire de la musique du roi" (court musician) and had composed the first of his grand motets (Te Deum 1678). The idyll-ballet which he composed in August 1682 to celebrate the birth of the king's grandson, the Duke of Burgundy, found great favour at court and the following year he entered the competition to select four maîtres (masters) of the Chapelle Royale. He was only 22 at the time and according to some accounts, the King had vetoed his selection after he had passed the first round on account of his youth.

After the competition, Desmarets petitioned the king to allow him to leave France for study with Italian composers, but Lully objected on the grounds that it would diminish his command of the French style. Desmarets remained at the court and made money by "ghost-writing" works for one of the composers who had won the competition, Nicolas Goupillet. Goupillet was dismissed from his post ten years later when the deception came to light. In the meantime, Desmarets continued to find favour with his own compositions, most notably his motet Beati quorum (1683); his divertissement, La Diane de Fontainebleau (1686) and his first full-length opera, Endymion (1686). The first performance of Endymion was in the king's private apartments at Versailles, performed in parts over six days. The Dauphine was so pleased with it that at her request it was performed again in its entirety at the court theatre ten days later. Desmarets was increasingly gravitating towards stage works, but the king had granted Lully a monopoly on performances at the Académie Royale de Musique in Paris, so that operas by other composers were not presented there until after Lully died in 1687.

=== Operas on the Paris stage and scandal in Senlis ===
Desmarets' Te Deum was performed in the oratory of the Louvre Palace in February 1687 to celebrate Louis XIV's recovery from illness, and later that year the king granted him a pension of 900 livres. Desmarets married Élisabeth Desprez, the daughter of a Parisian blade manufacturer, in 1689, and the following year their daughter, Élisabeth-Madeleine, was born. He became the Chapel Master of the Jesuit college Louis-le-Grand in 1693 and premiered his opera Didon in June of that year. It was the first of his stage works to be performed at the Académie Royale de Musique. Over the next two years three more of his operas premiered there: Circé (1694), Théagène et Cariclée (1695), and Les amours de Momus (1695).

In the summer of 1696, Élisabeth Desmarets died, leaving him with six-year-old Élisabeth-Madeleine to parent. Desmarets became a frequent visitor to the Saint-Gobert family in Senlis, who offered to help him take care of Élisabeth-Madeleine. Both families had been friends since 1689, and Desmarets had given singing lessons to Marie-Marguerite de Saint-Gobert when she was fifteen. During these visits, Desmarets and the now eighteen-year-old Marie-Marguerite fell in love and within six months of his wife's death, they asked her father, Jacques de Saint-Gobert, for permission to marry. He flatly refused and put his daughter in a convent when he discovered that she was pregnant. In the midst of all this, Desmarets was preparing his opera Vénus et Adonis for its 1697 premiere. The lovers eloped to Paris and Marie-Marguerite gave birth to a son in February 1698.

=== Exile ===
After the elopement, nearly three years of complicated court cases ensued with Marie-Marguerite's father accusing her mother, Marie-Charlotte de Saint-Gobert, of complicity in the affair. She in turn accused her husband of attempting to poison her. Saint-Gobert disinherited his daughter and had Desmarets charged with seduction and kidnapping. Desmarets and Marie-Maguerite fled to Brussels before he could be arrested, leaving his opera Iphigénie en Tauride unfinished. He was eventually condemned to death in absentia in May 1700. With no possibility of returning to France, Desmarets took a position in Spain as the court composer to Philip V. There he and Marguerite were officially married. He left Spain in 1707 to become the master of music at the court of Leopold, Duke of Lorraine at the Château de Lunéville. (At the time, Lorraine was not officially part of France.) While he was in exile, his friends Jean-Baptiste Matho and Anne Danican Philidor kept his artistic reputation alive in France by ensuring that his works continued to be performed and published there. André Campra completed Iphigénie en Tauride for him and it premiered in Paris in 1704.

=== Final years ===
Desmarets was finally pardoned by the French Regent in 1720, and his second marriage was officially recognized. He applied to become the master of the Chapelle Royale at the court of Louis XV in 1726, but was unsuccessful and remained in Lorraine for the rest of his days. Desmarets died in Lunéville on 7 September 1741 in his 80th year and was buried there in the convent church of the Sisters of Saint Elisabeth. Marie-Marguerite had died fourteen years earlier. Only two of their many children survived them, Francois-Antoine (1711–1786), who became a high-ranking official in Senlis and Léopold (1708-1747), who became a cavalry officer and for many years was the lover of novelist and playwright Françoise de Graffigny. Élisabeth-Madeleine took care of him in his old age and died a few months after her father.

== Works ==
Both the music and the text for some of the works listed here have been lost. In other cases, only the libretto remains.

=== Stage works ===
- Idylle sur la naissance du duc de Bourgogne, idyll-ballet, text by Antoinette Deshoulières, 1682 (music lost)
- Endymion, opera (tragédie en musique) in 5 acts and a prologue, first performed at Versailles in separate parts between 16 and 23 February 1686 (lost)
- La Diane de Fontainebleau, divertissement, libretto by Antoine Maurel, first performed at Fontainebleau 2 November 1686
- Didon, opera (tragédie en musique) in 5 acts and a prologue, libretto by Louise-Geneviève Gillot de Saintonge, first performed at the Académie Royale de Musique 5 June 1693 (reprised 11 September in the presence of Louis, Grand Dauphin)
- Circé, opera (tragédie en musique) in 5 acts and a prologue, libretto by Louise-Geneviève Gillot de Saintonge, first performed at the Académie Royale de Musique on 1 October 1694
- Théagène et Chariclée, opera (tragédie en musique) in 5 acts and a prologue, libretto by Joseph-François Duché de Vancy, first performed at the Académie Royale de Musique on 12 April 1695
- Les amours de Momus, opéra-ballet in 3 acts and a prologue, story by Duché de Vancy, first performed at the Académie Royale de Musique on 12 June 1695
- Vénus et Adonis, opera (tragédie en musique) in 5 acts and a prologue, libretto by Jean-Baptiste Rousseau, first performed at the Académie Royale de Musique on 28 July 1697
- Les festes galantes, opéra-ballet in 3 acts and a prologue, story by Duché de Vancy, first performed at the Académie Royale de Musique on 10 May 1698
- Divertissement celebrating the marriage of Philip V of Spain and Maria Luisa of Savoy, libretto by Louise-Geneviève Gillot de Saintonge, first performed in Barcelona in October 1701 (lost)
- Iphigénie en Tauride, opera (tragédie en musique) in 5 acts and a prologue (completed by Campra), libretto by Duché de Vancy and Antoine Danchet, first performed at the Académie Royale de Musique 6 May 1704
- Renaud, ou La suite d’Armide, opera (tragédie en musique) in 5 acts and a prologue, libretto by Simon-Joseph Pellegrin, first performed 5 March 1722

=== Cantatas ===
- Le couronnement de la reine par la déesse Flore, text by Marchal, 1724 (music lost)
- Clytie, 1724 (music lost)
- Le lys heureux époux, text by Marchal, 1724 (music lost)
- La toilette de Vénus, text by Charles-Jean-François Hénault (date unknown, music lost)

== Anthems ==
- De profundis
- Te Deum from Paris
- Te Deum from Lyon
- Veni Creator
- Cum invocarem
- Deus in adjutorium
- Quemadmodum desiderat
- Beati omnes
- Nisi Dominus
- Exaudiat te Dominus
- Usquequo Domine from Lyon
- Usquequo Domine from Paris
- Lauda Jerusalem
- Domine ne in fuore
- Confitebor tibi Domine
- Dominus regnavit
- Mass for double chorus & double orchestra

== Sources ==
- Michel Antoine (1965), Henry Desmarest, Biographie critique, Paris Éditions A. et J. Picard & Cie (in French)
- Anthony, James R. and Heyer, John Hajdu (1989). Jean-Baptiste Lully and the Music of the French Baroque. Cambridge University Press. ISBN 0-521-35263-0
- Casaglia, Gherardo (2005). "Desmarets". L'Almanacco di Gherardo Casaglia (in Italian).
- Castil-Blaze (1855) L'Académie impériale de musique: histoire littéraire, musicale, politique et galante de ce théâtre, de 1645 à 1855 Volume I and Volume II (in French)
- Duron, Jean and Ferraton, Yves (2005). Henry Desmarest (1661-1741): Exils d'un musicien dans l'Europe du grand siècle. Editions Mardaga. ISBN 2-87009-886-3 (in French)
- Duron, Jean and Ferraton, Yves (2006). Vénus & Adonis (1697): Tragédie en musique de Henry Desmarest: livret, études et commentaires. Editions Mardaga. ISBN 2-87009-920-7 (in French)
- Fétis, François-Joseph (1836). "Desmarets, Henri", Biographie universelle des musiciens et bibliographie générale de la musique, Volume 3. Leroux (in French)
- Girdlestone, Cuthbert (1972). La Tragedie en Musique (1673–1750. Librairie Droz. ISBN 2-600-03520-6 (in French)
- Greene, David Mason (1986/2007). "Desmarets, Henri", Greene's Biographical Encyclopedia of Composers, pp. 186–187. Reproducing Piano Roll Foundation, 2007 (originally published by Collins, 1986). ISBN 0-385-14278-1
- Sadie, Julie Anne (1998). "Desmarets, Henry". Companion to Baroque Music. University of California Press. ISBN 0-520-21414-5
- Warszawski, Jean-Marc (2004). "Desmarets, Henri". musicologie.org. Accessed 5 February 2011. (in French)
- Wood, Caroline (2001) "Desmarets [Desmarest, Desmaretz, Desmarais], Henry". Grove Music Online. Accessed 5 February 2011. (subscription required). (Online version of The New Grove Dictionary of Music and Musicians, 2nd edition. ISBN 978-0-19-517067-2)
