= Ancient Airs and Dances =

Three orchestral suites by Ottorino Respighi

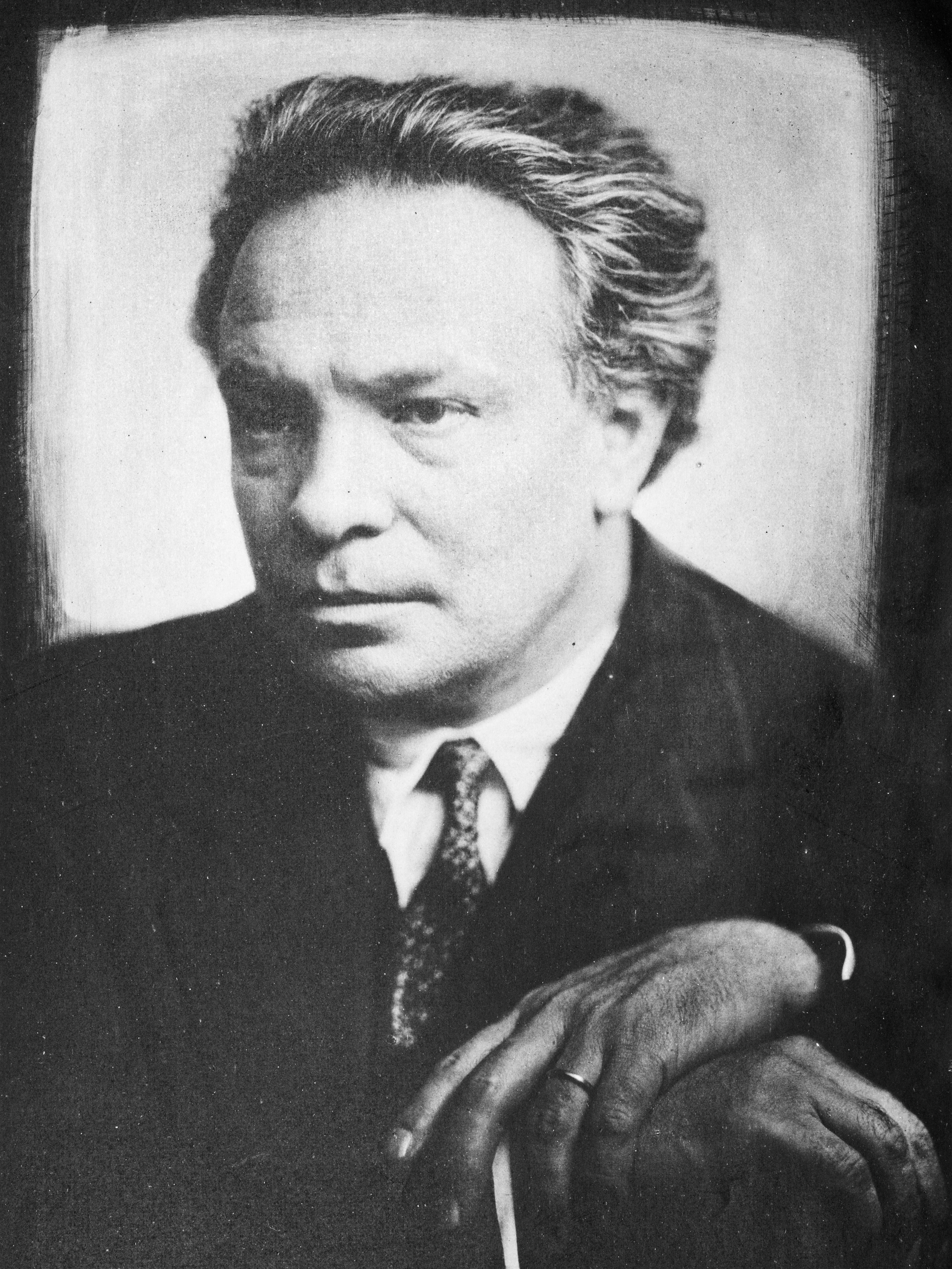
Ottorino Respighi in 1927

Ancient Airs and Dances (Italian: Antiche danze ed arie) is a set of three orchestral suites by Italian composer Ottorino Respighi, freely transcribed from original pieces for lute. In addition to being a renowned composer and conductor, Respighi was also a notable musicologist. His interest in music of the Renaissance and Baroque periods led him to compose works inspired by the music of these periods.

== Suite No. 1 (1917) ==
Ancient Airs, Suite No. 1
I. Balletto, "Il Conte Orlando"

II. Gagliarda

III. Villanella

IV. Passo mezzo e mascherada

Suite No. 1 P 109 was composed in 1917. It was based on Renaissance lute pieces by Simone Molinaro, Vincenzo Galilei (father of Galileo Galilei) and additional anonymous composers.

1. Balletto: "Il Conte Orlando" (Simone Molinaro, 1599)
2. Gagliarda (Vincenzo Galilei, 1550s)
3. Villanella (anonymous, end of 16th century)
4. Passo mezzo e mascherada (anonymous, end of 16th century)

The orchestration calls for 2 flutes, 2 oboes, English horn, 2 bassoons, 2 horns in F, trumpet in D, harp, harpsichord and strings.

== Suite No. 2 (1923) ==
Suite No. 2, P 138 was composed in 1923. It was based on pieces for lute, archlute, and viol by Fabritio Caroso, Jean-Baptiste Besard, Bernardo Gianoncelli, and an anonymous composer. It also includes an aria attributed to Marin Mersenne.

1. Laura soave: balletto con gagliarda, saltarello e canario (Fabritio Caroso)
2. Danza rustica (Jean-Baptiste Besard)
3. Campanae parisienses (anonymous) & Aria (attributed to Marin Mersenne)
4. Bergamasca (Bernardo Gianoncelli, 1650)

The orchestration calls for an average-sized orchestra of 3 flutes (3rd doubling piccolo), 2 oboes, English horn, 2 clarinets in A/B♭, 2 bassoons, 3 horns in D (doubling 2 horns in E/F), 2 trumpets in A/D (doubling trumpet in C), 3 trombones, 3 timpani, celesta, harpsichord 4-hands, harp and strings.

== Suite No. 3 (1931) ==
Suite No. 3, P 172 was composed in 1931. It differs from the previous two suites in that it is arranged for strings only and somewhat melancholy in overall mood. (A note by the composer in the printed score states that the work may also be performed by a string quartet, completely omitting the double-bass part.) It is based on lute songs by Besard, a piece for Baroque guitar by Ludovico Roncalli, and lute pieces by Santino Garsi da Parma and additional anonymous composers.

1. Italiana (Anonymous: Italiana (Fine sec. XVI) – Andantino)
2. Arie di corte (Jean-Baptiste Besard: Arie di corte (Sec. XVI) – Andante cantabile – Allegretto – Vivace – Lento con grande espressione – Allegro vivace – Vivacissimo – Andante cantabile)
3. Siciliana (Anonymous: Siciliana (Fine sec. XVI) – Andantino)
4. Passacaglia (Lodovico Roncalli: Passacaglia (1692) – Maestoso – Vivace)

== Transcriptions ==
The Ancient Airs and Dances first two suites were freely transcribed by the composer for piano (2 and 4 hands). In 2016, Dennis Janzer transcribed the set for the organ.

== Recordings ==
External audio
- You may hear Respighi's "Ancient Airs and Dances" with Neville Marriner conducting the Los Angeles Chamber Orchestra in 1976; Here on archive.org

There have been many recordings of the suites in their entirety, and individually, with Suite No. 3 most frequently appearing alone. Recordings include:

- Philharmonia Hungarica, Antal Dorati (Mercury)
- Boston Symphony Orchestra, Seiji Ozawa (DG)
- Los Angeles Chamber Orchestra, Sir Neville Marriner (EMI)
- Lausanne Chamber Orchestra, Jesús López-Cobos (Telarc)
- Saint Paul Chamber Orchestra, Hugh Wolff (Teldec)
- CBC Radio Orchestra, Mario Bernardi (CBC Enerprises)
- Australian Chamber Orchestra, Christopher Lyndon-Gee (Omega)
- Sinfonia 21, Richard Hickox (Chandos)
- Orpheus Chamber Orchestra (1 & 3 only) (DG)
- Rome Symphony Orchestra, Francesco La Vecchia
- Orchestre Philharmonique de Liège, John Neschling (BIS)

In 1987 Paul O'Dette released a recording of the original lute songs and dances on which Respighi based the suites.

=== Suite No. 3 only ===
- Berliner Philharmoniker, Herbert von Karajan (DG)
- I Musici
- Academy of St. Martin-in-the-Fields, Sir Neville Marriner (Philips)
- English String Orchestra, William Boughton (Nimbus)

== In popular culture ==
- The piece “Siciliana” was rearranged by Arnie Roth as the main theme for the animated film Barbie in the 12 Dancing Princesses.
- The Suite No. 3 was used as part of the soundtrack for the film The Tree of Life.
