= Mireille Lebel =

Canadian opera mezzo-soprano

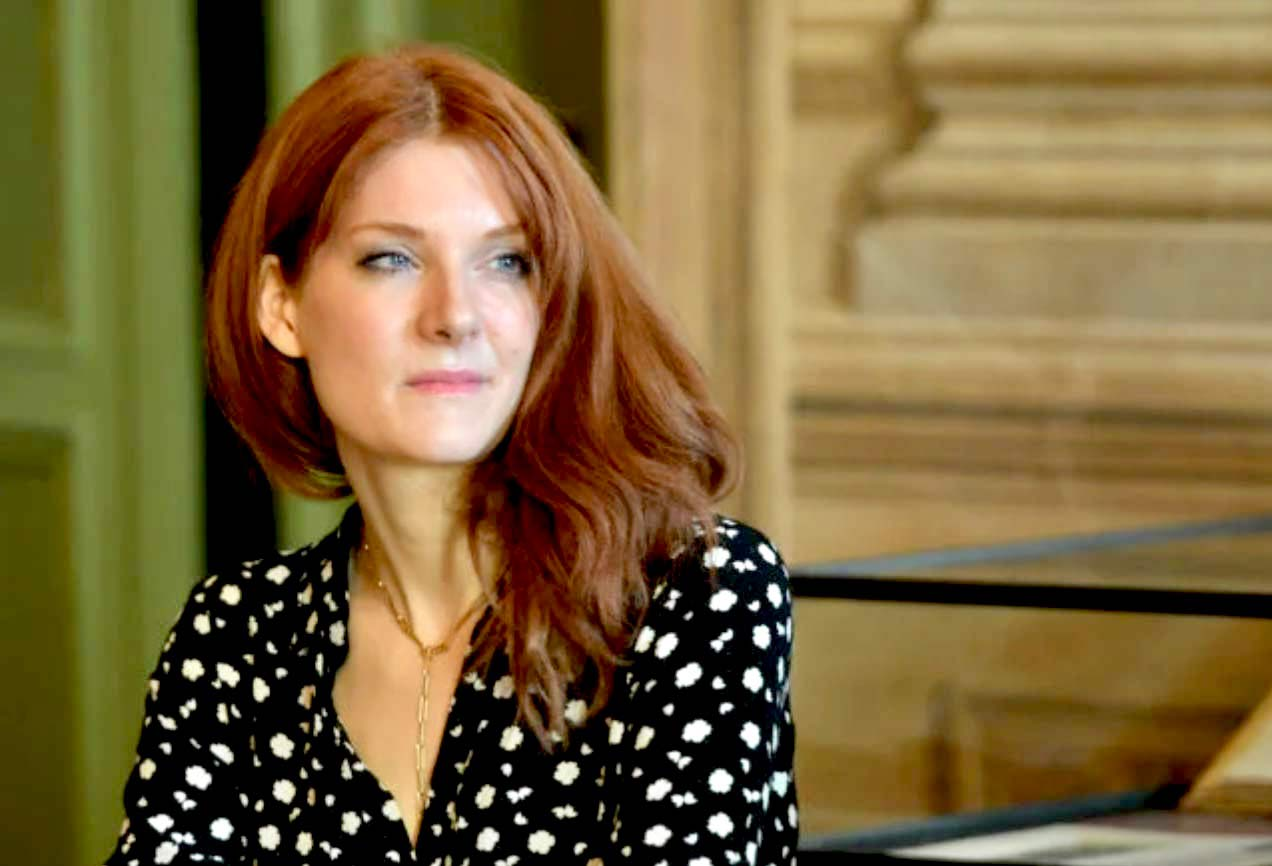
- Mireille Lebel, as Carmen
- Born: Calgary, Alberta, Canada
- Occupation: Opera singer (mezzo-soprano)
- Years active: 2007–present
- Website: mireillelebel.com

Mireille Lebel is a Canadian-born opera singer based in Berlin, Germany. Her voice is a lyrical mezzo with soprano colour in the high notes.

== Biography ==
Lebel was born in Calgary, Alberta, and raised in Vancouver, British Columbia. As a child, she trained in classical dance for nine years. She went on to study singing at the University of Toronto and the Université de Montréal. Following her studies she received grants from the Canada Council for the Arts and the Jacqueline Desmarais Foundation for Young Canadian Opera and was awarded a place on the Opéra de Montréal's Atelier Lyrique artist-in-residence program. She was a prize winner in Canada's Jeunes Ambassadeurs Lyriques Competition, and was subsequently offered a position in the Theater Erfurt's ensemble in Thuringia, Germany, in 2009. Since leaving Theater Erfurt in 2014, she has been making critically successful debuts with opera companies and orchestras across Europe and North America.

She notably performed as a soloist on the Boston Early Music Festival's 2015 Grammy Award winning recording of Charpentier's La descente d'Orphée aux enfers. Lebel has also appeared in the Czech Republic with the Prague State Opera, in France with the Aix-en-Provence Festival, in the USA with the Houston Symphony Orchestra, and in Canada with Toronto's Opera Atelier and Tafelmusik, Quebec's Les Violons du Roy, and the Vancouver Opera, amongst others. Her performances have included the title roles in Bizet's Carmen, Rossini's La Cenerentola (Cinderella), and Gluck/Berlioz's Orphée et Eurydice, along with Cherubino in Mozart's Le nozze di Figaro, and Sesto in Mozart's La clemenza di Tito, plus roles in contemporary operas such as Ana Sokolovic's Svadba (Marriage) and Hèctor Parra's Wilde. While living in Europe, she prepared for each role by having several sessions with her teacher, renowned soprano Marie McLaughlin.

Lebel sustained a serious burn injury in 2018 during the rehearsal period for Monteverdi's Il ritorno d'Ulisse in patria with Opera Atelier in Toronto. Following several surgeries at the Ross Tilley Burn Center at Sunnybrook Hospital, she managed to sing the entire run of the opera.

In 2020, when live performances were paused during the COVID-19 pandemic, Lebel put on a solo streaming production of Francis Poulenc's La voix humaine for the Vancouver Opera. In 2021, she sang the title role in the Vancouver Opera's all-female production of Orfeo ed Euridice.

Future seasons for Lebel include leading operatic roles (notable debuts include Octavian in Der Rosenkavalier with Joana Mallwitz conducting) as well as close collaborations with contemporary composers such as Samy Moussa, Ana Sokolovic, and Stacey Brown.

== Discography ==
- 2007 Boston Early Music Festival – Jean-Baptiste Lully's Thésée (Classic Produktion Osnabrück)
- 2008 Boston Early Music Festival – Jean-Baptiste Lully's Psyché (Classic Produktion Osnabrück)
- 2010 Boston Early Music Festival – Marc-Antoine Charpentier's Actéon (Classic Produktion Osnabrück)
- 2011 Boston Early Music Festival – John Blow's Venus and Adonis (Classic Produktion Osnabrück)
- 2014 Boston Early Music Festival – Marc-Antoine Charpentier's La descente d'Orphée aux enfers and La Couronne de fleurs (Classic Produktion Osnabrück)
- 2018 Philharmonisches Orchester Erfurt – Alois Bröder's Die Frauen der Toten (Dreyer Gaido)
- 2020 Richter Ensemble with Mireille Lebel – Vienna 1905–1910: Schoenberg, Webern, Berg: String Quartets (Passacaille)
- 2023 Boston Early Music Festival – Henri Desmarest's Circé (Classic Produktion Osnabrück)
