= Tigrane =

Tigrane may refer to:

- Tigranes the Great (140 – 55 BC) King of Armenia

== Music ==
- Tigrane, opera by Antonio Maria Bononcini 1710
- Tigrane (Scarlatti), 1715 opera
- Tigrane (Vivaldi), 1724 opera
- Tigrane (Hasse), 1729 opera
