= Hille Perl =

German musician

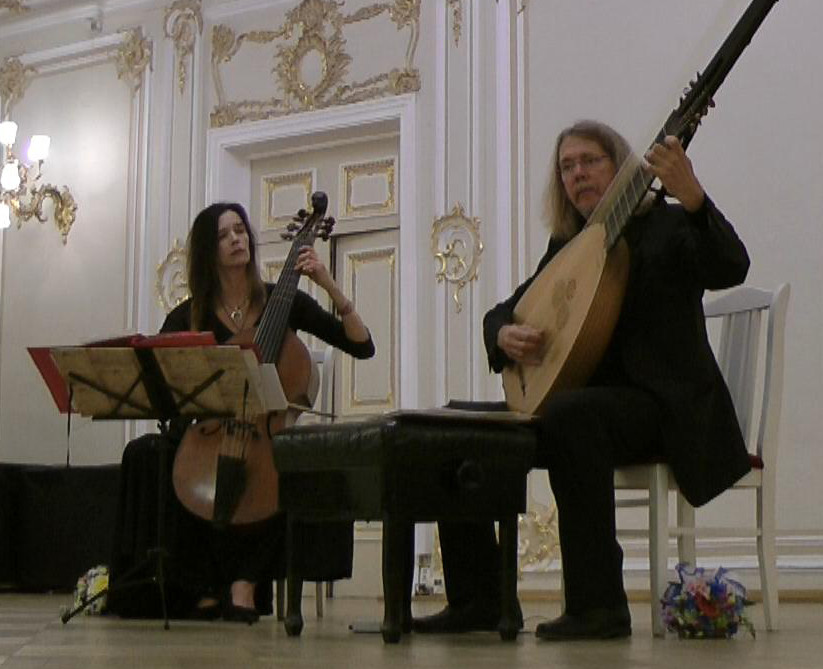
Hille Perl and Lee Santana at a concert in the Small Hall of the St. Petersburg Philharmonic. 10.25.2014..jpg

Hille Perl (born Hildegard Perl born 1965 in Bremen) is a German virtuoso performer of the viola da gamba and lirone.

== Biography ==
Her father Helmut Perl was an organist, musicologist and author who specialized in Mozart. She decided to play the viola da gamba after attending a Wieland Kuijken concert when she was five years old. She studied with Niklas Trüstedt (Berlin) and Pere Ros and Ingrid Stampa (Hamburg). Her daughter Marthe Perl (born 1983) and niece Sarah Perl also play viol.

She is considered to be one of the world's finest viola da gamba players, specializing in solo and ensemble music of the 17th and 18th centuries. She has a particular interest in French Baroque repertoire for seven-string bass viola da gamba. She also performs Spanish, Italian, German, and modern repertoire for the instrument and has released many CDs.

Her long-time performing partner is Lee Santana, who plays the lute, theorbo, chitarrone, and baroque guitar. In addition to an original 18th-century gamba made by Matthais Alban in Tyrol, 1687, she plays a seven-string Tielke replica made by Ingo Muthesius and a six-string Italian viol made by Claus Derenbach.

Her main instrument, the Alban viol, was discovered in 1952 in an Austrian convent, and was restored by Ingo Muthesius. Muthesius replaced the neck, while retaining the original lion's head scroll and peg box. Claus Derenbach has made a new bridge and fingerboard. The body remains original. Unusually, no sister instrument has been found to date, though the top-wood corresponds with violins surviving from Alban's workshop in Bozen, where he worked with his two sons until 1712. The instrument was bequeathed to Perl in the previous owner's will.

Perl lives with her family on a small farm in Lower Saxony and has been teaching since 2002 as a professor at the University of the Arts Bremen. She has co-founded several ensembles, including the Sirius Viols and Los Otros. She appeared in Michael Haneke's 2017 movie Happy End, playing viol.

== Discography ==
=== 1990s ===
- Retrouvé & Changé - Seven strings and more. Music by Sainte Colombe. DHM 05472 77373 2 (1997)
- J. S. Bach. Sonatas for Viola da gamba & Harpsichord BWV 1027-1029 with Michael Behringer. hänssler Classic CD 92.124 (1999)
- ...per la viola da gamba.... J.S. Bach. Suite per la viola da gamba re mineur BWV 1011/995, Trio in A major BWV 1025 after Silvius Weiss, Sonata in g minor BWV 1029. “Why these three pieces? Because they have never been done like this before. Because they are three totally different facets of an ingenious composer. Because my viola da gamba approach to them also shows three very different aspects of myself, and because three is my favorite number” (HP, back cover). DHM 05472 77515 2 (1999)

=== 2000s ===
- Doulce Memoire. Glosas, Passeggiati & Diminutions around 1600. DHM BMG Ariola 05472 77502 2 (2000)
- The Star and the Sea. Music by Lee Santana. Carpe Diem 16264 (2002)
- Tinto. Music by Santiago de Murcia, Antonio Martin y Coll, Francesco Corbetta, Girolamo Kapsberger, and Bartolomé de Selma y Salaverde. As one of Los Otros, with Lee Santana and Steve Player. DHM BMG 05472 77861 2 (2002)
- Why Not Here. English viol music with Friederike Heumann. Carpe Diem 16270 (2003). Reissued on Accent (Note 1 Music GmbH), 2016.
- Marin Marais. Pour la Violle et le Théorbe with Lee Santana. DHM BMG 82876 58791 2 (2004)
- Aguirre. Sebastián de Aguirre, Antonio Martín y Coll, Anthony Holborne, Santiago de Murcia, Gaspar Sanz, as one of Los Otros, with Lee Santana, Steve Player, Pedro Estevan. DHM BMG 82876 60489 2 (2004)
- Il Zazzerino. Music of Jacopo Peri. Ellen Hargis, soprano; Paul O'Dette, chitarrone; Andrew Lawrence-King, harp; Perl, lirone. Harmonia Mundi 907234 (2005-12-29)
- Telemann: Gambenkonzerte. La Viola da Gamba Concertata. Music by Georg Philipp Telemann: sonata in b, concerto in E, concerto in A, suite in d, concerto in G. With the Freiburger Barockorchester, directed by Petra Müllejans, also principal violin. DHM Sony BMG 82876850552 (2006)
- In darkness let me dwell. Music by John Dowland. With Dorothee Mields, soprano; Lee Santana, lute; Sirius Viols (Frauke Hess, Julianne Laake, Hille, Sarah, and Marthe Perl), gambas. DHM 88697225022 (2008)
- La Hacha. An Ibero-Mexican Fandango. Music by Diego Ortiz, Gaspar Sanz, Leopoldo Novoa, Santiago de Murcia, Lucas Ruiz de Ribayaz, and from the Canionero de Uppsala, Codice Saldivar 2, and more. As one of Los Otros, with Steve Player and Lee Santana, and also with the Tembembe Ensamble Continuo. DHM Sony BMG 88697026202 (2008)
- IIdia: Arias, Madrigals and Laments. Music by Sigismondo d'India. Gudrun Anders (soprano), Sigrun Richter (arciliut, chitarrone), Perl (viola da gamba, lirone). Christophorus 01342 (2008-08-11)
- Les Voix Humaines. Music by Marin Marais. With Lee Santana (lute). DHM Sony BMG (2008)
- Kapsbergiana. Arrangements of the Libro Terzo of Kapsberger, as one of Los Otros. DHM Sony BMG 88697527152 (2009)
- Triosonaten BWV 525-530. Music by Johann Sebastian Bach: trio sonatas arranged for gamba and harpsichord. With Christine Schornsheim (harpsichord) and Lee Santana (lute). DHM Song BMG 88697526972 (2009)

=== 2010s ===
- Loves Alchymie. Music by Ferrabosco, Anonymous, Coperario, Donne, Corkine, Wilson, Jenkins, Laws, Hume, Dowland. (2010)
- The Age of Passions. Lute trios by Philippo Martino, probably published 1726-1730. With Lee Santana (lute), Karl Kaiser (flute), and Petra Müllejans (violin). DHM Sony 88697690282 (2010)
- Sound out my voice!. Italian madrigals and bastarda music for viol consort. As one of the ORLANDOviols. Lunaris CD Produktion Wienroth (30 September 2010)
- The Rosary Sonatas. Music by Biber. Daniel Sepec (violins), Perl (viola da gamba), Lee Santana (archlute, theorbe) & Michael Behringer (organ, harpsichord). Coviello 21008 (2010-11-22)
- Verleih uns Frieden gnädiglich. Music by Anonymous, Schelle, Schröter/Altenburg, Resinarius/Walter/Eccard, Schütz, Kindermann, Praetorius, Forster, Freundt, Schein, Scandelius, Cutting, Holborne. (2011)
- Concerti Telemann Pfeiffer Graun. Telemann: Concerto for recorder, gamba, and orchestra TWV 52:a1; Carl Friedrich Abel: Adagio and Allegro from MS Drexel 5871; Johann Pfeiffer: Concerto in A major for gamba, two violins, and b.c. [basso continuo]; Abel: Interludium in D from MS Drexel 5871; Johann Gottlieb Graun: Concerto in G major for gamba, strings, and b.c.; Abel: Arpeggiata and Fantasia from MS Drexel 5871. With Han Tol (alto recorder) and the Freiburger Barockorchester (Petra Müllejans, violin and direction). DHM Sony 88697824002 (2012)
- Music of Johann Schenk. Music by Johann Schenk: Le Nymphe di Rheno (1702)-Sonata IV-Chaconne, Echo du Danube (1704)-Sonata II, Scherzi Musicali (1698)-Suite in F, Le Nymphe di Rheno-Sonata XI, Tyd en konst Oeffeningen (1688)-Sonata IV, Scherzi Musicali (1698)-Suite in G. With Lee Santana (guitar, archlute, baroque lute, chitarrone), Marthe Perl (viola da gamba), Johannes Gontarski (chitarrone). DHM Sony 88691903812 (2012)
- Sixxes or "the American Gamba". Music by John Cage, Richard Cornell, Martha Bishop, Christian Wolff and Lee Santana. With Lee Santana (archlute), Nele Gramß (voice), Annette John (recorder), Frauke Hess (bass viol, violone), Marthe Perl (bass viol), Julia Vetö (treble viol), Claas Harders (bass viol). One unreleased piece from the recording sessions, composed by Jay Starker, was included in the first Carpe Diem Records podcast, May 2020. DHM 88725468022 (2012)
- Pariser Quartette, Nouveaux Quatuors. Music by Telemann: Paris Quartets 1-3 in D (TWV 43-D3), a (TWV 43-a2), G (TWV 43-G4). As one of the Age of Passions, with Karl Kaiser (flute), Petra Müllejans (violin), Lee Santana (lute), Juris Teichmanis (cello, quartet no. 1), and Michael Behringer (harpsichord, quartets nos. 2 and 3). DHM Sony 88697839642 (2013)
- Pariser Quartette, Nouveaux Quatuors. Music by Telemann: Paris Quartets 4-6 in b (TWV 43-h2), A (TWV 43-A3), and e (TWV 43-e4). Same performers as quartets 1-3 (preceding item). DHM Sony 88883717672 (2014)
- Sinfonie di viole: Liquide Perle. Music by Allegri, Trabaci, Ferro, and others. "Music for Sinfonie di viole displays all the vivacity of 17th century Italy: the dynamic, virtuoso and experimental compositions carry us off to a world full of energy and inspiration. These Italian works for viol consort are not so well-known, but once you start listening, you won't want to stop ..." (MP, back cover). As one of the Sirius Viols, with Frauke Hess, Juliane Laake, Julia Vetö, Sarah Perl, Marthe Perl (viole da gamba), and Lee Santana, Johannes Gontarski (lutes). DHM Sony 88765413072 (2013)
- Elements. Music by Marthe Perl, Francis Poulenc, and several baroque composers. With Marthe Perl (gamba and treble viol). "A musical journey through the four elements ..." (HP, back cover). DHM Sony 88843033682 (2014)
- Born to be Mild. Music from approximately the last seven centuries, including three compositions by Santana, played on amplified gambas (Perls) and guitar (Santana). With Marthe Perl and Lee Santana. DHM Sony BMG 88875061972 (2015)
- Christopher Simpson The Four Seasons. "Marthe is our spring-treble, while Frauke plays the summer and Hille represents the autumn and also winter ..." (players, CD booklet). As one of the Sirius Viols, with Frauke Hess (treble viol), Marthe Perl (treble viol), and Lee Santana (cittern, theorbo), Johannes Gontarski (bandora, guitar, cittern), and Andreas Küppers (positive organ). Recorded December 4–7, 2015, St. Onsdag in Mandelsloh. DHM Sony 88875190982 (2016)
- Händel. Music by Handel, including the cantata Tra le fiamme, Cantata spagnuola, and the cantata La biana rosa. With Dorothee Mields, soprano, Lee Santana (chitarra spagnuola and baroque lute), and La Folia Barockorchester. DHM Sony 88985405322 (2017)
- Johann Sebastian Bach, 6 Flute Sonatas. Music by Johann Sebastian Bach, BWV 1030-1035. Michala Petri (recorder), Hille Perl (viola da gamba), Mahan Esfahani (harpischord). OUR Recordings OE 6.22073 (2019)

=== 2020s ===
- Ballads Within a Dream. Songs by Henry Purcell, lute songs, solo improvisations for the theorbo, and virtuoso string music from the British Isles. Andreas Arend (concept, arranger, theorbo), Hille Perl (viola da gamba), Veronika Skuplik (violin), Clare Wilkinson (voice). DHM Sony 19075982082 (2020)
- Corellimania. Works by Corelli, Handel, J.S. Bach, and Telemann. Michala Petri (flute), Hille Perl (viola da gamba), Mahan Esfahani (harpsichord). OUR (2023-10-13)

=== Supporting ===
Perl was a member of The Harp Consort, directed by Andrew Lawrence-King, for a number of years; discography and other information are available there.

Perl has also played substantial parts on a number of other records for which she was not a principal, including the following.

==== 1990s (supporting) ====
- Leclair: Flute Sonatas. Music by Jean-Marie Leclair: Sonatas in e (op.2, no.1), G (op.9, no.7), C (op.2, no.3), e (op.9, no.2), and b (op.2, no.11). Christoph Huntgeburth (flute), Mitzi Meyerson (harpsichord). ASV CD GAU 158 (1996)
- Musik für Sans Souci (Music at Sans-Souci - The Court of Frederick II). Music by Johann Gottlieb Graun (Concerto grosso in G, Gambenkonzert in G), Johann Joachim Quantz (Flötenkonzert in e), and Franz Benda (Flötenkonzert in G). With Ensemble Sans-Souci Berlin and Christoph Huntgeburth (flute). KammerTon 22003 (1997), reissed 2024-11-29.
- Ruggiero Im Aufbruch: Musik Des Italienischen Frühbarock. Music by Paolo Quagliati, Girolamo Frescobaldi, and others. Movimento, Christoph Lehmann (organ, harpsichord), Nele Gramß (soprano), Perl (viola da gamba), Veronika Skuplik (violin).

==== 2000s (supporting) ====
- Jacob Klein, Six Sonaten für Violoncello op.4. Sonatas 5(a), 2(A), 4(E), 1(B), 3(G), 6(e). Kristin von der Goltz, cello; with Lee Santana, lute. Raumklang RK 06667 (2004)
- Dépaysements, Willy Merz. Music by Merz on the "artifice of temporalities", for voice and piano (Linda Campanella and Cristina Barbuti), and solo gamba (Perl), contrabassoon (Merz), percussion (Thierry Miroglio), bassoon (Diego Chenna), and viola (Danilo Rossi). Stradivarius STR 33699 (2005)
- Heinrich Ignaz Biber (1644-1704). Violin sonatas from the Kremsier archive: in c, D, E, g, B, and Ciacona in D; also Georg Muffat (1635-1704)'s Sonata in D. Anton Steck, violin; with Christian Rieger, harpsichord and organ, Lee Santana, archlute and chitarrone. cpo 777 124-2 (2005)
- Antoine Dard. 6 sonates pour le violoncelle avec la basse continue (1759). Kristin von der Goltz, cello, with Christine Schornsheim, harpsichord. Raumklang RK 2701 (2007)
- India: Arias, Madrigals and Laments. Music by Sigismondo d'India. Gudrun Anders (soprano), Sigrun Richter (arciliuto and chitarrone); Perl plays lirone as well as gamba. Christophorus CHE1342 (11 August 2008)
- Venezia 1625: Sonate, Symphonie, Ciaccone, Canzone, & Toccate. Music by G.B. Fontana, M. Uccelini, B. Storace, T. Merula, S. Rossi, D. Castello, A. Piccinini. Maurice Steger, recorder and direction, with Lee Santana (chitarrone), and others. Harmonia Mundi HMC 902024 (2009)
- Michaelisvesper. Music by Michael Praetorius. Knabenchor Hannover, Jörg Breiding, director. With Hille Perl & the Sirius Viols. Rondeau (2009-01-04)

==== 2010s (supporting) ====
- Telemann: Spirituosa. Music by Telemann: Quintet in D (TWV 44:1), sonata in A (TWV 42:A10), sonata in a (TWV42:a5), trio sonatas in G (TWV 42:G7), b (TWV 42:h5), and D (TWV 42:D11), sonate in A (TWV44:35), sonata in A (TWV 40:200), sonata in e (TWV 42:e12). Concerto Melante, with Reinhold Friedrich (trumpet) on the first piece and Perl (gamba) on the second. DHM 88697626632 (2010-08-23)
- De Profundis. Music by Orazio Benevoli, Michel Godard, Lee Santana, and others. Paul Willenbrock (bass), Michel Godard (serpent), Alain Buet (bass), Philippe Roche (bass), Perl (viol), Lee Santana (chitarrone). Carpe Diem CD16274 (2010-08-24)
- Italian Madrigals. Music by Heinrich Schütz. Dresdner Kammerchor, Hans-Christoph Rademann, director. With Dorothee Mields, Perl (reportedly playing lute), Sirius Viols, and others. Carus 83.237 (2011-05-16)
- Knabenchor Hannover (Hanover Boys' Choir). Jörg Breiding, director of music. Music by Monteverdi, Praetorius, Schütz, Hammerschmidt, Buxtehude, Vivaldi, Bach, Mendelssohn, Koerppen, Strohbach, Weiss, Rutter. With the Sirius Viols, Bremer Lautten Chor, Himlische Cantorey, Concerto Palatino, Johann Rosenmüller Ensemble, Musica Alta Ripa, Barockensemble L'Arco, Kammersymphonie Hannover, NDR Radiophilharmonie, Nürnberger Symphoniker. Rondeau Production ROP 7014 (2012)
- Brandenburgische Konzerte (Brandenburg Concertos). Music by J.S. Bach. Hofkapelle München with Rüdiger Lotter (violin, direction), Dorothee Oberlinger (flute) and Hille and Marthe Perl (gambas). DHM 88765477882 (2013-11-01)
- Auferstehungshistorie SWV 50 (Carus Schütz-Edition Vol. 9). Music by Heinrich Schütz. Dresdner Kammerchor, Christoph Rademann, director. With Georg Poplutz, Hille Perl, Lee Santana, and others. Carus 83.256 (2014-07-03)
- Lukaspassion & Die Sieben Worte. Music by Heinrich Schütz. Dresdner Kammerchor, Christoph Rademann, director. With Ulrike Hofbauer, Hille Perl, Lee Santana, and others. Carus 83.253 (2013)
- Johannes-Passion BWV 245. Music by J.S. Bach. Stuttgart Hymnus Choir Boys and Handel's Company, Rainer Johannes Homburg, director. With Veronika Winter, Franz Vitzthum, Andreas Post, Hille Perl, and others. MDG (2017-01-15)
- Die Gesamteinspielung Box 1 (Carus Schütz-Edition). Music by Heinrich Schütz. Dresdner Kammerchor, Christoph Rademann, director. With Dorothee Mields, Sarah Perl, Hille Perl, Lee Santana, and others. Carus 83.041, 11 CDs (2016-10-07)
- Die Gesamteinspielung Box 2 (Carus Schütz-Edition). Music by Heinrich Schütz. Dresdner Kammerchor, Christoph Rademann, director. With Dorothee Mields, Sarah Perl, Hille Perl, Lee Santana, and others. Carus 83.042, 8 CDs (2017-08-20)
- Secret History. Music by Josquin Desprez and Tomás Luis de Victoria. John Potter (vocals), Anna Maria Friman (vocals), Ariel Abramovich (vihuela), Jacob Heringman (vihuela), Lee Santana (vihuela), Perl (viola da gamba). ECM 4811463 (2017-08-25)
- St Matthew Passion. Music by J.S. Bach. Bachchor Mainz, Bachorchester Mainz, Ralf Otto, director. With Christian Rathgeber (tenor), Perl (viola da gamba), Sabine Bauer (harpsichord), and others. Naxos 8574036-38 (2019-03-08)

==== 2020s (supporting) ====
- The Complete Vocal Works. Music by Jan Pieterszoon Sweelinck. Gesualdo Consort Amsterdam, Harry van der Kamp, conductor. Lee Santana (lute), Bernard Winsemius (organ), Perl (viola da gamba), and others. Originally released 2009-2012; released by note 1 music (17 CDs), 8 424562 224117 (2021)
- Cantiones Sacrae. Music by Heinrich Schütz. Dresdner Kammerchor, Hans-Christoph Rademann, director. With Frauke Hess (violin), Perl (viola da gamba), Lee Santana (theorbo), and others. Carus 5093252 (2021-08-20)
- Geistliche Chor-Music . Music by Heinrich Schütz. Dresdner Kammerchor, Cappella Saggittariana, Hans-Christoph Rademann, director. With Frauke Hess (violin), Ludger Rémy (organ), Perl (viola da gamba), and others. Carus 5093232 (2021-08-20)
- A Day with Suzanne (A Tribute to Leonard Cohen), Joel Frederiksen and Ensemble Phoenix Munich. Covers of several Leonard Cohen songs, sung by Frederiksen, who also plays lute, interspersed with both vocal and instrumental pieces from other centuries, including "Susanne un jour" by Orlando di Lasso and "Adieu mes amours" by Josquin des Prez. Emma-Lisa Roux, voice and lute; Perl, viola da gamba; Domen Marincic, gamba and virginal. DHM 19658725022 (2021)
- Delicacy, Nadine Henrichs. Original works and arrangements for viola from the 18th century. Music by Telemann, Braun, J.S. Bach, and others. Henrichs, viola and arranger, with Péter Barczi (violin), Perl (viola da gamba), Michael Behringer (harpsichord), Annekatrin Beller (violoncello). Carpe Diem CD-16328 (2022)
- Sonaten für Cello & Bc op.5 Nr.1-6. Music by Francesco Geminiani. Kristin von der Goltz, baroque cello. Perl, viola da gamba; Andreas Küppers, harpsichord; Christoph Dangel, baroque cello; Thomas Boysen, lute and theorbo. cpo 555402-2 (2023)
- Der hellen Nacht (Advent music of the German baroque period). Music by H. Albert, Bernhard, Eccard, Schütz, Buxtehude, Böddecker, Kriger, J.S. Bach, and Hammerschmidt. Movimento, Christoph Lehmann, Perl (viola da gamba). Kammer Ton KT2002 (2024-11-29)
- Pandolfi Mealli Sonatas for violin & continuo, Giovanni Antonio Pandolfi [Mealli]. Daniel Sepec (violin), Perl (viola da gamba), Lee Santana (lute), Michael Behringer (harpsichord). Coviello COV92421 (2025-01-31)

== ORLANDOviols ==
Starting in 2020, the ORLANDOviols viola da gamba ensemble, of which Perl is a member, began giving online concerts. The players are physically separated, but using the ovbox device and software, can still play and perform together.

Several individual pieces are also available, including three composed by Lee Santana, and one by John Cage.

The ORLANDOviols ensemble: Hille Perl, Frauke Hess, Júlia Vető, Martha Perl, Claas Harders, and Giso Grimm.
