= Juan Gutiérrez de Padilla =

Mexican composer (c1590-1664)

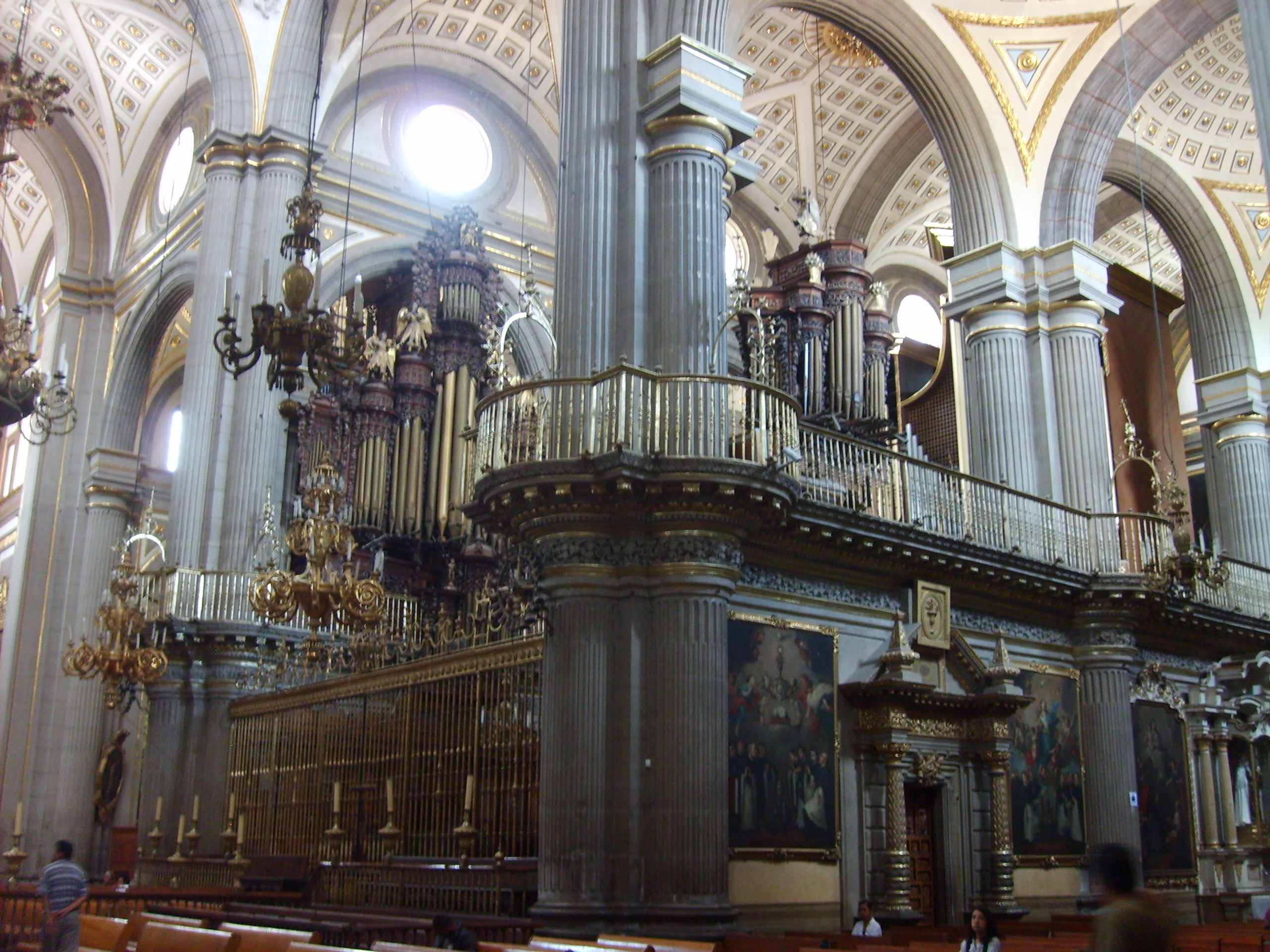
The Choir of the Cathedral of Puebla where Gutierrez de Padilla would work the last 42 years of his life.

Juan Gutiérrez de Padilla (ca. 1590 – 1664) was a Renaissance-style Spanish composer and cantor, most of whose career took place in Mexico.

== Life and career ==
Juan Gutiérrez de Padilla was born in Málaga, Spain. He received his musical education from Francisco Vásquez, who was the maestro de capilla of Málaga Cathedral. Padilla took up the position of maestro at the collegiate church in Jerez de la Frontera in 1612. While at Jerez, he unsuccessfully contended for the office of maestro at Málaga Cathedral in 1613, losing out to Estêvão de Brito. Padilla remained at Jerez until 1616, when he was appointed Maestro at Cádiz Cathedral.

Padilla moved to Puebla, Mexico, between 1620 and 1622. At the time New Spain was a viceroyalty of Spain that included modern day Mexico, Guatemala, the Philippines and other parts of Central America and the Caribbean. Padilla is one of the more important composers represented in the manuscripts at Puebla, Mexico and the Hackenberry collection in Chicago, Illinois. He worked at Puebla de Los Angeles, Mexico, which in the 17th century was a bigger religious center than Mexico City itself. Padilla was hired as a cantor and assistant professor at Puebla Cathedral under the maestro de capilla Gaspar Fernandes. After Fernandes' death, he was appointed maestro of the cathedral in 1629. By 1645, Padilla was overseeing 14 choir boys and 28 cantors. Some of the musicians under Padilla would themselves go on to become important figures in the music of New Spain, such as Francisco López Capillas. The Mexican composer Juan García de Zéspedes was a boy soprano in the cathedral choir under Padilla, and later succeeded him to the office of maestro in 1664.

He is to be distinguished from a younger Juan de Padilla, who was maestro de capilla at Zamora, Spain (1661–1663), and Toledo (1663–1673).

== Works ==
The majority of his vast output (over 700 pieces survive) include sacred motets, often for double choir, in the Renaissance style or stile antico as well as sacred villancicos. It often includes accompaniments for organ or various stringed instruments.

== Bibliography ==
Padilla's music is rather difficult to get hold of: Mapa Mundi, publish singing scores of some of this music including the double choir piece Deus in Adiutorium Meum Intende. Alfredston Music can provide instrumental parts for the smaller pieces in their collection.

There are at least 2 Ph.D. theses with Padilla's music in the appendices: S. Barwick, Sacred Vocal Polyphony in Early Colonial Mexico, (diss., Harvard Univ., 1949), includes the 2nd St. Matthew Passion; and A. Ray / A. R. Catalyne, The Double-choir Music of Juan de Padilla, (diss., Univ. of Southern California, 1953).

== Recordings ==
- Missa Ego Flos Campi; Stabat Mater on Victoria and the Music of Imperial Spain Mixolydian dir. Piers Schmidt. Carlton Classics 30366 00802 1989
- Mirabilia testimonium; Lamentation for Maundy Thursday; Salve Regina on Masterpieces of Mexican Polyphony Westminster Cathedral Choir dir. James O'Donnell. Hyperion CDA66330 1989
- Missa Ego Flos Campi, along with a number of secular works on Missa Mexicana The Harp Consort dir. Andrew Lawrence-King. Harmonia Mundi HMX 2907293 2003
- Missa Ave Regina and motets. Streams of Tears The Sixteen dir. Harry Christophers. CORO COR16059 2008
- Lamentation for Maundy Thursday on Lamentations of Jeremiah The Tallis Scholars dir. Peter Phillips. Gimell CDGIM 043 2010

Benjamín Juárez Echenique has recorded a Mass and two sets of Christmas villancicos for Urtext digital classics:

- Padilla; Maitines de Natividad 1652 (Mexican Baroque, Vol. 7) Angelicum de Puebla, dir. Echenique Urtext UMA2011 46'07"
- Padilla; Maitines de Natividad 1653 (Baroque Mexico, Vol. 1) Angelicum de Puebla, dir. Echenique Urtext UMA2004
- Padilla; Missa Ego flos campi (excerpts) 1653 (Baroque Mexico, Vol. 3) Angelicum de Puebla, dir. Echenique Urtext UMA2005 1996
