= The Harp Consort =

Early music ensemble

The Harp Consort is an international early music ensemble directed by Andrew Lawrence-King, specialising in Baroque opera, early dance-music, and historical World Music.

The Harp Consort improvises within the distinct baroque, renaissance, and medieval music styles. The group takes its inspiration from the 17th-century harp consort formed in England at the court of Charles I: in contrast to the homogeneous string orchestra (also formed at this time), the Consorte brought together diverse types of solo instruments – harp, lutes, keyboards, strings – and voices, to create colourful new combinations in the fashion of the day. Like the 17th-century Consorte, the Harp Consort is formed around the accompanying instruments of the basso continuo. It brings together an international team of musicians who create a rich variety of timbres.

== CDs and awards ==
The Harp Consort's debut CD, Luz y Norte (17th-century dance-music from Spain and South America, mainly from a collection by Ruiz de Ribayaz) gained a Diapason d’Or in France, Record of the Year from Amadeus magazine in Italy, and topped the classical charts for five weeks in Australia.

The ensemble's recordings on DHM include 'Carolan's Harp’; ‘Italian Concerto’ [Best Early Music CD, German Phonographic Academy]; the medieval ‘Ludus Danielis’; and La púrpura de la rosa [Noah Greenberg Award], the first New World opera, given in Lima, Peru in 1701. The ensemble has also recorded Lawes for Berlin Classics and Purcell for Astrée Auvidis, and formed the continuo band for Andrew Lawrence-King's recording of Handel's ‘Almira’ [American Handel Society CD of the year], for Vivaldi's ‘Four Seasons’ with the Freiburg Baroque Orchestra and for ‘Fire-Water’: Spanish renaissance ensaladas with The King's Singers.

The Harp Consort now records exclusively for Harmonia Mundi USA. Their first release was Missa Mexicana: festive polyphony and popular dances from 17th-century Mexico (The Times (London) CD of the Year). Their second CD, Miracles of Notre Dame (songs arranged by Gautier de Coincy, 13th-century Prior of Vic) won the Dutch "Edison" award: it was also Gramophone Magazine's Editor's Choice & London Telegraph CD of the Year.

== Discography ==
- Luz y Norte: Baroque Dance-music from Spain, Italy, South America and Africa. Music by Lucas Ruiz de Ribayaz, Madrid 1677. BMG DHM 05472 77810 2 (1995)
- Carolan's Harp. Music by Turlough O'Carolan. Andrew Lawrence-King (Irish harps, renaissance harp, French cittern, psaltery), with Caitríona O'Leary (voice, hurdy-gurdy), Nigel Rogers (tenor), with Steve Player as The Frenchman & the Jovial Crew; David Douglass (violin), Nancy Hadden (flute, recorder, gittern), Belinda Sykes (alto shawm, Renaissance bagpipes), Hille Perl (viola da gamba, lyra viol, violone, gittern); Lucy Carolan (harpsichord), Pat O'Brien (bandora, guitar), Paul O'Dette (theorbo, cittern, guitar), Steve Player (dancer, gittern, French cittern, guitar, whistle, drone pipes), Pedro Estevan (percussion). BMG 05472-77375-2 (1996).
- Italian Concerto: The Italian "gusto" at home and abroad. Music by Vivaldi, Turlough O'Carolan, J.S. Bach, Handel. Andrew Lawrence-King (Italian arpa doppia). With Hille Perl (lira, violone), Paul O'Dette (theorbo), and many other performers. BMG DHM 05472-77366-2 (1997).
- Ludus Danielis
- La púrpura de la rosa
- Spanish Gypsies: Celtic and Spanish music in Shakespeare's England. Music by John Playford, Tobias Hume, Giles Farnaby, and others. Hille Perl (viola da gamba, lira viol, baroque guitar), Rachel Podger (baroque violin), Nancy Hadden (renaissance flute), Keith McGowan (shawm); and Steve Player (baroque guitar, gittern, bagpipes), Lee Santana (cittern, theorbo, baroque guitar), Michael Metzler (percussion), directed by Andrew Lawrence-King (harp, triple harp, Irish harp, Spanish harp, psaltery). BMG Ariola Classics DHM 05472 77516 2 (1999).
- Missa Mexicana. Harmonia Mundi HMX 2907923 (2002).
- Vivaldi: The Four Seasons - Freiburger Barockorchester
- Fire-Water: Spanish renaissance ensaladas - The King's Singers
- Miracles of Notre Dame
- El Arte de Fantasía: Spanish romances and French chansons from the libre de cifra nueva para tecla, arpa & vihuela, transcribed by Luis Venegas de Henestrosa (1557). Music by Cabezón, Mudarra, Josquin, Narváez, Crequillon, et al. Andrew Lawrence-King (Spanish double-harp, renaissance harp, organ, harpsichord, psaltery), with Hille Perl (viola da gamba), Lee Santana (vihuela, cittern), Steve Player (renaissance guitar, percussion), Helen Coombs (organ, harpsichord). Harmonia Mundi USA HMU 907316 (2004).
- Les travailleurs de la mer: Ancient songs from a small island. Music of Guernsey, after the novel by Victor Hugo. Directed by Andrew Lawrence-King (triple harp, medieval harp, psaltery, chifournie), with Clara Sanabras (soprano, baroque guitar) and Paul Hillier (baritone); and Jane Achtman (viola da gamba, fiddle), Nancy Hadden (flutes, baroque guitar), Ian Harrison (bagpipes, shawn, cornetto), Steven Player (baroque guitars, percussion), Richardo Padilla (percussion), Helen Coombs (chifournier). HMU 907330 (2004).
