= Lee Santana =

American musician and composer

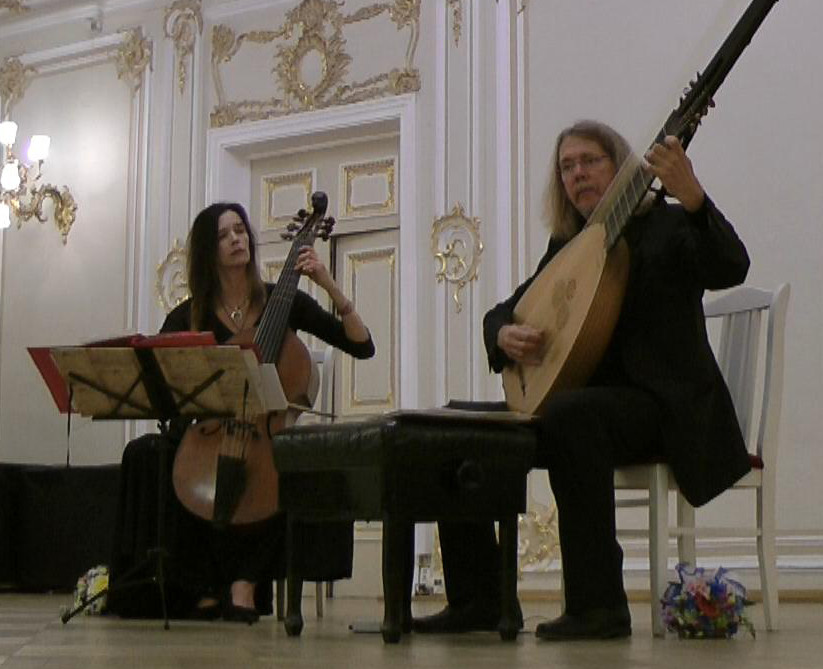
Hille Pearl and Lee Santana at a concert in the Small Hall of the St. Petersburg Philharmonic. 10.25.2014..jpg

Lee Santana (born 1959) is an American lutenist and composer, resident in Bremen, Germany.

Lee Santana studied with Stephen Stubbs.

He has composed a variety of works for early instruments such as lutes, viols, recorders and small baroque orchestra. He performs with the Freiburg Baroque Orchestra, the gambist Hille Perl and in the group Los Otros, among others. He has made many recordings with Perl and solo (below), as well as Concerts à deux violes esgales by Monsieur de Sainte-Colombe with Hille Perl, Lorenz Duftschmid, and Andrew Lawrence-King.

== Family ==
He is married to the viola da gamba player Hille Perl.

== Solo and Composer Discography ==
- The Star and the Sea (Carpe Diem) 2002 - music by Santana. Discussed in depth on the second Carpe Diem podcast, July 2020, with Jonas Niederstadt, on the occasion of the remastered release of the record.
- Cradle of Conceites (Carpe Diem 16272) 2008 - music by Anthony Holborne. This was the first release on Carpe Diem Records under the direction of Jonas Niederstadt. All aspect of the recording, both technical and musical, are discussed by Niederstadt in the first Carpe Diem podcast, May 2020.
- Pentagram (Sony 88697851082) 2011 - music by Santana, Nicolas Vallet, and Johann Sebastian Bach.
- Doulandia (Sony 88883772072) 2013 - music by and around John Dowland.
- Music from the Acoustic Neighborhood [Dónde son estas serranas] (Carpe Diem 16319) 2018 - with Antje Rux, soprano; Andreas Wahl, electric guitar and e-bow; Marthe Perl, viola da gamba. Music by Wahl, Santana, Perl, and Enriquez de Valderrábano, Francisco Salinas, Diego Ortiz, Juan Vasquez.
