= Tigrane (Vivaldi) =

Opera by Antonio Vivaldi, Benedetto Micheli and Nicola Romaldi

La Virtù trionfante dell'amore e dell'odio overo Il Tigrane (RV 740) is a 1724 opera for the carnival season in Rome. It was a joint composition by Benedetto Micheli (Act I), Vivaldi (Act II) and Nicola Romaldi (Act III). The libretto was originally thought to based on that by Francesco Silvani already used in Venice in 1691, but has been identified as a libretto by Pietro Andrea Bernardoni used in Vienna in 1710.

== Recordings ==
- Complete Act II - Mónika González (soprano), Ildikó Szakács (soprano), Artur Stefanowicz (countertenor), Barnabás Heygi (countertenor), Timothy Bentch (tenor), Zsolt Molnár (baritone) & László Jekl (bass) Savaria Baroque Orchestra Pál Németh Hungaroton
- "Squarciami pure il seno" (Cleopatra) - by Simone Kermes on Amor Profano; also Regula Mühlemann on Cleopatra, La Folia Barockorchester, Robin Peter Müller 2017
- "Fara la mia spada" (Oronte) - Philippe Jaroussky, Heroes Jean-Christophe Spinosi
- "Care pupille" Topi Lehtipuu on Arie per tenore Diego Fasolis Naive Vivaldi Edition; also by Nicholas Scott Un jardin à l'italienne Les Arts Florissants

== See also ==
- Tigrane (Hasse)
