= Venus and Adonis (opera) =

Opera by John Blow written c1682

- Opera by John Blow
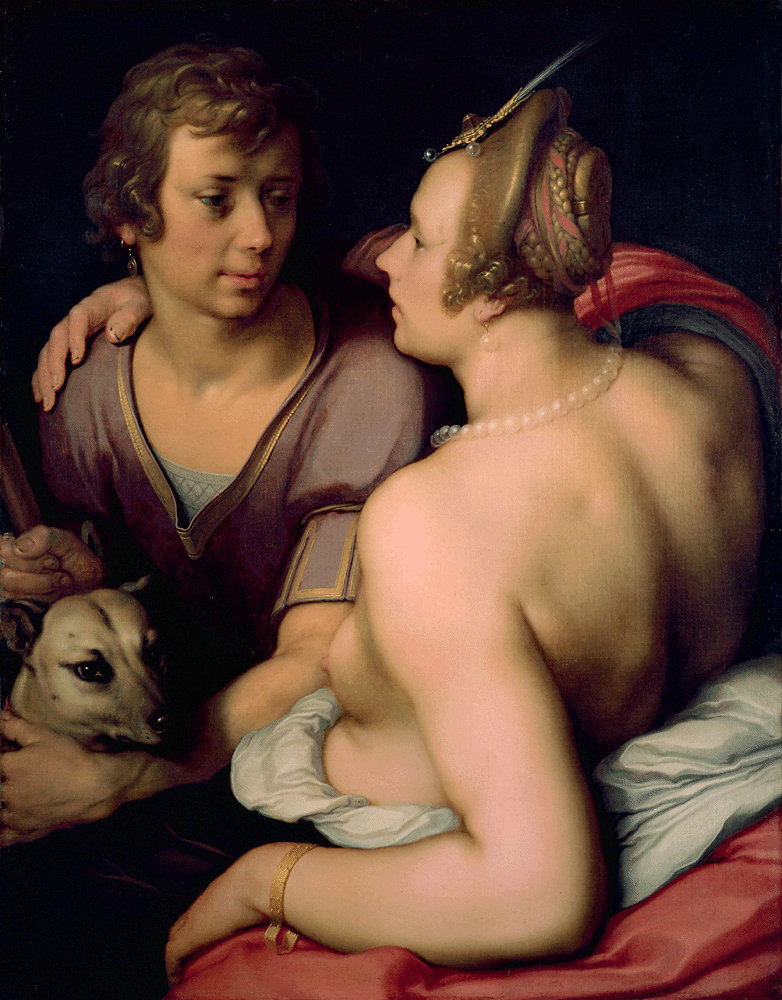
- Cornelis van Haarlem: Venus and Adonis (1614)
- Librettist: Aphra Behn or Anne Kingsmill
- Based on: Venus and Adonis

Venus and Adonis is an opera in three acts and a prologue by the English Baroque composer John Blow, composed no later than 1684 (when we know it was revived) and no earlier than 1681 (when its text was completed). It was written for the court of King Charles II at either London or Windsor Castle. It is considered by some to be either a semi-opera or a masque, but The New Grove names it as the earliest known English opera.

The author of the libretto was surmised to have been Aphra Behn due to the feminist nature of the text, and that she later worked with Blow on the play The Luckey Chance. Alternatively, the librettist may have been Anne Kingsmill, subsequently married as Anne Finch, possibly in collaboration with the poet Anne Killigrew. The story is based on the Classical myth of Venus and Adonis, which was also the basis for Shakespeare's poem Venus and Adonis, as well as Ovid's poem of the same name in his Metamorphoses.

== Roles ==
Roles, voice types, premiere cast
Role	Voice type	Premiere cast
Cupid	soprano	
Venus	soprano	Mary (Moll) Davis
Adonis	baritone	
Shepherd	contralto or countertenor	
Shepherdess	soprano	
Huntsman	contralto or countertenor	
Cupids, shepherds and shepherdesses, huntsmen, and courtiers (chorus)

== Music ==
Venus and Adonis is considered by some to be either a semi-opera or a masque, but The New Grove names it as the earliest surviving English opera. In fact, an early manuscript source is subtitled "A masque for the entertainment of the king".

In overall form the opera owes much to French operas of the period, especially those of Jean-Baptiste Lully. The French elements in the opera are the French overture, the prologue which refers in scarcely veiled terms to the court for which it was written, and also includes many dances popular at the time. The piece is a clear model for Henry Purcell's opera Dido and Aeneas, both in structure and the use of the chorus. The piece is remarkable for the period because of its through-composed nature; there are no clear arias or set pieces, but the music continues throughout, using recitative to further the plot.

== Libretto ==
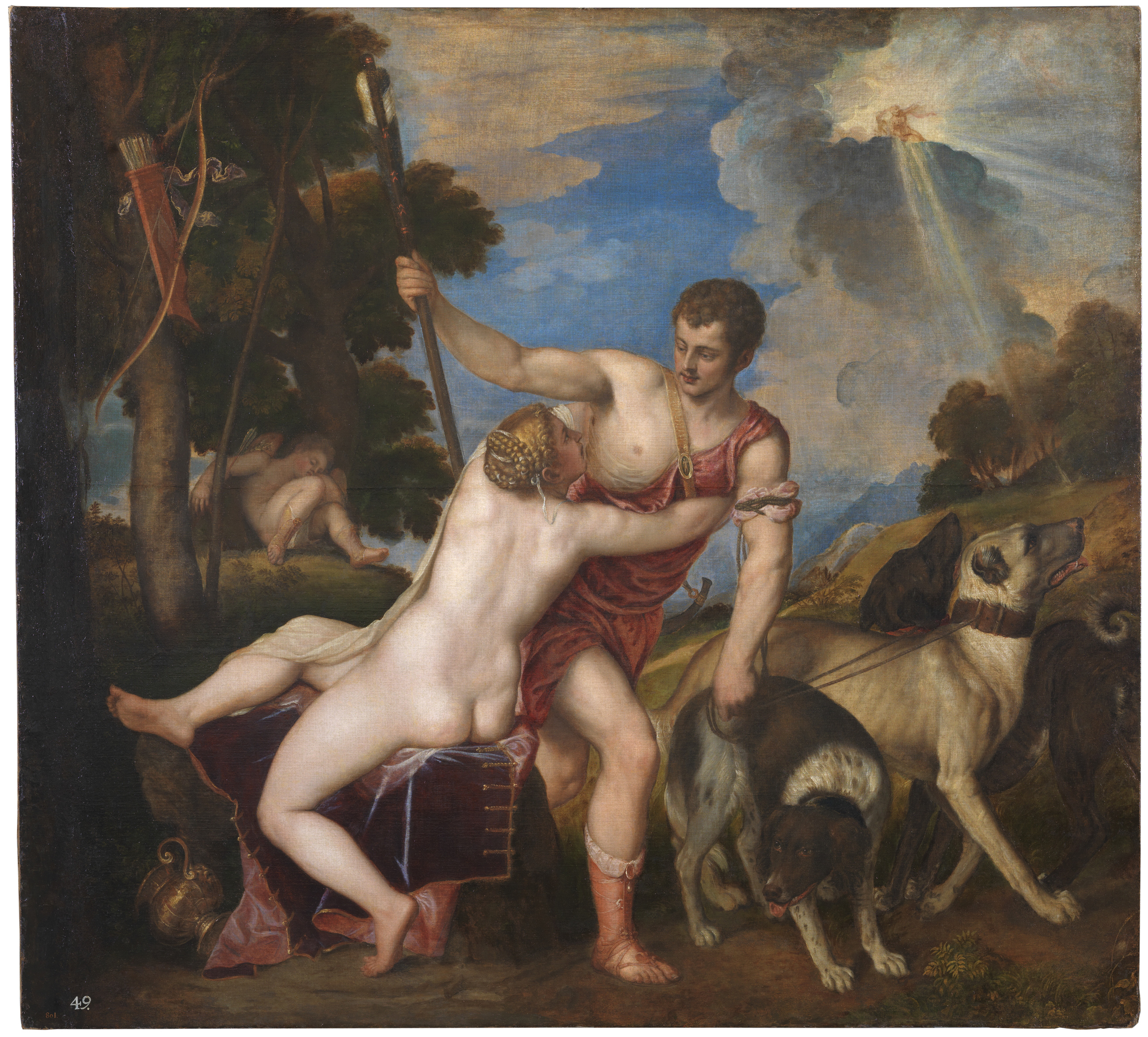
The same subject by Titian (1554)

The traditional myth of Venus and Adonis runs as follows:

Venus is with her son Cupid, and he accidentally pierces her with one of his arrows. The next person Venus sees is the handsome youth Adonis, with whom she immediately falls in love. He is a hunter, and she decides that in order to be with him, she will take on the form of the goddess of the hunt, Artemis. Eventually she warns Adonis of the danger of hunting the wild boar, but he does not heed the warning, and is gored to death by the boar.

In Blow's version, Venus encourages Adonis to go hunting, despite his protestations:

Adonis:
Adonis will not hunt today:
I have already caught the noblest prey.
Venus:
No, my shepherd haste away:
Absence kindles new desire,
I would not have my lover tire.

This parallels the scene in Purcell's later Dido and Aeneas (1688), when Dido rebuffs Aeneas' offer to stay with her. In addition to this major divergence from the myth in Adonis' motivation, Blow's version also includes the addition of a number of comic scenes with Cupid, including the spelling lesson he gives to the young cupids and his opinion that almost no one in the court is faithful—the latter an especially pungent critique given that it is believed that Cupid was played by Lady Mary Tudor, then around 10 years old and Charles II's illegitimate daughter, and Venus by Mary (Moll) Davis, the king's former lover.

== Synopsis ==
=== Prologue ===
After a French overture, Cupid addresses assorted shepherds and shepherdesses, accusing them of infidelity, and invites them to enjoy true pastoral pleasures.

=== Act 1 ===
The couple are resting on a couch, and Venus, accompanied by obbligato recorder, is toying with Adonis's sexual anticipation. Just before she gives in, hunting music is heard, and she encourages him to leave her and join the chase. The huntsmen intrude and sing of an enormous boar that is causing severe problems; thus goaded, Adonis leaves.

=== Act 2 ===
Cupid is studying the art of love, learning from his mother how to strike love into human hearts. He in turn teaches this lesson to a group of little Cupids. Cupid advises his mother that the way to make Adonis love her more is to "use him very ill". They then call the Graces, the givers of beauty and charm, to give honour to the goddess of love.

=== Act 3 ===
Venus and Cupid are shown struck by grief. Adonis is brought in, dying from the wound given to him by the boar. He duets with Venus, and dies in her arms. As a lament she begins a funeral march, and the refrain is taken up by the pastoral characters (in reality, Venus' courtiers). The opera ends with the G minor chorus "Mourn for thy servant", a strong example of elegiac counterpoint.

== Recordings ==
- 1951 – Margaret Ritchie (Venus), Gordon Clinton (Adonis), Margaret Field-Hyde (Cupid) – Ensemble Orchestral de L'Oiseau-Lyre, Anthony Lewis (L'Oiseau-Lyre)
- 1988 – Lynne Dawson (Venus), Stephen Varcoe (Adonis), Nancy Argenta (Cupid) – London Baroque, Charles Medlam (Harmonia Mundi)
- 1994 – Catherine Bott (Venus), Michael George (Adonis), Libby Crabtree (Cupid) – New London Consort, Philip Pickett (L'Oiseau-Lyre)
- 1999 – Rosemary Joshua (Venus), Gerald Finley (Adonis), Robin Blaze (Cupid) – Orchestra of the Age of Enlightenment, René Jacobs (Harmonia Mundi)
- 2009 – Amanda Forsythe (Venus), Tyler Duncan (Adonis), Mireille Lebel (Cupid) – Boston Early Music Festival Orchestra, Paul O'Dette (cpo)
- 2022 – The Cambridge Chamber Ensemble on YouTube
