= Juan de Céspedes =

Juan (de) Céspedes may refer to:

- Juan de Céspedes Ruiz (born c. 1501–1573), Spanish conquistador

== See also ==
- Juan Cespedes Uribe (born 1979), Dominican baseball player
- Juan García de Zéspedes (c. 1619–1678), Mexican musician
