= Missa Mexicana =

Studio album by The Harp Consort
- Released: October 8, 2013
- Genre: Classical
- Length: 60:09
- Label: Harmonia Mundi

Missa Mexicana is a studio album by international Early Music ensemble The Harp Consort. It was released in October 2002 under Harmonia Mundi, HMX 2907293. It juxtaposes a mass setting by Juan Gutiérrez de Padilla with Latin American and African folk dances that inspired it.

== Track listing ==
No.	Title	Length
1.	"O Villancico: Canten dos jilguerillos"	2:26
2.	"O Missa Ego Flos Campi: Kyrie"	2:10
3.	"O Jácaras de la costa"	4:17
4.	"O Xácara: Los que fueren de buen gusto"	4:54
5.	"O Missa Ego Flos Campi: Gloria"	3:25
6.	"O Corrente Italiana"	4:03
7.	"Xácara: A la xácara xacarilla"	7:11
8.	"Missa Ego Flos Campi: Credo"	5:56
9.	"Cumbées"	3:02
10.	"Negrilla: A siolo flasiquiyo"	5:11
11.	"O Missa Ego Flos Campi: Sanctus"	1:35
12.	"Marizápalos a lo humano: Marizápalos bajó una tarde"	6:40
13.	"Marizápalos a lo divino: Serafin que con dulce harmonía"	7:52
14.	"Diferencias sobre marizápalos"	4:20
15.	"Missa Ego Flos Campi: Agnus Dei"	1:37
16.	"Guaracha: Convidando está la noche"	4:25
