= Boston Early Music Festival =

- Genre: Early music
- Locations: Boston, Massachusetts, United States
- Years active: 1981–present
- Website: bemf.org

The Boston Early Music Festival (BEMF) is a non-profit organization founded in 1980 in Boston, Massachusetts, to promote historical music performance. It arranges an annual Boston and New York City concert series, produces opera recordings, and organizes a biennial week-long Festival and Exhibition in Boston.

== History ==
One of BEMF's goals is to bring attention to lesser-known Baroque operas, which are performed with period singing, orchestral performance, costuming, dance and staging. The centerpiece of the biennial festivals is a fully staged Baroque opera production. BEMF operas are led by Artistic Directors Paul O'Dette and Stephen Stubbs, Orchestra Director Robert Mealy, and Opera Director Gilbert Blin.

During each Festival, concerts are presented daily from morning until late at night. They are performed by an array of musicians, ranging from the established to the emerging, and allow for unique collaborations and programs by performers assembled for the Festival week. Scheduled "Fringe" concerts and events are presented by local and out-of-town groups at venues in Boston and Cambridge.

BEMF's annual season has featured such musicians as The Tallis Scholars, Jordi Savall and Hespèrion XXI, and Les Arts Florissants, as well as the North American débuts of Stile Antico, Bach Collegium Japan, Netherlands Bach Society, and Akademie für Alte Musik Berlin.

The BEMF promotes the 'Exhibition at the Festival' as the largest event of its kind in the United States. The exhibition showcases over 100 early instrument makers, music publishers, service organizations, schools and universities, and associated colleagues.

In 1989, BEMF established an annual concert series to meet demand for year-round performances of early music. This was expanded in 2006 with performances at The Morgan Library & Museum in New York City.

In 2004, a project was initiated to record some of BEMF's work in the field of Baroque opera on the CPO recording label. The series earned five Grammy Award nominations, including a 2015 Grammy Award for Best Opera Recording.

In 2008, BEMF introduced a Chamber Opera Series as part of its annual concert season. The series presents semi-staged productions of chamber operas composed during the Baroque period. In 2011, BEMF took its chamber production of Handel's Acis and Galatea on a four-city North American tour.

In 2026, BEMF won a second Grammy Award, Best Classical Solo Vocal Album, for its recording of Georg Philipp Telemann’s cantata Ino and opera arias for soprano.

== Operas staged ==
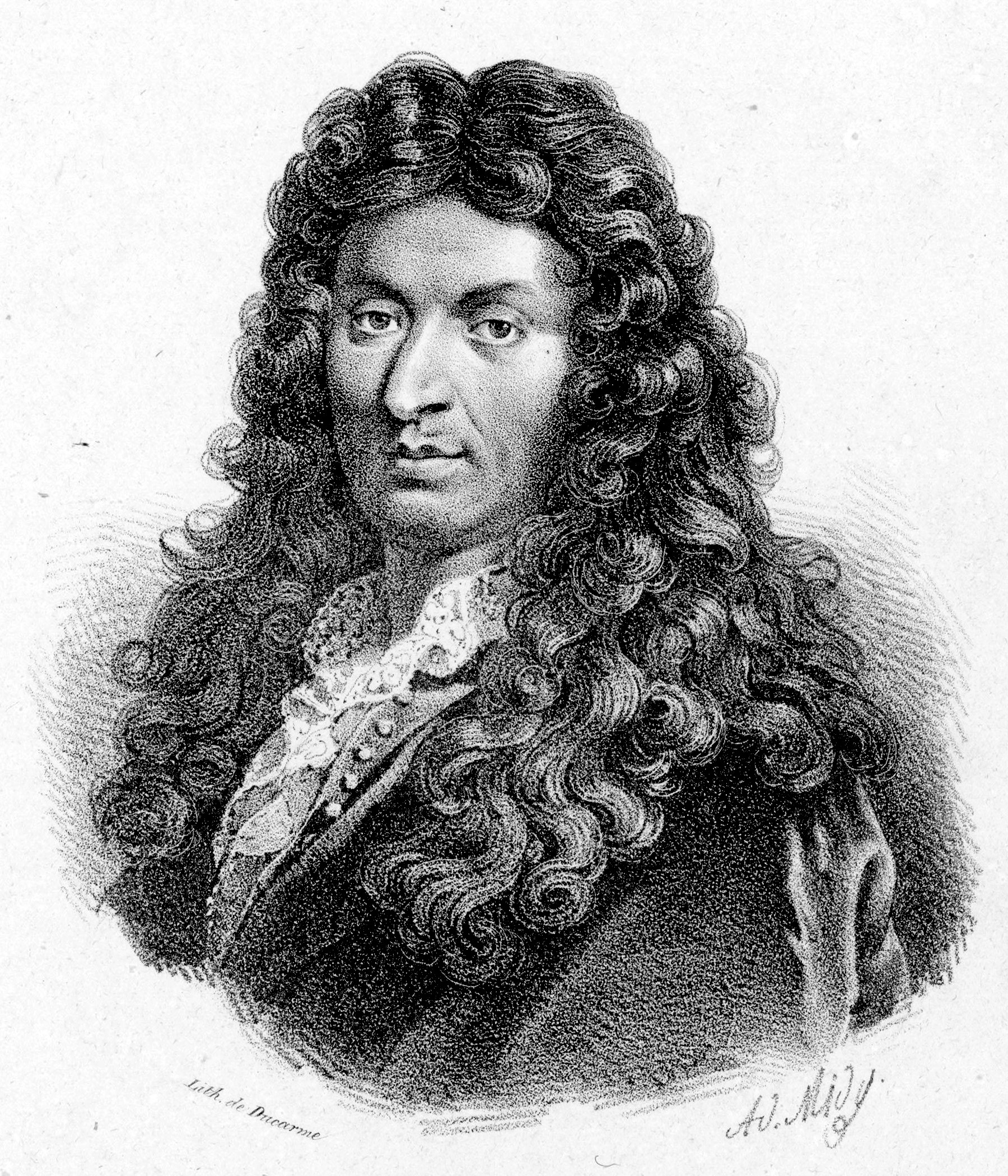
BEMF presented operas by Lully in 2001 and 2007

- King Arthur by Henry Purcell (1995)
- L’Orfeo by Luigi Rossi (1997)
- Ercole Amante by Francesco Cavalli (1999)
- Thésée by Jean-Baptiste Lully (2001)
- Ariadne by Johann Georg Conradi (2003)
- Boris Goudenow by Johann Mattheson (2005)
- Psyché by Jean-Baptiste Lully (2007)
- Venus and Adonis by John Blow (2008)
- Actéon by Marc-Antoine Charpentier (2008)
- L'incoronazione di Poppea by Claudio Monteverdi (2009)
- Acis and Galatea by George Frideric Handel (2009)
- Dido and Aeneas by Henry Purcell (2010)
- Niobe, regina di Tebe by Agostino Steffani (2011)
- La descente d'Orphée aux enfers by Marc-Antoine Charpentier (2011)
- La couronne de fleurs by Marc-Antoine Charpentier (2011)
- L'Orfeo by Claudio Monteverdi (2012)
- Almira by George Frideric Handel (2013)
- La serva padrona by Giovanni Battista Pergolesi (2014)
- Livietta e Tracollo by Giovanni Battista Pergolesi (2014)
- Il ritorno d'Ulisse in patria by Claudio Monteverdi (2015)
- Les plaisirs de Versailles by Marc-Antoine Charpentier (2016)
- Les fontaines de Versailles by Michel Richard Delalande (2016)
- Le carnaval de Venise by Andre Campra (2017)
- La liberazione di Ruggiero by Francesca Caccini (2018)
- Orlando generoso by Agostino Steffani (2019)
- Pimpinone by Georg Philipp Telemann (2021)
- Idylle sur la Paix by Jean-Baptiste Lully (2022)
- La Fête de Rueil by Marc-Antoine Charpentier (2022)
- Circé by Henri Desmarest, libretto by Louise-Geneviève Gillot de Saintonge (2023)
- The Dragon of Wantley by John Frederick Lampe (2023)
- Don Quichotte by Georg Philipp Telemann (planned 2024)
- Octavia by Reinhard Keiser (planned 2025)
