= Francisco López Capillas =

Mexican composer (1608–1674)

- Born: c. 1608
- Died: 18 January 1674

Francisco López Capillas (1608–1674), known also as "López of the Chapels," was a Mexican composer and theologian born in Mexico City. He is considered one of the most prolific composers of sacred music in Mexico during the Baroque era.

== Biography ==
He was born Francisco López, the son of Bartolome López, potentially a royal notary, and María de la Trinidad. He was admitted into the Mexico City Cathedral choir in 1625, where he studied early European Gregorian chant and organum under organist and choirmaster Antonio Rodriguez Mata. During this time, it is likely that he enrolled at the University of Mexico and received a bachelor's degree in theology in 1626.

The period of his life between 1626 through 1641 is not well understood, however by 1641 he had found employment as an organist, dulcianist, and cantor at La Catedral de la Puebla de los Angeles, under the directorship of Juan Gutiérrez de Padilla. Puebla at this time was overseen by the Archbishop Juan de Palafox y Mendoza, who greatly supported the city's emergence as a cultural and intellectual haven through various development and infrastructure projects, including the construction of new chapels and cathedrals in the villages surrounding Puebla. In 1641, Capillas was hired on as an assistant organist, a move that allowed the lead organist, Pedro Simón, an opportunity to leave Puebla and assist in the installation of organs in the new churches and schools that were springing up in the surrounding villages. This move also granted Capillas an opportunity to further study the music of European medieval and early renaissance masters including Tomás Luis de Victoria, Clément Janequin, and Giovanni Palestrina.

In 1648, Capillas was brought back to Mexico City to assist Fabián Pérez Ximeno, who had succeeded Mata as the organist and choirmaster of the Catedral de México. In this role, Capillas assisted Pérez Ximeno, oversaw the installation of a new grand organ (built in the style of the ones at Puebla) and developed of a children's choir at the Cathedral. His whereabouts for the next six years are unknown.

In March 1654, he presented a book of his compositions to the authorities of the Mexico City Cathedral. A month later, the chapel's choirmaster, Fabián Ximeno, died. Four days later, López was appointed choirmaster and principal organist "in recognition of his great sufficiency and ability for the ministries" at the Catedral de México. At this point he began signing his name as 'López Capillas' ('López of the Chapels').

He held this position until 1668, when the duties of the organist were separated from the choirmaster. After a five year period of declining health, Capillas died on January 18, 1674. The rediscovery of Capillas' last will and testament in the 1980's renewed scholarly interest in this composer.

== Works ==
He is regarded as the first notable composer born in America and the colonies of New Spain. He composed eight masses, ten magnificats, five works for double chorus, and several other works for various feast days of the liturgical year including one extended work for Holy Week and Easter. He also wrote villancicos and other incidental music to be performed at or in honor of the various cathedrals where he worked.

=== Masses ===
- Missa Pange lingua; 6 voices
- Missa super scalam Aretinam; 5 voices (on hexachord)
- Missa Aufer a nobis; 4 voices (on López motet)
- Missa super Alleluia; 5 voices (on López motet)
- Missa Benedicta sit Sancta Trinitas; 4 voices (on Palestrina motet)
- Missa Quam pulchri sunt gressus tui; 4 voices (on Palestrina motet)
- Missa Re Sol; 4 voices (on Riscos' canción)
- Missa batalla; 6 voices (on Janequin chanson)

=== Motets ===
- Adiuva nos, Deus (part I by Antonio Rodriguez Mata)
- Aufer a nobis
- Christus factus est
- Cui luna, sol et omnia
- Cum iucunditate
- Ecce nunc tempus
- Ego enim
- Et incarnatus est
- In horrore visionis nocturnae
- Lumen ad revelationem
- Quicumque coluerit apostolorum
- Tenebrae factae sunt
- Velum templi

=== Other ===
- 8 magnificats
