= Benjamín Juárez Echenique =

Mexican music conductor and scholar

Benjamin Juarez Echenique is a music conductor and scholar with over four decades of experience in the arts, and was born in Mexico City on July 17, 1951. He studied in Mexico at the National School of Music, National University of Mexico, the California Institute of the Arts, where he obtained his Master of Fine Arts in Music, as well as in Italy, France and England.

He was principal guest conductor and assistant conductor of the State of Mexico Symphony Orchestra from 1979 to 1981; associate conductor of the Mexico City Philharmonic Orchestra from 1983 to 1987; and music director of the Gran Festival de la Ciudad de Mexico in 1989-90. He has lectured and run workshops on music and the arts in Mexico and abroad, where in 1984, Juarez was honored as the first Latin American to conduct an orchestra in China.

He was Head of the Music Department at the National Autonomous University of Mexico (UNAM), Musical Director of the Mexico City’s Grand Festival, and taught at the UNAM, the National Conservatory and the Superior School of Music of Institute of Fine Arts. He also founded the early music group Angelicum of Puebla, devoted to the rescue of the music of the seventeenth century from Puebla’s Cathedral Archives.

Juárez Echenique has also produced and presented hundreds of radio and television programs in Mexico. His recordings of works of Baroque Mexican masters such as Ignacio Jerusalem y Stella, Francisco Delgado, Juan Gutiérrez de Padilla, Manuel Arenzana and Fabián Ximeno for the Urtext label won him a Latin Grammy nomination in 2001. The same year he received the "Mexico Unido en sus valores Culturales" award.

From September 2006 to August 2009 he General Director of Mexico's National Arts Center Centro Nacional de las Artes CENART as the result of a civil service selection process. He was the senior member of Mexico's Civil Service in the cultural sector. He is currently affiliated to the research university Instituto Dr. Jose Ma. Luis Mora.

On August 4, 2010 Benjamin E. Juarez assumed the position of Dean of the Boston University College of Fine Arts.
