= Pacific MusicWorks =

American opera company

Pacific MusicWorks is an opera company in Seattle, Washington that stages performances of baroque opera ranging from full theatrical productions to chamber concerts. The group was founded in 2008, as Pacific OperaWorks, by Stephen Stubbs.

== See also ==
- Seattle Opera
