= Paul O'Dette =

American lutenist, conductor and musicologist (born 1954)

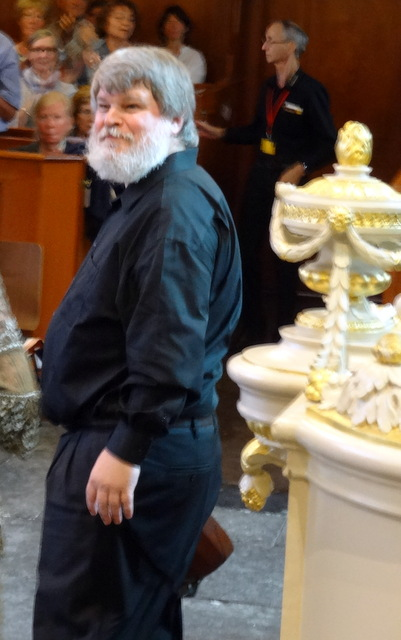
O'Dette at the Festival Oude Muziek 2013 in Utrecht

Paul Raymond O'Dette (born February 2, 1954) is an American lutenist, conductor, and musicologist specializing in early music.

== Biography ==
O'Dette, who was born in Pittsburgh, began playing the electric guitar in a rock band in Columbus, Ohio, where he grew up. Eventually, this led him into playing guitar transcriptions of lute music, and not long after that he opted for the lute (as well as the related archlute, theorbo, and Baroque guitar) as his primary instruments, and now he specializes in the performance of Renaissance and Baroque music. He has made more than 120 recordings, earning five Grammy nominations and numerous other awards. In addition to his activities as a performer, Paul O'Dette is an avid researcher, having worked extensively on the performance and sources of seventeenth-century Italian and English solo song, continuo practices and lute technique.

Since 1976, he has served as Professor of Lute and Director of Early Music at the Eastman School of Music. He is the Co-Artistic Director of the Boston Early Music Festival. He lives in Rochester, New York with his wife Christel Thielmann, who is also a baroque music specialist and Eastman professor.

== Discography ==
=== Solo ===
- The English Lute: Music by John Dowland and William Byrd (1979)
- Early Venetian Lute Music (1982)
- Tabulatures De Leut: Adrian Le Roy, Guillaume de Morlaye, Albert de Rippe, Jean-Paul Paladin (1983)
- John Dowland: Musicke for the Lute (1984)
- Intabolature Da Leuto 'Del Divino' Francesco da Milano (1986)
- Ancient Airs and Dances: 16th Century Songs and Dances for the Lute (1987)
- Robin is to the Greenwood Gone: Elizabethan Lute Music (1987)
- Johannes Hieronymus Kapsberger: Il Tedesco della Tiorba (Pieces For Lute) (1990) (reissued as Baroque Lute Music, Vol. I: Kapsberger)
- Lord Herbert of Cherbury's Lute Book (1992)
- Dolcissima et Amorosa: Early Italian Renaissance Lute Music (1994) (reissued as Lute Music, Volume 2: Early Italian Music)
- John Dowland: 'Opera Omnia', The Complete Lute Works (5 volumes, 1995–1997)
- Alla Venetiana: Early 16th Century Venetian Lute Music (1999), identical material to Early Venetian Lute Music (1982) but re-recorded 1997.
- Robin Hood: Elizabethan Ballad Settings (2001)
- Simone Molinaro: Fantasie, Canzoni e Balli (2001)
- The Royal Lewters: Music of Henry VIII and Elizabeth I's Favourite Lutenists (2002)
- Nicholas Vallet: Le Secret des Muses (2005)
- Daniel Bacheler: The Bachelar's Delight (2006)
- Johann Sebastian Bach: Lute Works, Volume I (2007)
- Melchior Neusidler: Lute Music (2008)
- Marco dall'Aquila: Pieces for Lute (2010)
- Francesco da Milano: Il Divino (2013)
- My Favorite Dowland (2014)
- Un perfaict sonneur de leut Albert de Rippe (2019)

=== Selected Ensemble ===
- Italian Lute Duets, from the 16th and Early 17th Centuries (1979) (with Hopkinson Smith)
- English Lute Duets (1985) (with Jakob Lindberg)
- Antonio Vivaldi: Music for Lute and Mandolin (1986) (with the Parley of Instruments, directed by Roy Goodman and Peter Holman)
- As I Went to Walsingham: Elizabethan Music (1987) (with The Musicians of Swanne Alley, directed by Lyle Nordstrom and Paul O'Dette)
- John Dowland: Songs for tenor and lute (1988) (with Nigel Rogers, tenor)
- The King's Delight: 17th Century Ballads for Voice and Violin Band (1994) (with The King's Noyse, directed by David Douglass)
- Canzonetta: 16th Century Canzoni & Instrumental Dances (1995) (with The King's Noyse, directed by David Douglass) (reissued as Italian Renaissance Dances, Volume 2)
- Spanish Dances: Selections from Lucas Ruiz de Ribayaz's 'Luz y Norte' (1996) (with The Harp Consort, directed by Andrew Lawrence-King)
- The Queen's Delight: 17th Century English Ballads and Dances (1997) (with The King's Noyse, directed by David Douglass)
- ¡Jácaras!: 18th Century Spanish Baroque Guitar Music of Santiago de Murcia (1998) (with Andrew Lawrence-King, Pedro Estevan, Patrick O'Brien, and Steven Player)
- Apollo's Banquet: 17th Century Music from the Publications of John Playford (1998) (with David Douglass, and Andrew Lawrence-King) (reissued as English Country Dances: 17th Century Music from the Publications of John Playford)
- Il Zazzerino: Music of Jacopo Peri (1999) (with Andrew Lawrence-King, Ellen Hargis, and Hille Perl)
- Anthony Holborne: "My Selfe" 16th Century Pavans, Galliards, and Almains (1999) (with The King's Noyse, directed by David Douglass)
- Seaven Teares: Music of John Dowland (2002) (with The King's Noyse, directed by David Douglass)
- Pavaniglia: Dances and Madrigals from 17th-Century Italy (2005) (with Andrew Lawrence-King, and The King's Noyse, directed by David Douglass)
- Le Jardin de Mélodies: 16th Century French Dances and Songs (2006) (with The King's Noyse, directed by David Douglass, and Ellen Hargis)
- The Christmas Album (2006) (with Ellen Hargis)
- Rosenmüller: 17th Century Instrumental and Vocal Music (2008) (with The King's Noyse, directed by David Douglass, and Ellen Hargis)

=== Conductor ===
- Johann Georg Conradi, Ariadne, Boston Early Music Festival Orchestra & Chorus, conducted by Paul O'Dette & Stephen Stubbs 3 CD CPO 2004
- Jean-Baptiste Lully, Thésée, Boston Early Festival Vocal & Chamber Ensembles, conducted by Paul O'Dette & Stephen Stubbs 3 CDs CPO 2007
- Jean-Baptiste Lully, Psyché, Boston Early Festival Orchestra & Chorus, conducted by Paul O'Dette & Stephen Stubbs 3 CDs CPO 2007
- Johann Sebastiani, Matthäus Passion, Boston Early Music Festival Chamber Ensemble, conducted by Paul O'Dette & Stephen Stubbs CD CPO 2007
- Marc-Antoine Charpentier, Actéon H.481, La Pierre Philososphale H.501, Boston Early Festival Vocal & Chamber Ensembles, conducted by Paul O'Dette e& Stephen Stubbs CD CPO 2010
- John Blow, Vénus et Adonis, Boston Early Festival Vocal & Chamber Ensembles, conducted by Paul O'Dette & Stephen Stubbs CD CPO 2011
- Marc-Antoine Charpentier, La Descente d'Orphée aux Enfers H.488, La Couronne de fleurs H.486, Boston Early Festival Vocal & Chamber Ensembles, CD CPO 2013
- George Frideric Handel, Acis and Galatea, Boston Early Music Festival Vocal & Chamber Ensembles, conducted by Paul O'Dette & Stephen Stubbs 2 CDs CPO 2013
- Agostino Stefanni, Niobe Regina di Tebe, Boston Early Music Festival Orchestra, conducted by Paul O'Dette et Stephen Stubbs 3 CDs CPO 2015
- Agostino Stefanni, Duets of Love and Passion, Boston Early Music Festival Chamber Ensemble, conducted by Paul O'Dette & Stephen Stubbs 3 CD CPO 2017
- George Frideric Handel, Almira, Boston Early Music Festival Orchestra, conducted by Paul O'Dette & Stephen Stubbs CD CPO 2018
- Marc-Antoine Charpentier, Les Plaisirs de Versailles H.480, Les Arts Florissants H.487, Boston Early Festival Vocal & Chamber Ensembles, conducted by Paul O'Dette & Stephen Stubbs CD CPO 2019
- Michel-Richard de Lalande, Les Fontaines de Versailles, Le Concert d'Esculape, Boston Early Festival Vocal & Chamber Ensembles, conducted by Paul O'Dette & Stephen Stubbs CD CPO 2020
