= Bernardo Gianoncelli =

Italian composer (–1650)

Bernardo Gianoncelli (died before 1650) was an Italian composer and lutenist in first half of 17th century.

== Life and works ==
Gianoncelli (also known as “Il Bernardello”) was one of last Italian composers for the baroque lute. Very little is known about his life. In 1650 his widow published a collection of his compositions under the title Il liuto di Bernardo Gianoncelli (only surviving copy in Biblioteca Marciana library in Venice). The collection is made up of several suites, arranged according to key. They are among the last Italian contributions to the development of the suite as a closed musical form. Gianocelli's compositions reveal a new style that combines improved counterpoint with homophonic melodies. Gianoncelli’s best‐known pieces are three instrumental correntes and Bergamasca, from which a lute arrangement was made by Oscar Chilesotti and an orchestral version by Ottorino Respighi.

== Selected recordings ==
Three Correntes; Elissa Edwards and Richard Kolb, Christian Zimmermann

Bergamasca; Paul O'Dette
