= Ingrid Stampa =

Ingrid Stampa (born February 23, 1950) is a German member of the Schoenstatt Movement and professor of viola da gamba who worked with Pope Benedict XVI. Hille Perl was one of her students. She had been a subject of some debate during the Vatican leaks scandal, but continued to work in the Secretariat of State. She denied some things stated of her in regard to the scandal, but also stated leaker Paolo Gabriele "has a great love for and a high opinion of the Pope and the Church" and had a good family.
