= Circé (Desmarets) =

Opera composed by Henri Desmarets

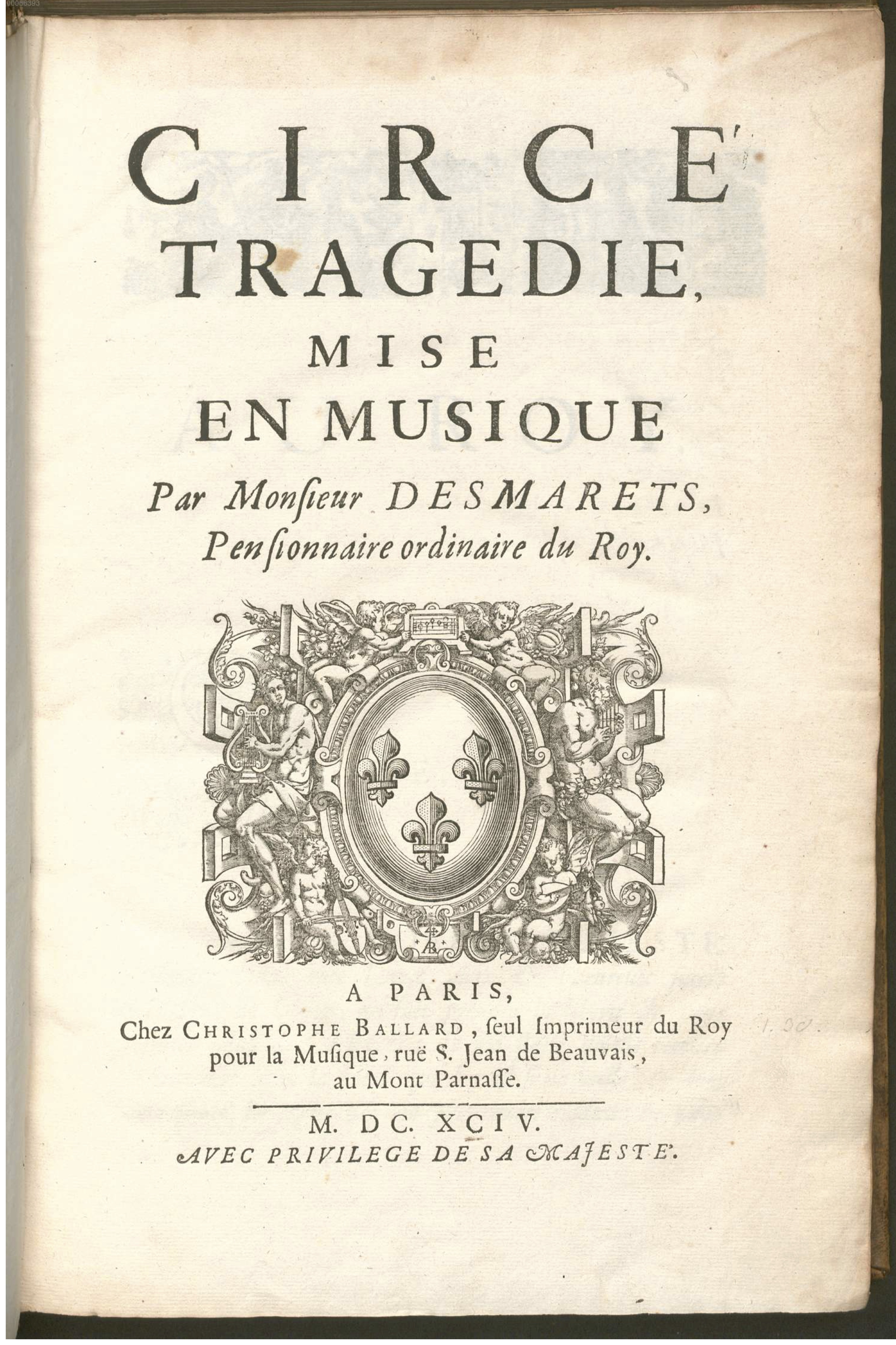
The front cover of the score to Circe by Desmarets.

Circé is an opera composed by Henri Desmarets to a libretto by Louise-Geneviève Gillot de Saintonge and first performed at the Académie Royale de Musique (the Paris Opera) on 1 October 1694. It takes the form of a tragédie en musique in a prologue and five acts. The piece concerns the sorceress Circe who appears in Greek mythology and in Homer's Odyssey.

== Louise-Geneviève Gillot de Saintonge ==
The libretto for Circé was written by Louise Genevieve Gillot de Saintonge (1650–1718) who based it on the Greek mythological character of that name. She also wrote the libretto for the opera Didon, also composed by Desmarets.

== Henri Desmarets ==
Henri Desmarets (1661–1741) was a French Baroque era composer associated with the court of King Louis XIV. He was considered very talented and became best known for his sacred grand motets. He spent his early years in the shadow of the king's favorite, Lully, and after Lully's death in 1687 composed several successful operas, but then a dispute with the family of the girl he eloped with in 1697 forced him to live in exile for twenty years and he then spent another twenty without a position in France.

== Performance and reception ==
Circe was first performed on 1 October 1694 at the Paris Opera. It was not received well; most of Desmarets' operas were said to have mimicked Lully's music in a way that produced material similar but inferior to it. No fault of Desmarets', Lully's monopoly on court music cast a shadow in which any potential individuality Desmarets had was quashed. This may have contributed to the generally negative sentiment toward his work evident in reviews written at the time.

The libretto was published in Amsterdam in 1695.

== Circe in mythology ==
Circe appears often in ancient literature as an enchantress well-versed in potions and sorcery, seen at times as the prototype of the sexual and predatory woman. She is best known as a character in Homer's Odyssey, where she falls in love with Odysseus and lures him and his crew to a wine- and potion-laced feast where she turns several of the men into swine. They all remain on her island for a year until she frees them and directs Odysseus home.

== Tragédie en musique ==
Circe falls under the category of tragedie en musique (also known as tragedie lyrique), a genre of opera formed and popularized in the Baroque era by Lully and carried on until the end of the period. Operas in this genre served the purpose of edifying the king and exemplify regality with stately rhythmic structures and consonant harmonies. Most were based on Greek myth and tragedy, hence its name, literally "tragedy set to music."

== Score ==
Though the similarities between Desmarets' and Lully's music were written off by bitter critics as the sign of a composer failing to come into his own, the use of one of Desmarets' musical structures in later music suggests quietly admitted approval within the musical community. At the time one trend was to highlight low voices and sonorities, which the composer furthered through choruses that featured a single exposed melody to be sung by bass voices as seen in the songes affreux in Circe.

The prologue is a good example of the homophony characteristic of French music at the time the opera was written, and includes points of imitation, or repeated material in succession between different instrument and voice parts which may mimic a fugue.

The most popular excerpt of the piece is the rigaudon transcribed by Ernst Pauer for piano.

== Recordings ==
- Circé - Lucile Richardot, Aaron Sheehan, Teresa Wakim, Jesse Blumberg, Amanda Forsythe, Douglas Williams, Boston Early Music Festival Orchestra, Paul O'Dette, Stephen Stubbs. Boston Early Music Festival 3CD CPO 2023 (recorded in anticipation of performances in June 2023)
