= Stephen Stubbs =

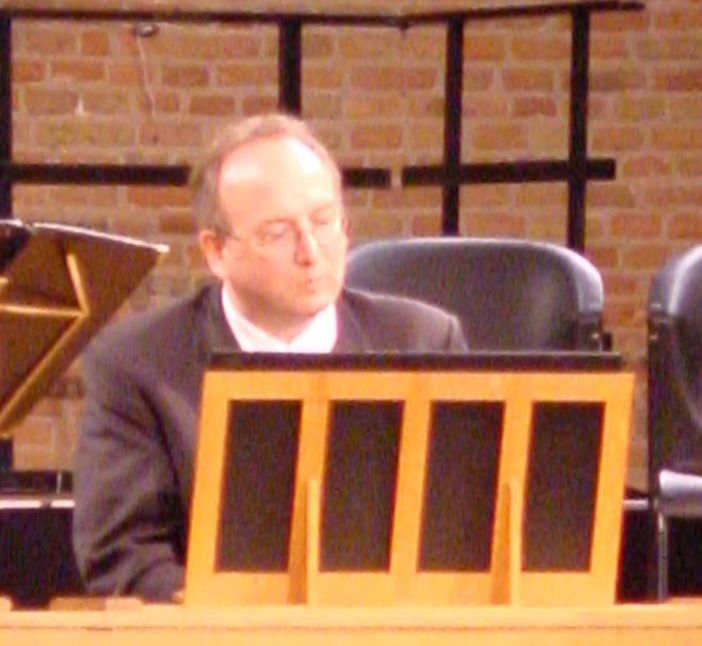
Stephen Stubbs

Stephen Stubbs (born 1951) is a lutenist and music director and has been a leading figure in the American early music scene for nearly thirty years.

Born in Seattle, he studied harpsichord and composition at the University of Washington where, at the same time, he began playing the harpsichord and the lute. After graduation he moved to in England and Holland to study, and gave his debut concert in London's Wigmore Hall in 1976. From 1981 to 2013, Stubbs taught at the University of the Arts Bremen in Germany. In 2013, he became an artist in residence at the University of Washington in Seattle. He has performed extensively with his ensembles Tragicomedia and Teatro Lirico, and conducted baroque operas worldwide. He has recorded numerous albums with other famous ensembles like the Hilliard Ensemble and with Andrew Lawrence-King.

He moved back to Seattle in 2006. There he established the Seattle Academy of Baroque Opera, the Pacific MusicWorks early music performance series, and is an adjunct professor at Cornish College of the Arts. He is artistic co-director (with Paul O'Dette) of the Boston Early Music Festival.

On February 8, 2015, Stubbs won a Grammy Award for Best Opera Recording for: Charpentier: La descente d'Orphée aux enfers H 488 & La Couronne de fleurs H.486, Paul O'Dette & Stephen Stubbs, conductors; Aaron Sheehan; Renate Wolter-Seevers, producer (Boston Early Music Festival Chamber Ensemble; Boston Early Music Festival Vocal Ensemble). In 2013, he recorded : Charpentier’s Actéon H.481, La Pierre Philosophale H.501 and in 2019 Les Plaisirs de Versailles H.480, Les Arts Florissants H.487.

== Selected Recordings ==
- Johann Georg Conradi, Ariadne, Boston Early music Festival Orchestra & Chorus, conducted by Paul O'Dette & Stephen Stubbs 3 CDs CPO 2004
- Jean-Baptiste Lully, Thésée, Boston Early Festival Vocal & Chamber Ensembles, conducted by Paul O'Dette & Stephen Stubbs 3 CDs CPO 2007
- Jean-Baptiste Lully, Psyché, Boston Early Festival Orchestra & Chorus, conducted by Paul O'Dette & Stephen Stubbs 3 CDs CPO 2007
- Marc-Antoine Charpentier, Actéon H.481, La Pierre Philososphale H.501, Boston Early Festival Vocal & Chamber Ensembles, conducted by Paul O'Dette e& Stephen Stubbs CD CPO 2010
- John Blow, Vénus et Adonis, Boston Early Festival Vocal & Chamber Ensembles, conducted by Paul O'Dette & Stephen Stubbs CD CPO 2011
- Marc-Antoine Charpentier, La Descente d'Orphée aux Enfers H.488, La Couronne de fleurs H.486, Boston Early Festival Vocal & Chamber Ensembles, conducted by Paul O'Dette et Stephen Stubbs CD CPO 2013
- Johann Sebastiani, Matthäus Passion, Boston Early music Festival Chamber Ensemble, conducted by Paul O'Dette & Stephen Stubbs CD CPO 2007
- George Frideric Handel, Acis and Galatea, Boston Early Music Festival Vocal & Chamber Ensembles, conducted by Paul O'Dette & Stephen Stubbs 2 CDs CPO 2013
- Agostino Stefanni, Niobe Regina di Tebe, Boston early Music Festival Orchestra, conducted by Paul O'Dette et Stephen Stubbs 3 CDs CPO 2015
- Agostino Stefanni, Duets of Love and Passion, Boston Early music Festival Chamber Ensemble, conducted by Paul O'Dette & Stephen Stubbs CD CPO 2017
- George Frideric Handel, Almira, Boston Early Music Festival Orchestra, conducted by Paul O'Dette & Stephen Stubbs 4 CDs CPO 2018
- Marc-Antoine Charpentier, Les Plaisirs de Versailles H.480, Les Arts Florissants H.487, Boston Early Festival Vocal & Chamber Ensembles, conducted by Paul O'Dette & Stephen Stubbs CD CPO 2019
- Michel-Richard de Lalande, Les Fontaines de Versailles, Le Concert d'Esculape, Boston Early Festival Vocal & Chamber Ensembles, conducted by Paul O'Dette & Stephen Stubbs CD CPO 2020
