= Rome Symphony Orchestra =

Rome Symphony Orchestra (RSO) is a professional U.S. orchestra located in Rome, Georgia. The organization was founded in 1921, disbanded around 1930, and reestablished in 1948.The RSO is currently the oldest symphony in the South.

== Conductors ==
- 1921–1930: Paul Nixon
- 1930–1948: Organization disbanded
- 1948–1976: Helen Dean Rhodes
- 1976–1995: John Carruth
- 1995–1998: Tristan Foison
- 1998–1999: Guest Conductors
- 1999–2007: Phillip Rice
- 2007–2008: Guest conductors
- 2008–2015: Richard Prior
- 2015–2016: Dr. Sam Baltzer
- 2017–present: Jeffrey Sean Dokken
