= Simone Molinaro =

Italian composer

Simone Molinaro (c. 1570 – May 1636) was a composer of the late Renaissance in Italy. He was especially renowned for his lute music.

== Life and career ==
Molinaro was born in Genoa. He studied music with his uncle, Giovanni Battista Dalla Gostena, who was maestro di cappella at Genoa Cathedral. In 1593, Gostena was murdered, and Molinaro succeeded him in his post at the Cathedral in 1599. The same year he published Intavolatura di liuto, containing lute works both by himself and by Gostena. In addition to his lute works, Molinaro composed a large number of sacred choral music, most of which does not survive completely because of missing partbooks. However, some five-voice motets have been preserved in the collections of Hassler and Schadaeus. Molinaro died in May 1636 in Genoa.

Molinaro also served as editor of the works of Carlo Gesualdo, publishing editions of that composer's madrigals in 1585 and 1613.

== Assessment ==
In his dances for lute, according to Eitner, Molinaro "despises all counterpoint, and shows himself as a pure melodist and harmonist, but both in so simple and pretty a way, that they all have something uncommonly attractive". Molinaro wrote at the time when, according to Paul Henry Lang, lute music was reaching its apogee. Along with Giovanni Terzi, Molinaro's lute music introduces "a finished, graceful, and sovereign instrumental style, capable of all shades of expression and of a technique which we usually associate only with the vocal music of the period".

The 1613 publication of the Gesualdo madrigals was ground-breaking because it presented Gesualdo's music in full score as opposed to partbook format.

Molinaro's music was used as the basis for "Balletto detto il Conte Orlando" of the Ancient Airs and Dances Suite No. 1 by Ottorino Respighi.

== Works ==
=== Lute ===
- Intavolatura di liuto libro 1, Venice, 1599

=== Secular Vocal music ===
- Il 1 libro di canzonette a 3 e 4 voci, Venice, 1595
- Il 1 libro de Madrigali a 5 voci, Venice, 1599
- Il 2 libro delle Canzonette a 3 voci, Venice, 1600
- Madrigali a 5 voci, Loano 1615

=== Sacred Vocal music ===
- Motectorum quinis et Missae denis vocibus liber I, Venice, 1597
- Il 2 libro de Mottetti a 8 voci, Milan, 1601
- Il 1 libro de mottetti a 5 voci, con la partitura per sonar l'organo, Milan, 1604
- Il 1 libro de Magnificat a 4 voci, con basso continuato, Milan, 1605
- Concerti ecclesiastisi a 2 e a 4 voci...con la sua part. per l'organo, Venice, 1605
- Il 3 libro de Mottetti a 5 voci con il basso continuato, Venice, 1609
- Fatiche spirituali...libro 1 a 6 voci, Venice, 1610
- Fatiche spirituali....libro 2 a 6 voci, Venice, 1610
- Concerti a 1 e 2 voci con la part. per l'organo, Milan, 1612
- Passio Domini Iesu Christi secundum Matthaeum, Marcum, Lucam, et Ioannem, Loano, 1616

== Bibliography ==
- Grove, George; J.A. Fuller Maitland (1907). A Dictionary of Music and Musicians, volume iii. London: Macmillan. pp. 240–241. OCLC 407077. Article "Molinaro, Simone".
- Cummings, Robert (n.d.). "Simone Molinaro: Biography".
