= Regula Mühlemann =

Swiss operatic soprano (born 1986)

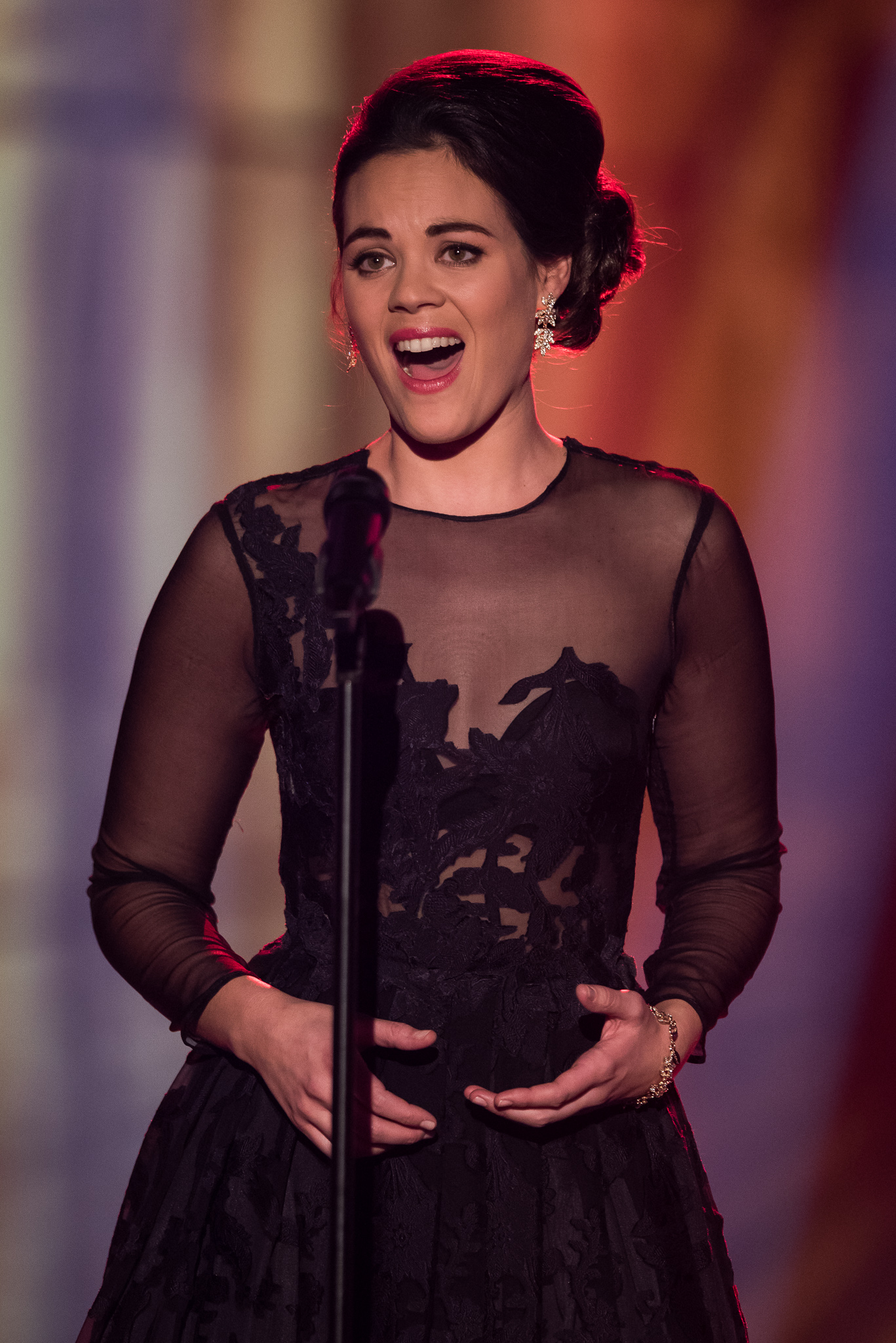
- Mühlemann in 2016
- Born: 7 January 1986 (age 40); Adligenswil, Canton of Lucerne, Switzerland
- Education: Lucerne School of Music
- Occupation: Opera singer (soprano)
- Website: regulamuehlemann.com

Regula Mühlemann (born 7 January 1986) is a Swiss operatic soprano.

== Biography ==
Mühlemann was born in Adligenswil, Switzerland, and studied voice with Barbara Locher at the Academy of Music in Lucerne in 2010, where she graduated with honors with a Master of Arts. Her first appearances on the opera stage included the following roles: Maturina in Gazzaniga's Don Giovanni Tenorio, Barbarina in Mozart's The Marriage of Figaro, Papagena in Mozart's The Magic Flute, and Doralice in Scarlatti's Il trionfo dell'onore.

In Jens Neubert's film version of Weber's opera Der Freischütz, Mühlemann played the role of Ännchen and was praised by critics. The Neue Zürcher Zeitung saw her as "a discovery of the first order." In the 2010 and 2011 opera seasons, Mühlemann appeared at the Lucerne Theatre as soloist in several operas, such as The Magic Flute and Il trionfo dell'onore.

== Discography ==
=== CDs ===
- 2014: Gioachino Rossini – Petite messe solennelle, Peter Dijkstra, Chor des Bayerischen Rundfunks (Sony Classical)
- 2016: Wolfgang Amadeus Mozart – Le nozze di Figaro (as Barbarina), Yannick Nézet-Séguin, Chamber Orchestra of Europe (Deutsche Grammophon)
- 2016: Mozart Arias, Umberto Benedetti Michelangeli, Kammerorchester Basel (Sony Classical)
- 2017: Georg Philipp Telemann – Reformations-Oratorium (Sony Classical)
- 2017: Cleopatra: Baroque Arias, Robin Peter Müller, La Folia Barockorchester (Sony Classical)
- 2018: Wolfgang Amadeus Mozart – La clemenza di Tito (as Servilia), Yannick Nézet-Séguin, Chamber Orchestra of Europe (Deustche Grammophon)
- 2019: Wolfgang Amadeus Mozart - Die Zauberflöte (as Papagena), Yannick Nézet-Séguin, Orchestre de Chambre d'Europe (Deutsche Grammophon)
- 2019: "Lider der Heimat/Songs from Home" (Sony Classical)
- 2020: "Mozart Arias II" – Kammerorchester Basel, Umberto Benedetti Michelangeli (Sony Classical)
- 2022: "Fairy Tales" – CHAARTS Chamber Artists (Sony Classical)

=== DVDs ===
- 2010: Carl Maria von Weber – Der Freischütz (as Ännchen) (Constantin Film)
- 2013: Wolfgang Amadeus Mozart – Die Zauberflöte (as Papagena), Simon Rattle, Berliner Philharmoniker
- 2014: Christoph Willibald Gluck – Orfeo ed Euridice (as Amore), Václav Luks, Collegium 1704 (Arthaus Musik)
- 2014: Gaetano Donizetti – L'elisir d'amore (as Gianetta), Pablo Heras-Casado, Balthasar-Neumann-Chor und -Ensemble (Deutsche Grammophon)
