= Tigrane (Hasse) =

Opera by Johann Adolph Hasse

Tigrane is an opera by Johann Adolph Hasse to a libretto by an anonymous arranger following Francesco Silvani which had already been used Vivaldi for his own opera of the same name. The opera premiered 4 November 1729 at the Teatro San Bartolomeo, Naples.

== Recordings ==
- "Solca il mar" Max Emanuel Cenčić on Rokoko - Hasse arias Armonia Atenea George Petrou Decca 2014
- "Solca il mar e nel periglio" Sonia Prina on Baroque Divas Armonia Atenea George Petrou Decca 2015 ( note: "Fra quest’ombre" Vivica Genaux is mislabeled on the recording as from Tigrane, but is actually from the opera Solimano.)
