= Juan García de Zéspedes =

Mexican composer, singer, viol player and teacher

Juan García de Zéspedes (ca. 1619 – 5 August 1678) was a Mexican composer, singer, viol player, and teacher.

== Biography ==
He is thought to have been born in Puebla, Mexico. As a boy he was a soprano in the choir at Puebla Cathedral in 1630 under Juan Gutiérrez de Padilla. In 1664 he succeeded maestro Gutiérrez in an interim capacity. The title maestro became permanent in 1670. Although censured by the cathedral chapter more than once over disagreements as to his duties, he had a long career ended by his paralysis late in life. He died in Puebla.

His musical compositions ranged from sacred pieces to secular pieces inspired by folk music.

== Works ==
- Convidando está la noche (on Youtube)
- A la mar va mi Niña
- Plange quasi virgo plebs mea
- Salve regina
- Guaracha: Ay Que Me Abraso

== Bibliography ==
- Renaissance and baroque musical sources in the Americas, R. Stevenson, 1970
- Christmas Music from Baroque Mexico, R. Stevenson, 1974
- Tesoro de la Música Polifónica en México, F. Ramírez, 1981
