= Kristin von der Goltz =

German musician (born 1966)

Kristin (Gräfin) von der Goltz (born 2 May 1966, in Würzburg, West Germany) is a German-Norwegian cellist. She plays music from the baroque repertoire, but she also performs music from later periods. Her five older brothers include the violinist and conductor Gottfried von der Goltz.

Her first teachers were her parents, Georg Conrad von der Goltz and Kirsti Hjort. She later studied with William Pleeth in London and others. She plays regularly with the London Philharmonic Orchestra and the Hanover Band, and from 1991 to 2004 was a member of the Freiburger Barockorchester. Since 1992 von der Goltz has been with the acclaimed Trio Vivente, with Anne Katharina Schreiber (violin) and Jutta Ernst (piano). She went on to teach.

== Partial discography ==
- 2004: Jacob Klein (1688–1748): 6 Sonaten für Violoncello und Basso continuo op. 4 (with Lee Santana, lute, and Hille Perl, viola da gamba)
- 2006: Joseph-Marie-Clément dall'Abaco (1710–1805): 11 Capricen für Violoncello
