= Actéon (opera) =

Opera by Marc-Antoine Charpentier

- Opera by Marc-Antoine Charpentier
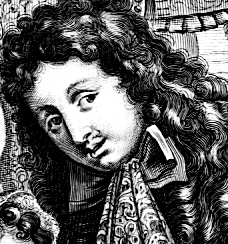
- Marc-Antoine Charpentier in 1682
- Language: French
- Based on: Ovid's Metamorphoses

Actéon (Actaeon) is a Pastorale in the form of a miniature tragédie en musique in six scenes by Marc-Antoine Charpentier, Opus H.481 & H.481a, based on a Greek myth.

== History ==
It is highly unlikely that this opera was written for performance at the Hôtel de Guise, the palatial Parisian residence of Marie de Lorraine, Duchess of Guise, Charpentier's protectress. (The work was copied into a Roman-number notebook, which strongly suggests that it was an outside commission; and the overall distribution of voices and instruments does not match that of the Guise ensemble of the time.) Although the patron and the place of performance remain unknown, the date can be determined with considerable accuracy: the spring hunting season of 1684. Later that year (presumably for the fall hunting season) it was revised to change the title role from an haute-contre role (perhaps originally sung by Charpentier) to a soprano part, and was at that time renamed Actéon changé en biche.

The author of the French libretto is unknown, however the plot is based on a story in Ovid's Metamorphoses. In this story the hunter Actaeon (Actéon in French) accidentally discovers the goddess Diana (Diane in French) bathing with her attendants. He tries to hide himself, but is discovered, and Diane in anger turns him into a stag, and he is pursued and torn apart by his own hounds.

This story is the same one recounted in the aria "Oft she visits this lone mountain" from Purcell's Dido and Aeneas, first performed in 1689.

In 2015, Ayrshire Opera, led by David Douglas, translated the opera into Scots and performed it as part of a community project.

== Roles ==
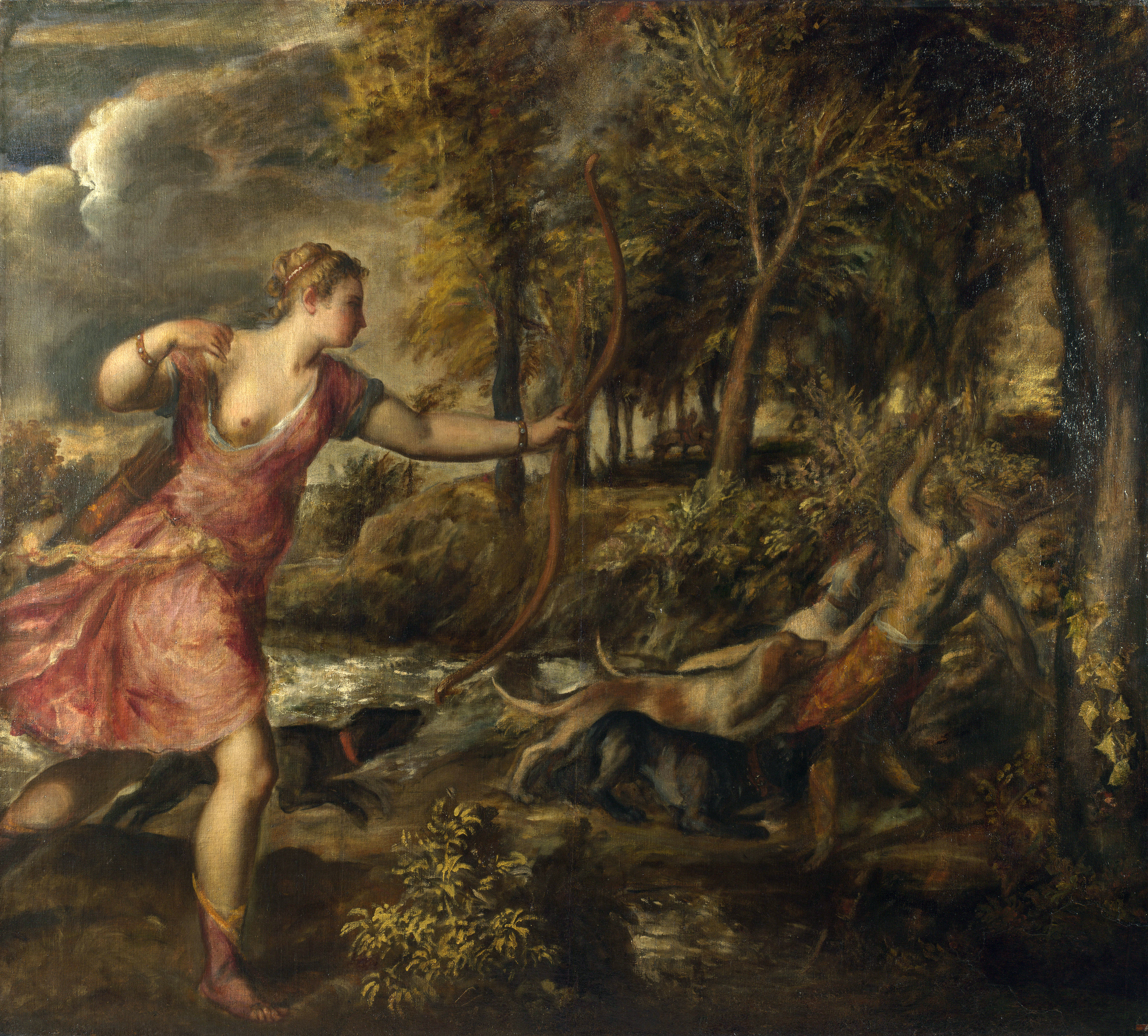
The Death of Actaeon by Titian (National Gallery, London)

| Role | Voice type | Premiere Cast, 1683–85 (Conductor: – ) |
|---|---|---|
| Actéon, a hunter | haute-contre | Charpentier (?) |
| Diane, Goddess of the hunt | soprano | Jacqueline-Geneviève de Brion |
| Junon, Queen of the gods | mezzo-soprano | |
| Hyale | mezzo-soprano | |
| Aréthuze | soprano | |
| Daphné | soprano | |

== Selected recordings ==
- conducted by William Christie, Les Arts Florissants CD. Harmonia Mundi Musique d'Abord (1982). Catalog# 1951095. OCLC 808012772
- conducted by Paul O'Dette and Stephen Stubbs, Boston Early Music Festival CD. cpo (2009). Catalog# 777 613–2. OCLC 1184262121
- conducted by Nicolas Achten (H.481 & H.481a), Scherzi Musicali. CD Ricercar 2026
