= La Folia Barockorchester =

German early music orchestra

- Baroque orchestra
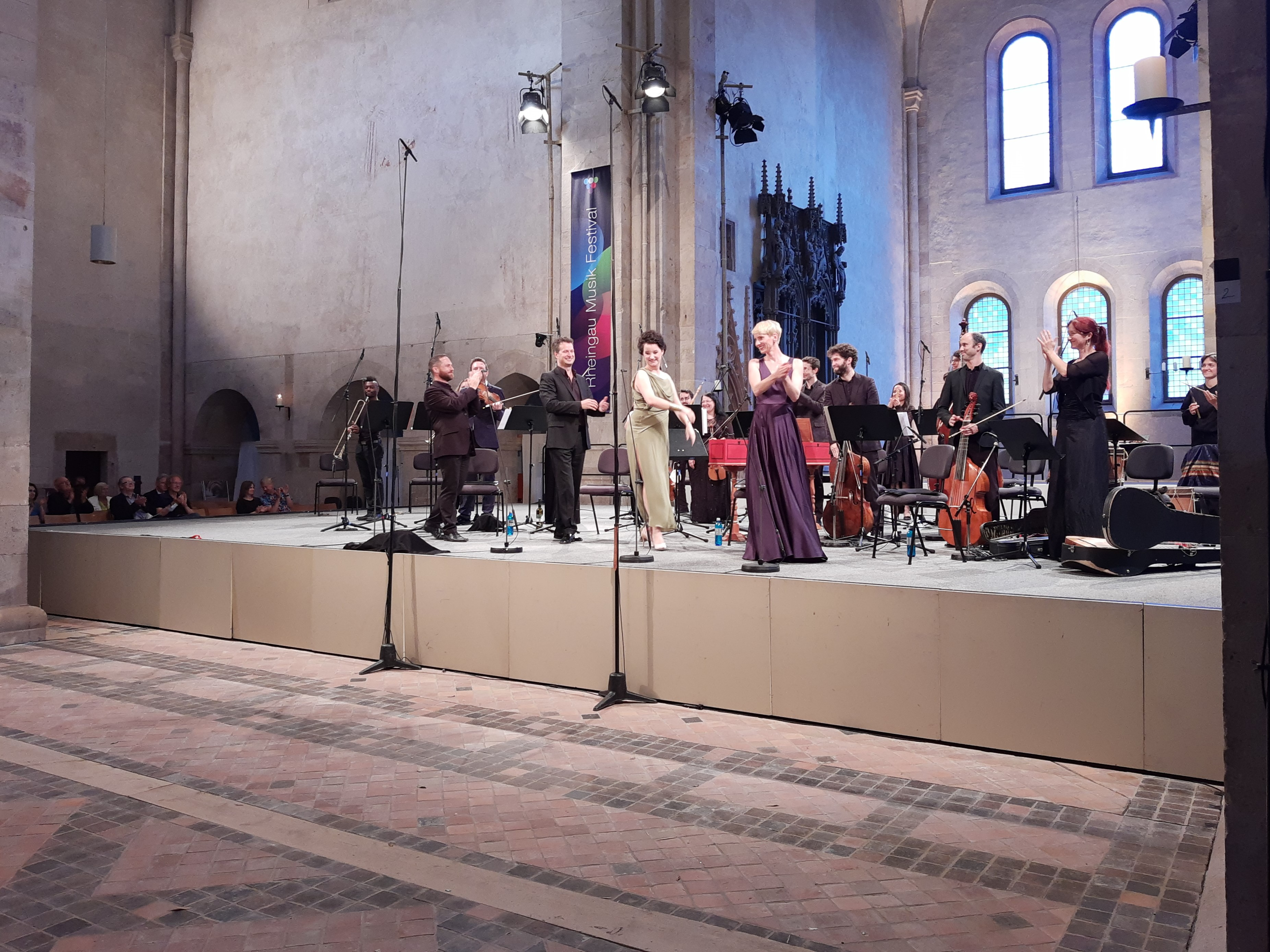
- Orchestra with vocal soloists at Eberbach Abbey, Rheingau Musik Festival, 12 August 2021
- Founded: 2007
- Location: Dresden, Saxony, Germany
- Principal conductor: Robin Peter Müller
- Website: www.lafoliabarockorchester.net

The La Folia Barockorchester is a Baroque orchestra dedicated to historically informed performance. It was founded in Dresden, Saxony, Germany, in 2007 by Robin Peter Müller, who has been its artistic director and concert master. Named after "La Folia", it is focused on music that was performed at the court of Dresden, which they have played at international festivals, and recorded.

== History ==
The orchestra La Folia Barockorchester was founded in Dresden in 2007, dedicated to historically informed performance. Founder Robin Peter Müller is its artistic director and concert master. It is named after "La Folia", a Baroque form inviting to bold creativity. The orchestra is focused on the music of the 17th and 18th centuries, such as works by Antonio Vivaldi and George Frederic Handel. The musicians from Dresden are especially interested in music performed at the court of Dresden, including music by Johann Adolph Hasse, Johann David Heinichen and Antonio Lotti. In 2017, they made the first recording of rediscovered anonymous violin concertos, titled Rediscovered Treasures from Dresden. The works were found in Schrank No. II behind the organ of the Dresden Hofkirche, where they had survived several fires. The cabinet contained manuscripts that Johann Georg Pisendel, concert master of the Hofkapelle for 40 years, had made as copies when traveling and studying in Italy. The musicians chose not to try to discover the identity of the composers, but let the music speak for itself. A reviewer noted:

These engaging performances from La Folia, so full of detail, are often infused with the spirit of the dance and never feel rushed. It's hard to fault the fresh, vibrant and buoyant playing supplying dance-like Allegros, and Adagios and Largos that feel calmly meditative or dreamily reflective.

The size of the orchestra varies depending on the project, from a small ensemble to a late-Baroque orchestra. They have collaborated with notable soloists, including Dorothee Mields, Regula Mühlemann, Hille Perl, Simone Kermes, Dorothee Oberlinger, Maurice Steger and Jan Vogler.

In 2021, a concert in the Basilica of Eberbach Abbey as part of the Rheingau Musik Festival presented music from Baroque opera, mainly Purcell's King Arthur and The Fairy-Queen, with four vocal soloists including Anna Prohaska. Titled "Glorious Revolution", it was aired live by many stations as part of the ARD Radiofestival.

== Recordings ==
- 2014: Vivaldi: Concerti furiosi. Deutsche Harmonia Mundi/Sony
- 2014: Concerti di Venezia by Vivaldi, Nicola Porpora and Benedetto Marcello. Sony Classical
- 2015: Vivaldi: Le quattro stagioni. Stockfisch Records
- 2017: Cleopatra. Baroque Arias by Handel, Hasse, Giovanni Legrenzi a.o., with Regula Mühlemann (soprano), Sony Classical
- 2017: Händel with Dorothee Mields and Hille Perl, Deutsche Harmonia Mundi/Sony
- 2017: Rediscovered treasures from Dresden, Deutsche Harmonia Mundi/Sony
