= Louise-Geneviève Gillot de Saintonge =

French femme de lettres & librettist

- Born: 1650; Paris, France
- Died: 24 March 1718 (aged 67–68); Paris, France
- Known for: Libretti

Louise-Geneviève Gillot de Saintonge (sometimes Sainctonge), born Gillot de Beaucourt, (1650 – 24 March 1718) was a French femme de lettres and celebrated librettist. She was the first woman to have a work to which she contributed performed at the Royal Academy of Music in France, Didon.

== Early life ==
The daughter of Pierre Gillot de Beaucourt and Geneviève de Gomez de Vasconcelle, a novelist, playwright, and descendant of Portuguese nobility, Louise-Geneviève Gillot de Beaucourt married M. de Saintonge, a politician, and thus changed her name to Gillot de Saintonge. Saintonge's early life affected her future, as she was the daughter of a writer and translator, her mother, Louise-Geneviève de Gomez de Vasconcelle. Her mother was a descendant of the Portuguese royal family, which aided Sainctonge in providing an account of her relative, Dom Antoine. Sainctonge's father worked in law, however, which provided Gomez de Vasconcelle with the time and resources to write pieces that would come to influence Sainctonge.

== Marriage and family ==
Saintonge's maiden name was Gillot de Beaucourt, but she then married a man by the name of Monsieur de Sainctonge, which made her change her name to Gillot de Beaucourt). This is one of the more important points in her personal life, because she retained part of her maiden name, and part of her married name. Saintonge had two daughters—not a lot of information exists on them, however—but she does talk about supporting them by writing pieces very frequently near the end of her career.

== Career ==
Saintonge began her professional career by having a work of hers celebrating the return to health for the king of France at the time, King Louis XIV, performing "Idyll sung in the [royal] apartments for the King's return to health" (Idille chantée aux apartemens sur le Rotour de la Santé du Roi) at court. After her original success, Sainctonge wrote the libretto for the Didon (Dido). This work was so successful that it received multiple performances, and a revival in Paris in 1704, as well as receiving the attention of the king. Saintonge was asked to present a copy of the Dido to him—she described this as the best moment of her life. The next large performance was Circe, which again received much acclaim. Soon afterwards, she was asked to write a piece entitled "The Charms of the Seasons (1695)," (Les Charmes des Saisons) an opera with lyrics—as was the common trend of the time—however a different writer was chosen over her own work. In 1696, Saintonge published two works: Poésies Galantes, and Secret History of Lord Antoine King of Portugal, Drawn from the Memoirs of G. Vasconcellos de Figueredo. The librettist wrote a few more works before publishing a complete collection of her works in Dijon. Saintonge was a part of a group of women writers who were publishing more frequently than ever. The Mercure Galant even mentions the works of Saintonge as being blessed by the muses.

== Les Charmes des Saisons (The Charms of the Seasons) ==
This specific piece was one of the most important pieces in Saintonge's career, due to the fact that it was one of the first major challenges that Saintonge faced. This piece is a ballet set to lyrics—one of the major profitable changes in theatre during this time. Saintonge finished this piece in less than 15 days, a feat not generally achieved by the general public, and even less so by females in this time frame. The reason it was done so quickly, was because of the potential for a production to take place as soon as there was completion of the piece. Attempting to profit off of the success of the rising genre, Saintonge, and her composer, Henri Desmarets, worked together to form the lyrical ballet. This ballet would come to be beat out by a similarly themed ballet set to lyrics—a great blow of disruption to both Saintonge and Desmarets. Saintonge would come to comment on this later on in her publication of Poésies Galantes, in which she mentions her great displeasure for how her peers handled these things, essentially stating that these peers stole her ideas.

== Legacy ==
Along with revivals for her biggest work, Didon (Dido) (1696), her other works live on with analyses and reprinting. The copy of Saintonge's Didon that was presented to the king still exists in the Bibliothèque Nationale. Because of the 5 acts in the original production, and the movement of making sure her content was palatable to a larger audience, a lot has since been changed in Didon, namely the number of acts from 5 to 3, and having Dido no longer take her own life on stage, but off stage, while a narration by other characters occurs on stage.

== Works ==
- Poésies Galantes J. Guignard, Paris, in-12. (1696)
  - Actually meaning "Brave Poetry," Poésies Galantes was one of the few sources we have of Saintonge being capable of using her own voice in her media, as she mentions the struggle she had with Les Charmes des Saisons.
- Poésies Diverses de Mme de Sainctonge, 2nd edition A. de Fay, Dijon (1714)
  - Saintonge's final work—an anthology of works in which she follows her career from beginning to end.
- Histoire Secrète de Dom Antoine, Roi de Portugal, J. Guignard, Paris (1696)
  - This piece follows an account on the history of the King of Portugal.
- Didon, tragédie en musique with music by Desmarest, impr. de C. Ballard, Paris (1693) Read online on Gallica
  - Saintonge's original masterpiece: this play follows Dido as she faces the stress of marriage to a man she does not love, and the want to marry the man she loves.
- Circé, Tragédie en Musique presented by the Académie Royale de Musique; music by Henry Desmarets, (1694) by A. Schelte (in Amsterdam according to the copy printed in Paris), (1695) Read online on Gallica
  - Circé follows the tale of Circe and Odysseus as she gives food and drink to him and his sailor friends, and then graciously lets him leave for home after making him stay on her island for a year.
- data BNF
