= Lucas Ruiz de Ribayaz =

Spanish harpist and composer

Lucas Ruiz de Ribayaz y Fonseca (1626-after 1677) was a Spanish harpist and composer for lute and guitar.

Ruiz de Ribayaz was born in Santa Maria de Ribarredonda, near Burgos in northern Spain. Professionally, he was a theologian, but with an extensive knowledge of music, both as a scholar and performer.

With the composer Tomás de Torrejón y Velasco, he was among the entourage of Pedro Fernández de Castro y Andrade, Count of Lemos, when he was appointed the Spanish viceroy to Peru. Ribayaz returned to Madrid some time before the publication of a harp and guitar manual, Luz, y norte musical, para caminar por las cifras de la guitarra españióla, y arpa (Madrid, 1677). (The Spanish title means, "A Lantern and Musical Guiding Star, by which to walk through the music of the Spanish guitar and harp.") The publication was endorsed by no less than Cristóbal Galán, maestro de capilla of the Convent of Las Descalzas Reales.

Later in life he held a post in Villafranca del Bierco, in the province of Leon.
