= Andrew Lawrence-King =

English harpist and conductor (born 1959)

Andrew Lawrence-King (born 3 September 1959) is a harpist and conductor from Guernsey known for his work in early music.

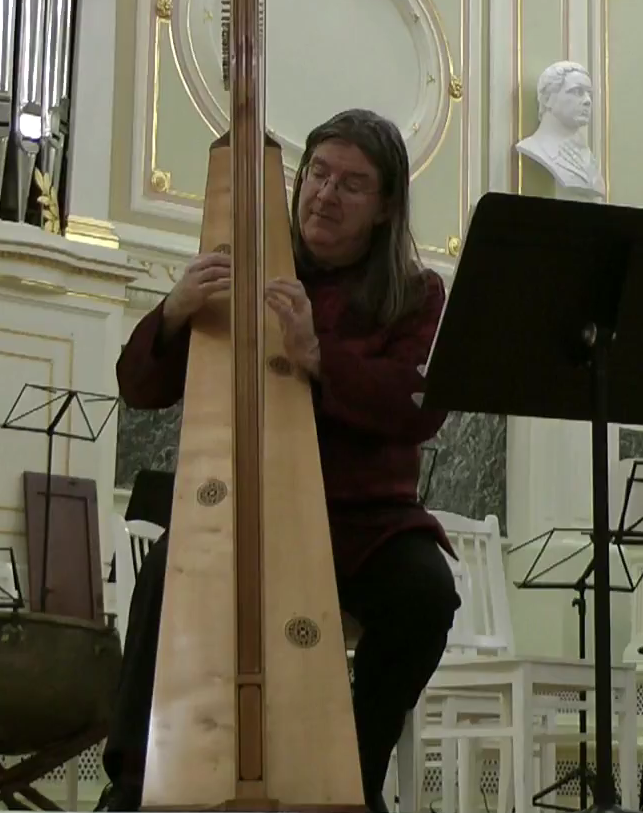

== Career ==
Lawrence-King received an organ scholarship to Selwyn College, Cambridge, following on his work as head chorister at the Cathedral and Parish Church of St Peter Port Guernsey. Lawrence-King taught himself the techniques of early harp performance after acquiring an early harp, emphasizing a heavily improvisational style. After Selwyn, he attended the London Early Music Centre, subsequently becoming an ensemble continuo player with various groups in Europe and a harp soloist with Hespèrion XX. In addition to his work with other ensembles, Lawrence-King founded continuo group Tragicomedia which he co-directed with Stephen Stubbs from 1988 to 1994, the year he founded The Harp Consort, which performs internationally and releases recordings on Harmonia Mundi.

Lawrence-King has worked as a conductor with a number of ensembles, including conducting at the 400th anniversary of the earliest opera at the Getty Center in Los Angeles (2001). He has served as senior visiting research fellow for the Australian Research Council Centre of Excellence for the History of Emotions, studying baroque opera performance customs of the 17th century alongside professor Jane Davidson of the University of Western Australia and as professor of harp and continuo at the Akademie für Alte Musik in Bremen.

== Awards and honors ==
In 1992, he received the Erwin Bodky Award from the Cambridge Society for Early Music in Massachusetts. In 1996, his recording of Alcina brought him the American Handel Society Prize.

== Discography ==
- A Baroque Festival. Music by Handel, Purcell, Pachelbel, J.S. Bach. As one of the Taverner Players, with Elizabeth Wallfisch (violin) and Jakob Lindberg (archlute), and the Taverner Consort (SATB: Emily Van Evera, Caroline Trevor, Rufus Miller, Simon Grant), directed by Andrew Parrott. Veritas Virgin Edition 7243-5-61304-2-5 (1996), originally EMI (1988).
- La Harpe Royale: Musical portraits, dances, and laments from the court of Louis XIV. Deutsche Harmonia Mundi 05472 77371 2.
- His Majesty's Harper, historical harps (Italian arpa doppia, Irish cláirseach). Deutsche Harmonia Mundi 05472 77504 2 (CD, 1999)
- Bitter Ballads: Poetry set to medieval melodies. With Paul Hillier. HMU 908204.
- Distant Love: Songs of Jaufré Rudel and Martin Codax. HMU 907203.
- Il Zazzerino: Music of Jacopo Peri. HMU 907234.
- ¡Jacaras!: Guitar music of Santiago de Murcia. HMU 907212.
- Pavaniglia: Dances & madrigals from 17th century Italy. HMU 907246.
- English Country Dances: 17th century publications of John Playford. HCX 3957186.
- French Troubadour Songs. HCX 3957184.
- Italian Renaissance Dances volume 1. HCX 3957159.
- See also The Harp Consort.
