= 1697 =

1697 in various calendars
- Gregorian calendar: 1697; MDCXCVII
- Ab urbe condita: 2450
- Armenian calendar: 1146; ԹՎ ՌՃԽԶ
- Assyrian calendar: 6447
- Balinese saka calendar: 1618–1619
- Bengali calendar: 1103–1104
- Berber calendar: 2647
- English Regnal year: 9 Will. 3 – 10 Will. 3
- Buddhist calendar: 2241
- Burmese calendar: 1059
- Byzantine calendar: 7205–7206
- Chinese calendar: 丙子年 (Fire Rat); 4394 or 4187 — to — 丁丑年 (Fire Ox); 4395 or 4188
- Coptic calendar: 1413–1414
- Discordian calendar: 2863
- Ethiopian calendar: 1689–1690
- Hebrew calendar: 5457–5458
- Hindu calendars
- Vikram Samvat: 1753–1754
- Shaka Samvat: 1618–1619
- Kali Yuga: 4797–4798
- Holocene calendar: 11697
- Igbo calendar: 697–698
- Iranian calendar: 1075–1076
- Islamic calendar: 1108–1109
- Japanese calendar: Genroku 10 (元禄１０年)
- Javanese calendar: 1620–1621
- Julian calendar: Gregorian minus 10 days
- Korean calendar: 4030
- Minguo calendar: 215 before ROC 民前215年
- Nanakshahi calendar: 229
- Thai solar calendar: 2239–2240
- Tibetan calendar: མེ་ཕོ་བྱི་བ་ལོ་ (male Fire-Rat); 1823 or 1442 or 670 — to — མེ་མོ་གླང་ལོ་ (female Fire-Ox); 1824 or 1443 or 671

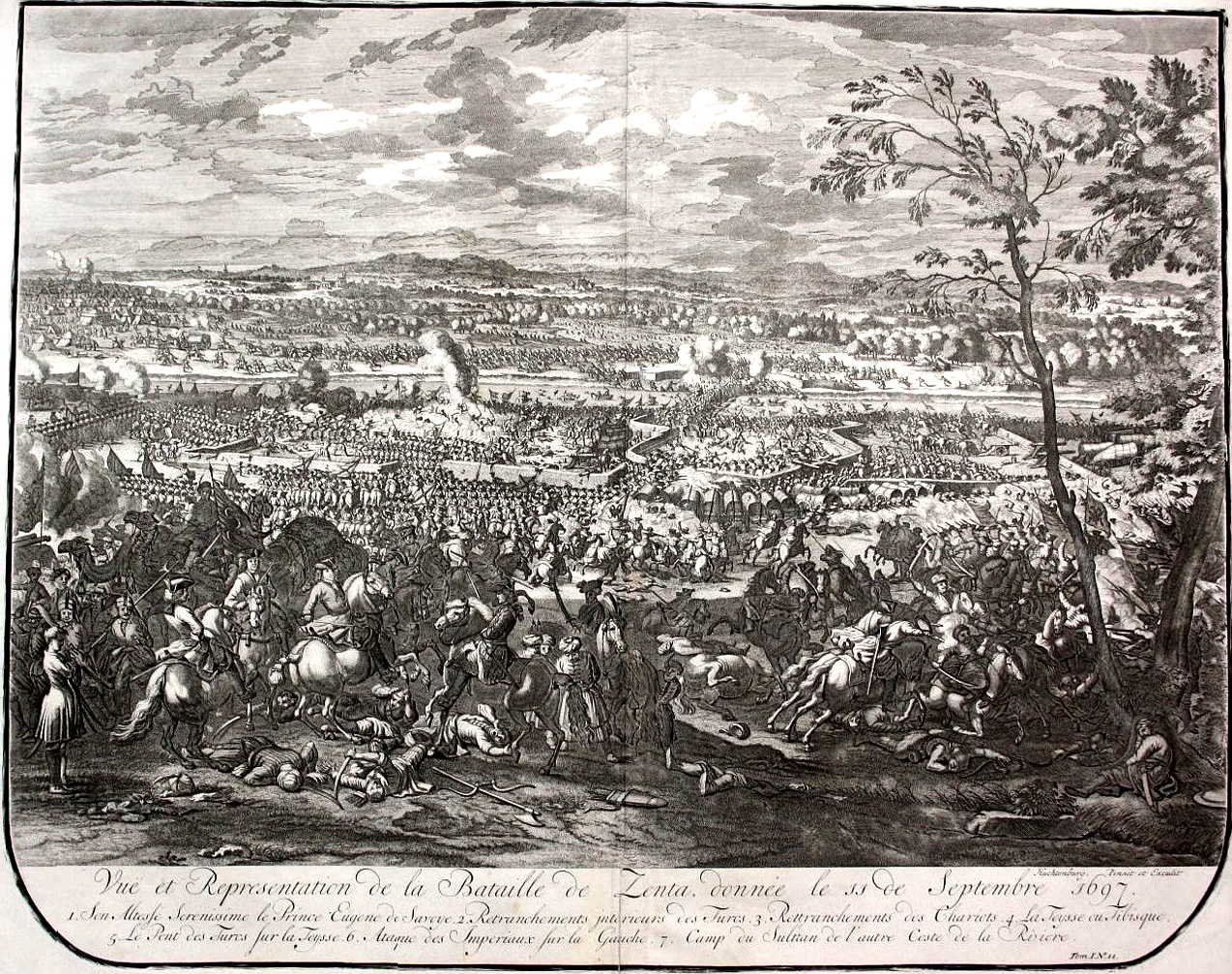
September 11: The Prince of Savoy defeats the Ottoman Empire's final attack on Hungary at the Battle of Zenta.

1697 (MDCXCVII) was a common year starting on Tuesday of the Gregorian calendar and a common year starting on Friday of the Julian calendar, the 1697th year of the Common Era (CE) and Anno Domini (AD) designations, the 697th year of the 2nd millennium, the 97th year of the 17th century, and the 8th year of the 1690s decade. As of the start of 1697, the Gregorian calendar was 10 days ahead of the Julian calendar, which remained in localized use until 1923.

== Events ==
=== January–March ===
- January 8 – Thomas Aikenhead is hanged outside Edinburgh, becoming the last person in Great Britain to be executed for blasphemy.
- January 11 – French writer Charles Perrault releases the book Histoires ou contes du temps passé (literally "Tales of Past Times", known in England as "Mother Goose tales") in Paris, a collection of popular fairy tales, including Cinderella, Puss in Boots, Red Riding Hood, The Sleeping Beauty and Bluebeard.
- February 22 – Gerrit de Heere becomes the new Governor of Dutch Ceylon, succeeding Thomas van Rhee and administering the colony for almost six years until his death.
- February 26 – Conquistador Martín de Ursúa y Arizmendi and 114 soldiers arrive at Lake Petén Itzá in what is now Guatemala and begin the Spanish conquest of Guatemala with an attack on the capital of the Itza people there before moving northward to the Yucatan peninsula.
- March 9 – Grand Embassy of Peter the Great: Tsar Peter the Great of Russia sets out to travel in Europe incognito, as Artilleryman Pjotr Mikhailov.
- March 13 – The Spanish conquest of Petén, and of Yucatán, is completed with the fall of Nojpetén, capital of the Itza Maya Kingdom, the last independent Maya state.
- March 22 – Charles II of Spain issues a Royal Cedula extending to the indigenous nobles of the Spanish Crown colonies, as well as to their descendants, the preeminence and honors customarily attributed to the Hidalgos of Castile.
- March 26 – Safavid occupation of Basra: Safavid government troops take control of Basra.

=== April–June ===
- April 5 – Charles XII becomes king of Sweden at age 14 on the death of his father, Charles XI, from stomach cancer.
- April 23 – As Chinese troops from the Manchu Dynasty (ruled by the Kangxi Emperor) complete their conquest of Mongolia, Galdan Boshugtu Khan, ruler of the last part of Mongolia to be conquered, the Dzungar Khanate, poisons himself, ending the resistance to conquest.
- May 6 – General Bernard Desjean, Baron de Pointis of France carries out an attack and pillaging of the Spanish South American fort of Cartagena de Indias (now in Colombia) with 1,200 soldiers and 650 pirate mercenaries. The French attackers overwhelm the city for the next 18 days. The Baron reneges on a contract to share the wealth with the pirates, who will come back to Cartagena a second time and makes a more violent attack.
- May 17 (May 7 Old Style) – The 13th century royal Tre Kronor ("Three Crowns") castle in Stockholm burns to the ground, and a large portion of the royal library is destroyed.
- June 2 – Augustus, Elector of Saxony converts to Roman Catholicism in order to be eligible to rule Poland.
- June 10 – The last mass execution for witchcraft in western Europe when the five Paisley witches are hanged and then burned in Scotland.
- June 27 – After becoming a Roman Catholic, Augustus the Strong is elected King Augustus II of Poland.
- June 30 – The earliest reported first-class cricket match takes place in Sussex in England.

=== July–September ===
- July 4 – A Byzantine icon, the "Weeping Madonna of Pócs", arrives in Vienna after a five-month journey following its forced removal from the Hungarian village of Pócs by order of the Holy Roman Emperor, Leopold I. It has been housed for more than 320 years in St. Stephen's Cathedral.
- July 6 – A major naval battle takes place between the Republic of Venice and the Ottoman Empire with each side having 25 battleships, supplemented by smaller vessels. The Venetian Navy, under the command of Admiral Bartolomeo Contarini, suffers 71 deaths and 163 injuries, and even worse casualties in a second engagement on September 20.
- July 27 – Mahmud Shah II, the Sultan of Johor and Pahang (now part of Malaysia) takes on full power upon the death of the regent, the Bendahara Paduka Raja. Mahmud II was only 10 years old when he became the Sultan upon the assassination of his father, Ibrahim Shah in 1685.
- July 28 – The opera Vénus et Adonis, composed by Henri Desmarets with libretto by Jean-Baptiste Rousseau, receives its first performance, premiering at the Théâtre du Palais-Royal in Paris.
- August 10 – The Siege of Barcelona ends in Spain after 52 days as Louis Joseph, Duke of Vendôme of France obtains the surrender of Barcelona from the Austrian General, Prince George of Hesse-Darmstadt.
- September 5 (August 25 O.S.) – During the Nine Years' War, the Battle of Hudson's Bay is fought between English and French ships in Hudson Bay near what is now the Canadian province of Manitoba; The French warship Pélican captures York Factory, a trading post of the English Hudson's Bay Company.
- September 11 – Battle of Zenta: Prince Eugene of Savoy crushes the Ottoman army of Mustafa II, and effectively ends Turkish hopes of recovering lost ground in Hungary.
- September 17 – Amcazade Köprülü Hüseyin Pasha becomes the new Grand Vizier of the Ottoman Empire in the wake of the disastrous Ottoman defeat at Zenta, replacing Grand Vizier Elmas Mehmed Pasha, who was killed in the battle by his own troops.
- September 20 – The Treaty of Ryswick is signed by France and the Grand Alliance, to end both the Nine Years' War and King William's War. Louis XIV of France recognises William III as King of England & Scotland, and both sides return territories they have taken in battle. In North America, the treaty returns Port-Royal (Acadia) to France.

=== October–December ===
- October 7 – The opera Issé, composed by André Cardinal Destouches with libretto by Antoine Houdar de la Motte, premieres at the Palace of Fontainebleau in France.
- October 16 – The Norwegian Code, promulgated by King Christian V of Denmark-Norway in 1687, is amended to provide for torture of condemned criminals in certain capital offenses in Norway, with permission for burning with hot irons, or cutting off the prisoner's right hand while the prisoner is being transported for decapitation.
- October 19 – Misión Loreto, the first Roman Catholic mission on Mexico's Baja California Peninsula, is founded by Spanish missionary Juan María de Salvatierra.
- October 24 – The first opéra-ballet, combining elements of both mediums of entertainment, is performed as L'Europe galante makes its debut at the Salle du Palais-Royal in Paris. Composed by André Campra, with libretto by Antoine Houdar de la Motte, the opera and ballet is conducted by Marin Marais.
- October 30 – The Nine Years' War, between France and the Grand Alliance comes to an end with the signing of the last pacts of the Peace of Ryswick in the Dutch city of Rijswijk as Leopold I of Austria accedes two days before a deadline that had been set by the other members of the Grand Alliance. The areas of the Duchy of Lorraine (Lotharingen), Freiburg im Breisgau, and Vieux-Brisach (Breisach) are returned by France to Leopold's control.
- November 24 – The elaborate burial of the late King Charles XI of Sweden takes place more than seven months after his April 5 death, with interment at the Riddarholmen Church on the island of Riddarholmen near Stockholm.
- November 30 – Prince Eugene of Savoy, a field marshal within the Holy Roman Empire, purchases a large tract of land in Vienna for construction of the Belvedere Palace.
- December 2 – The first service is held in St Paul's Cathedral since rebuilding work after the Great Fire of London began.
- December 7 – Louis, Duke of Burgundy, and Marie Adélaïde of Savoy marry in the royal chapel at the Palace of Versailles in France.
- December 8 – Tsangyang Gyatso is installed in Tibet as the 6th Dalai Lama in a ceremony at Lhasa, filling a vacancy that had existed since 1682.
- December 11 – A ball in the Hall of Mirrors at the Palace of Versailles is held to celebrate the Duke of Burgundy and Marie Adélaïde's wedding.
- December 14 – The coronation ceremony takes place for King Charles XII of Sweden.

=== Date unknown ===
- The Manchus of the Qing dynasty conquer Outer Mongolia.
- The Parliament of England passes the Trade with Africa Act 1697 (An Act to settle the Trade to Africa), which end the Royal African Company's monopoly on all English trade with Africa.
- William Dampier's A New Voyage Round the World is published in England.
- Christopher Polhem starts Sweden's first technical school.
- Heinrich Escher, Mayor of Zürich, introduces chocolate to Switzerland from Brussels.
- Martin Mere, England's largest lake, is drained by sir Thomas Fleetwood for farmland.
- The use of "litters" (wheelless transports that carried by four servants) increases in Europe.

=== Ongoing ===
- Great Famine of 1695–1697 in Scandinavia.
- Great Famine of Estonia (1695–97).
- "Seven ill years" of famine in Scotland.

== Births ==
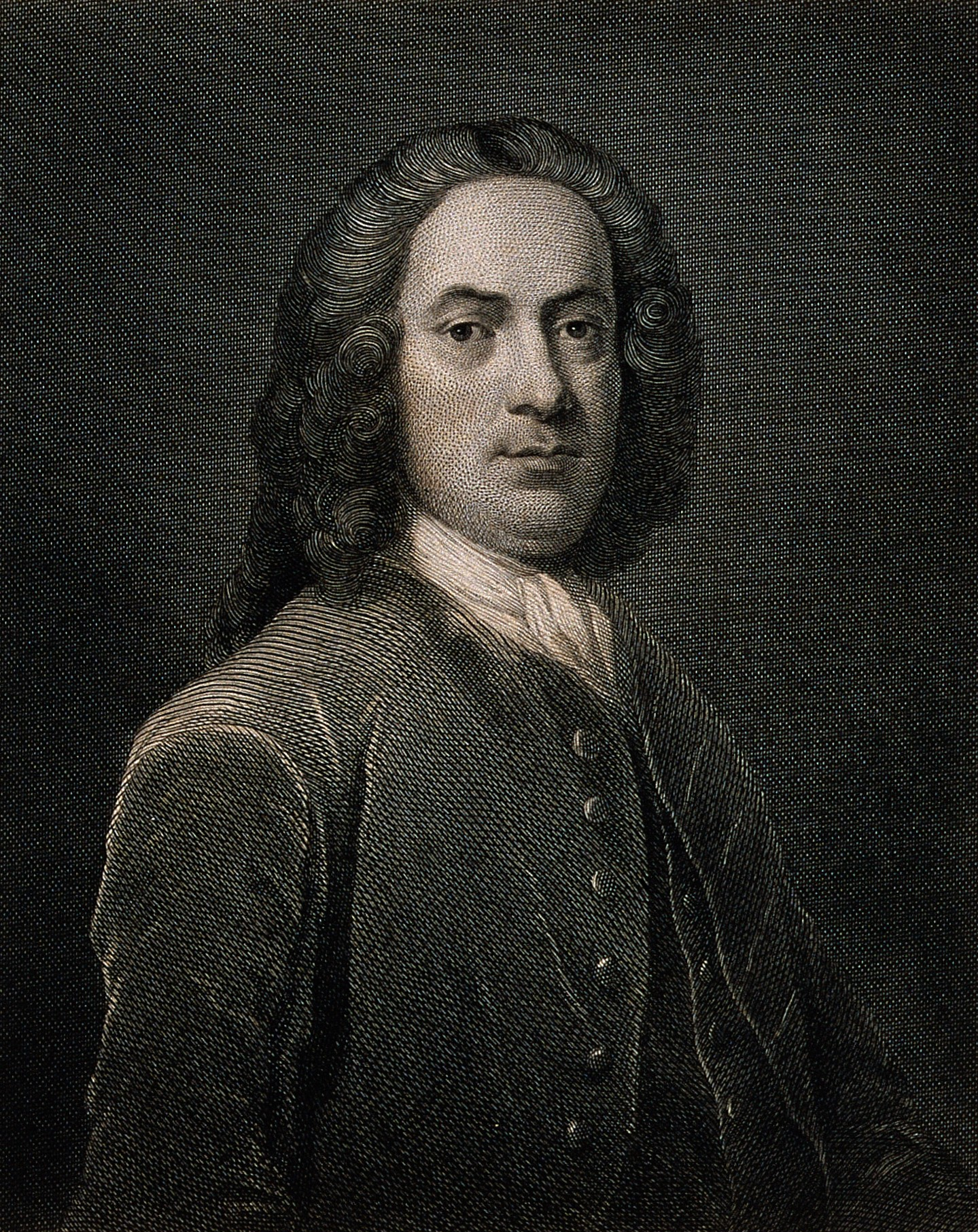
William Smellie (obstetrician) born 5 February

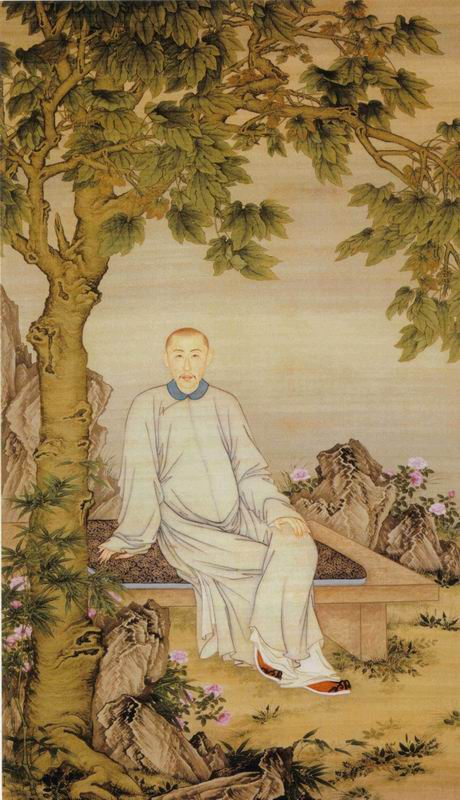
Yunli born 24 March

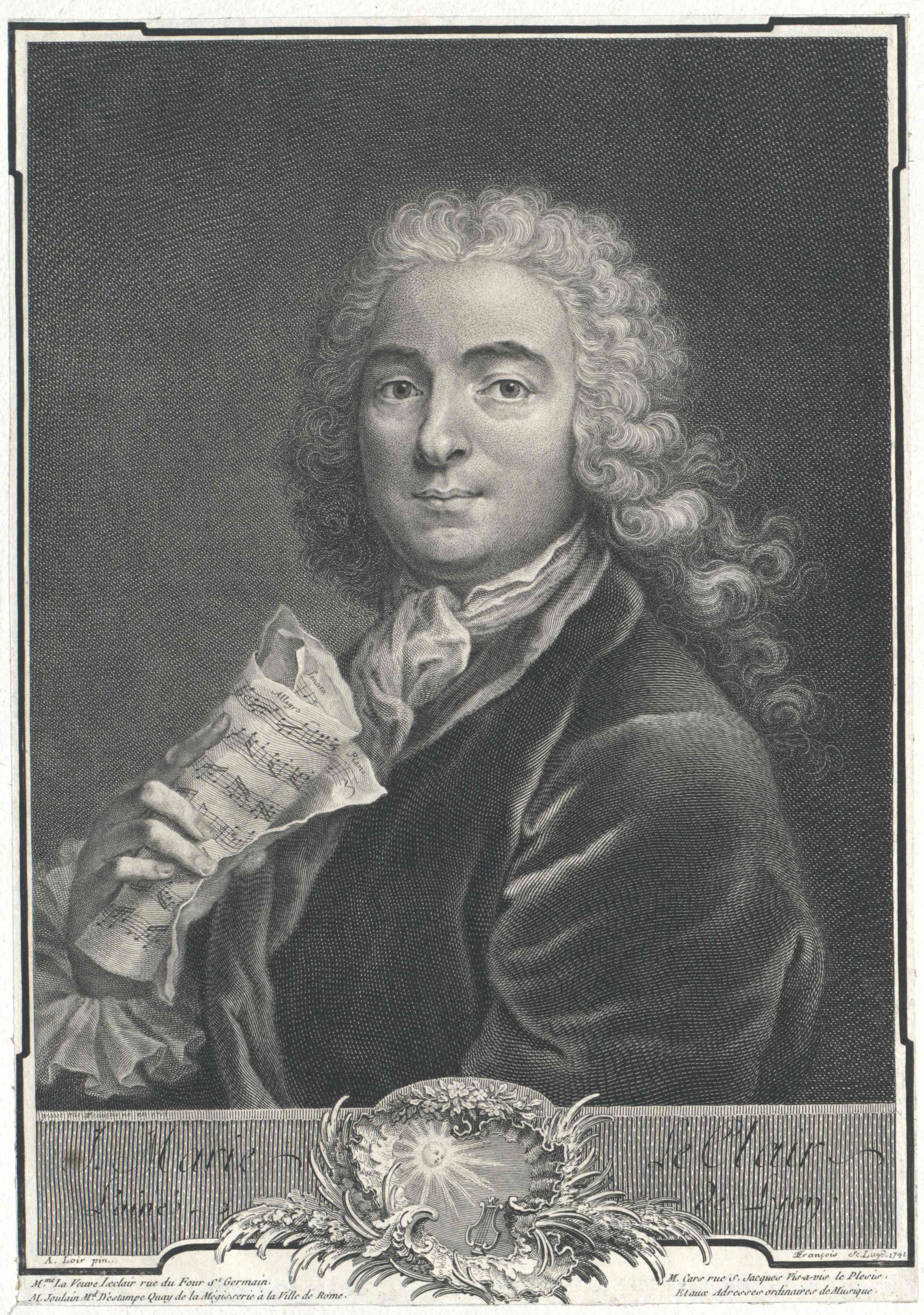
Jean-Marie Leclair born 10 May

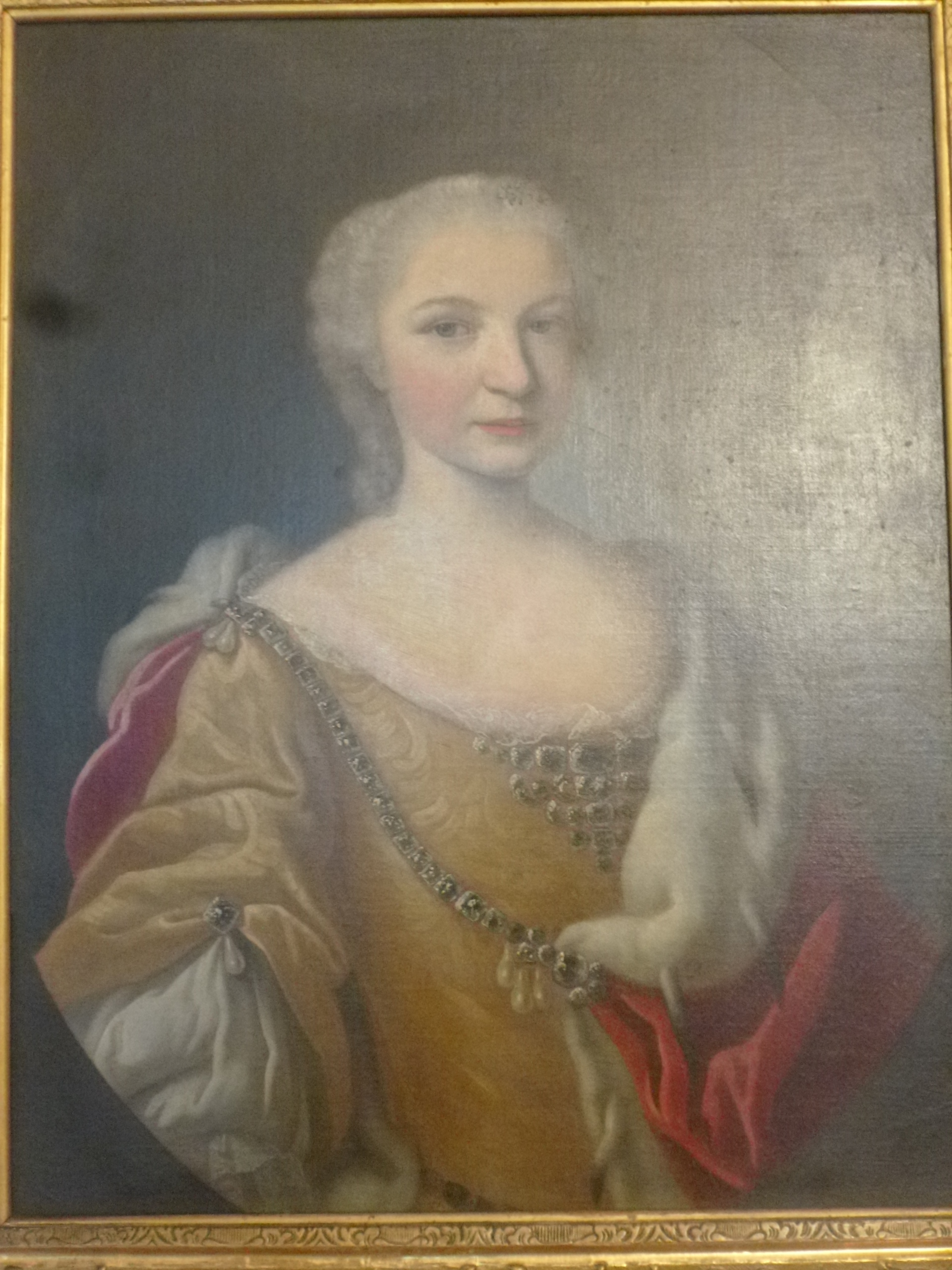
Countess Palatine Ernestine of Sulzbach born 15 May

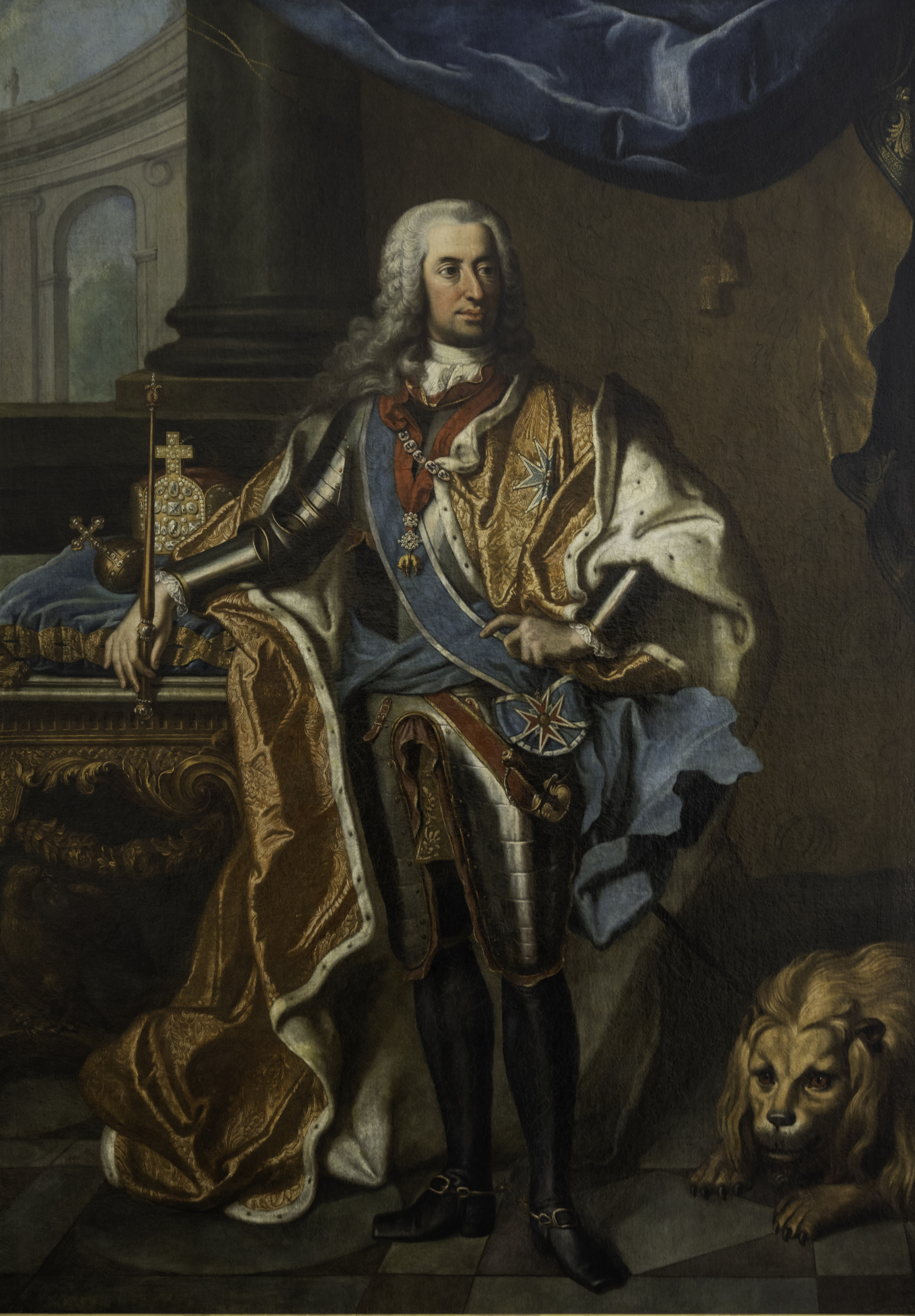
Charles VII, Holy Roman Emperor born 6 August

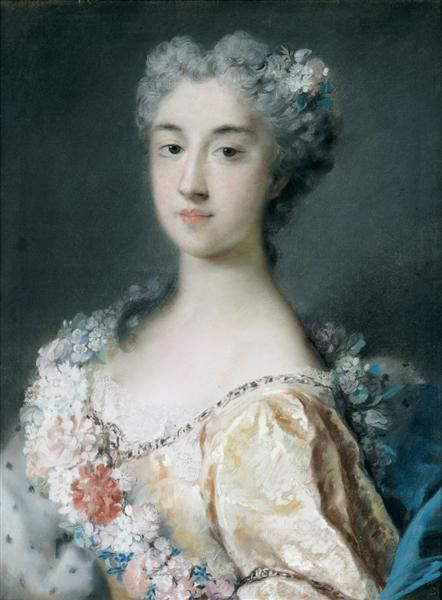
Princess Benedetta d'Este born 18 August

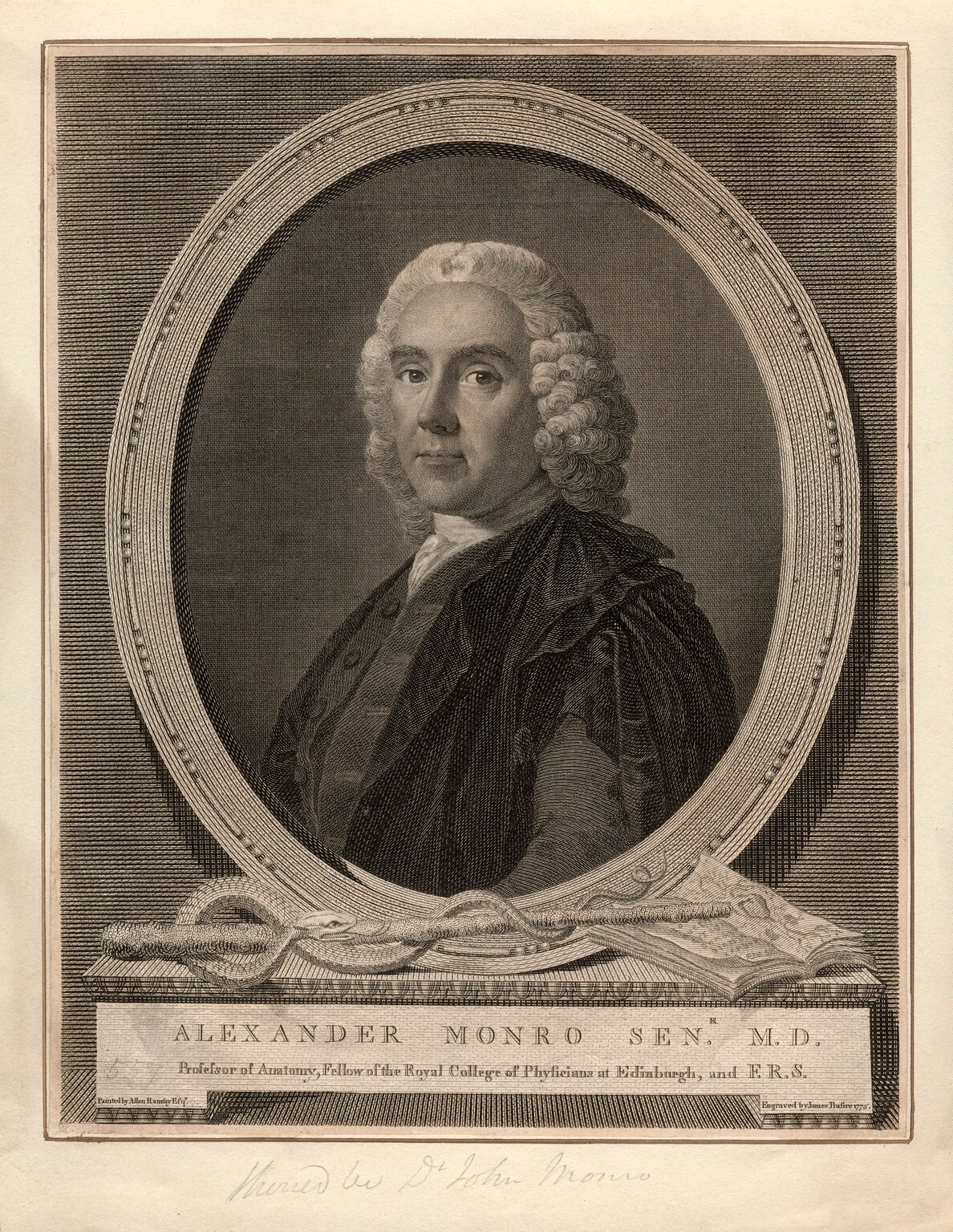
Alexander Monro (primus) born 19 September

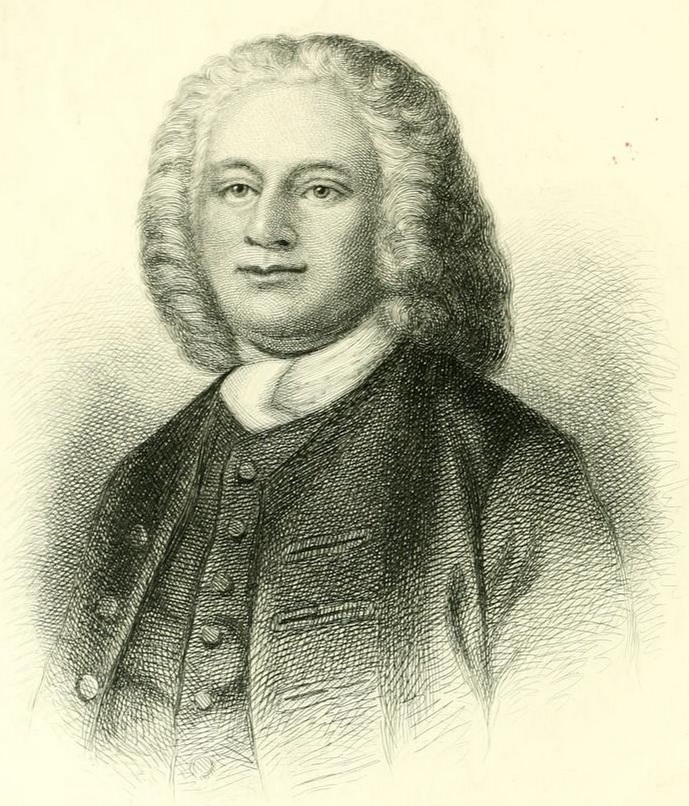
William Smith (judge, born 1697) born 8 October

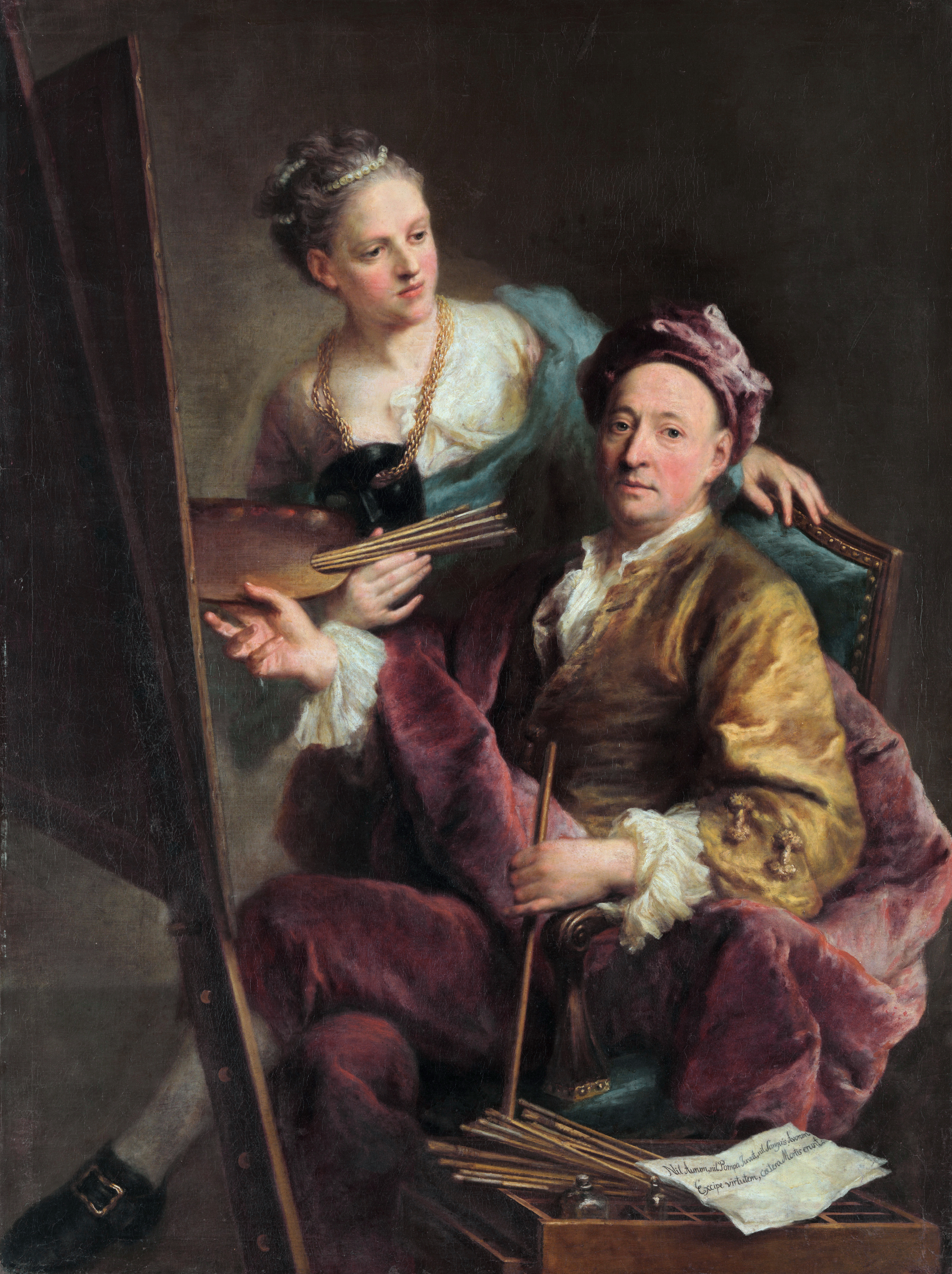
Georg Desmarées born 29 October

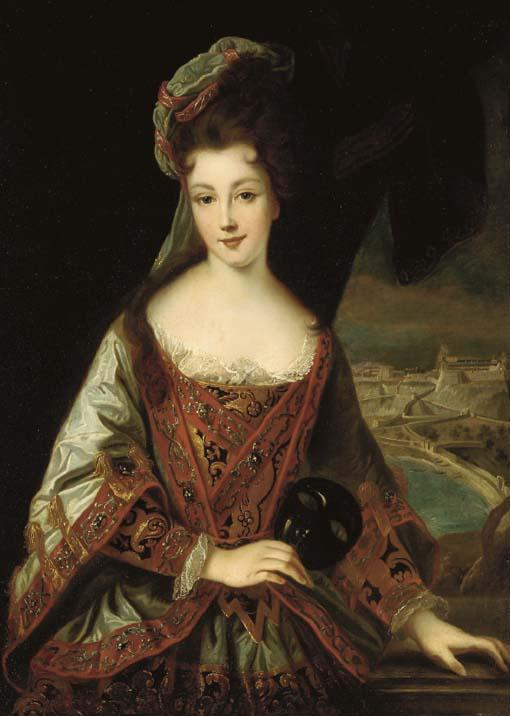
Louise Hippolyte, Princess of Monaco born 10 November

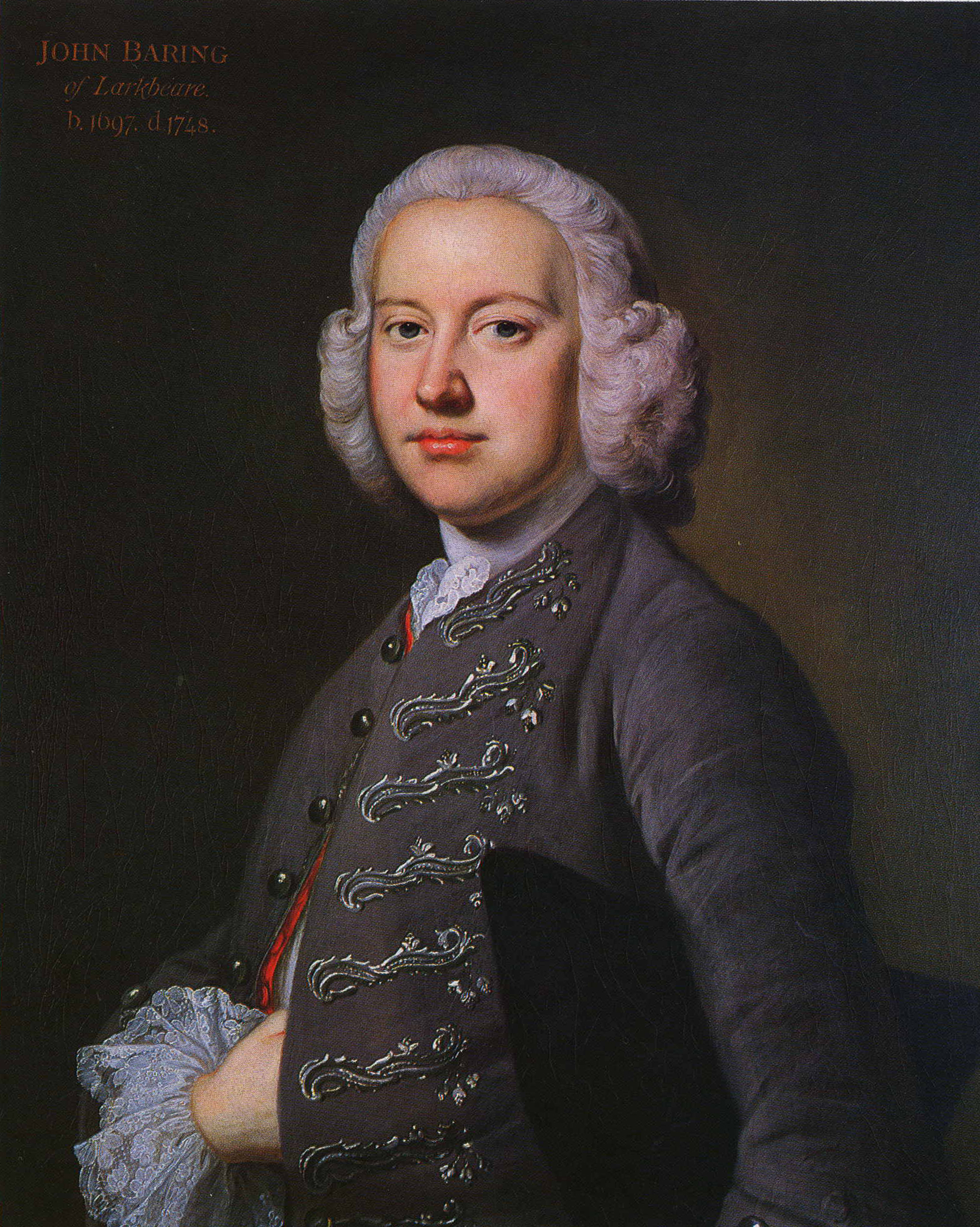
Johann Baring born 15 November

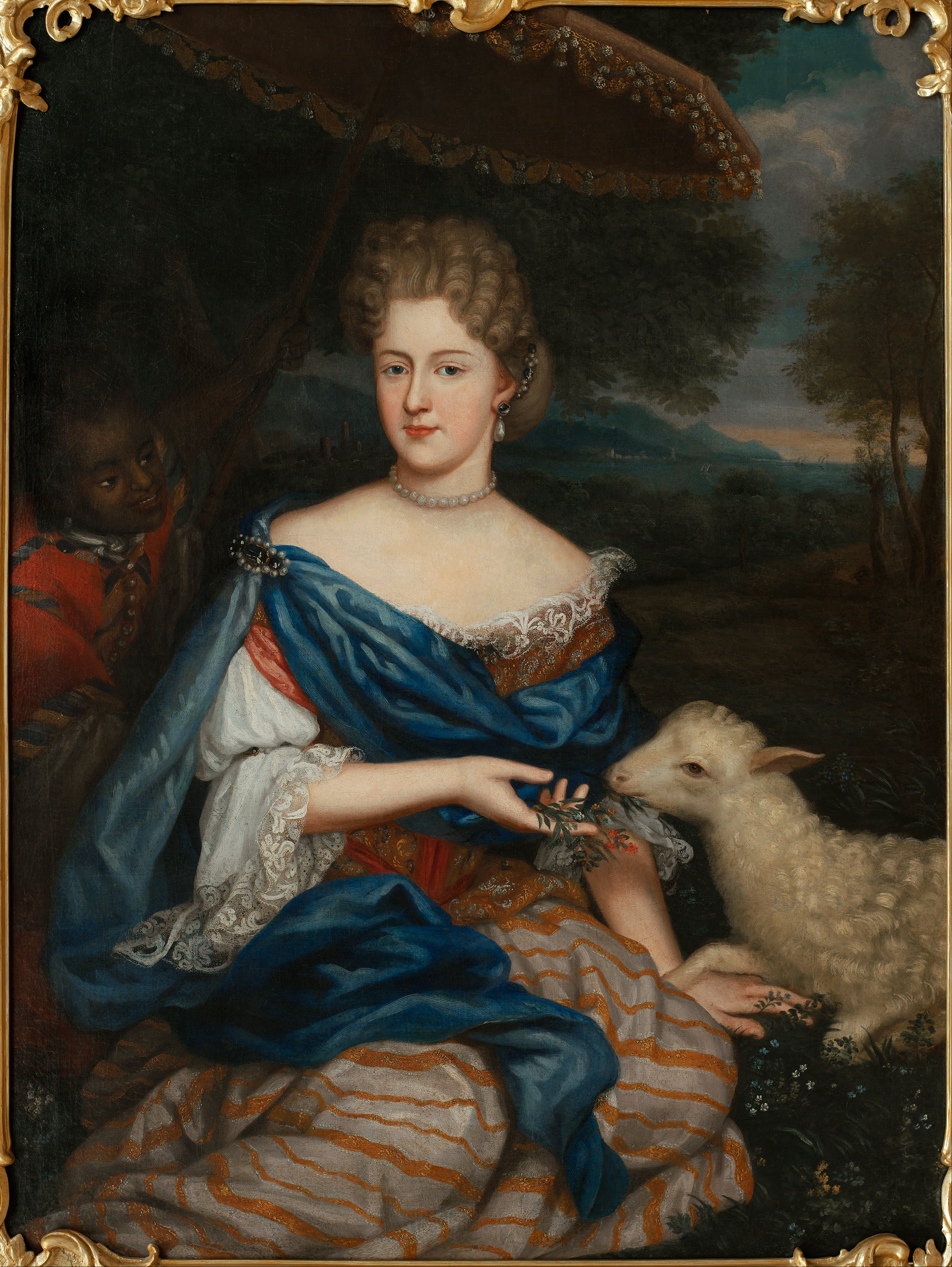
Maria Karolina Sobieska born 25 November

=== January–March ===
- January 1 – Johann Pfeiffer, German violinist (d. 1761)
- January 7
  - Wilhelm August von der Osten, Danish civil servant (d. 1764)
  - Robert Wallace, minister of the Church of Scotland, writer on population (d. 1771)
- January 9 – Gabriel Hanger, 1st Baron Coleraine, English politician (d. 1773)
- January 11 – William Capell, 3rd Earl of Essex, English courtier and diplomat (d. 1743)
- January 13 – Paul-François de Galluccio, marquis de L'Hôpital, French nobleman and ambassador to Russia (d. 1767)
- January 16 – Jules, Prince of Soubise, French nobleman and Prince of Soubise (d. 1724)
- January 17 – Franz Neumayr, German Jesuit preacher (d. 1765)
- January 19 – Thérèse de Couagne, capitalist and slave owner who played an active role in the economy of New France (d. 1764)
- January 22 – Antoine-Martin Chaumont de La Galaizière, French nobleman (d. 1783)
- January 23 – Joseph François Dupleix, Governor-General of French India and rival of Robert Clive (d. 1763)
- January 26 – Sir Hugh Acland, 6th Baronet, British landowner, politician and MP (d. 1728)
- January 30 – Johann Joachim Quantz, German flautist and composer (d. 1773)
- February 1 – Josse Boutmy, composer, organist and harpsichordist of the Austrian Netherlands (d. 1779)
- February 4 – James Franklin, American colonial author (d. 1735)
- February 5 – William Smellie, Scottish obstetrician and medical instructor (d. 1763)
- February 9 – Sir James Johnstone, 3rd Baronet, Scottish baronet and politician (d. 1772)
- February 13 – Knud Leem, Norwegian priest and linguist (d. 1774)
- February 15 – Vito Maria Amico, Italian monk (d. 1752)
- February 24 – Bernhard Siegfried Albinus, German anatomist (d. 1770)
- February 26
  - Giuseppe Pedretti, Italian painter (d. 1778)
  - Edward Thompson, prominent Yorkshire politician (d. 1742)
- February 28
  - Caio Domenico Gallo, Italian historian (d. 1780)
  - Agustín de Montiano y Luyando, Spanish dramatist whose work is linked to Neoclassicism (d. 1764)
- March 6 – Jacques Deschamps, French theologian and priest (d. 1759)
- March 9 – Friederike Caroline Neuber, German actress and theatre director (d. 1760)
- March 12 – Joseph Leblanc dit Le Maigre, Acadian farmer and trader (d. 1772)
- March 20 – József Dravecz, Slovene Roman Catholic priest (d. 1779)
- March 21 – Christian Gottlieb Priber, German immigrant with legal training who emigrated to the British Colonies of North America (d. 1744)
- March 24
  - Louis Constantin de Rohan, French prelate of the House of Rohan (d. 1779)
  - Yunli, Manchu prince of the Qing dynasty (d. 1738)
- March 30
  - Faustina Bordoni, Italian mezzo-soprano (d. 1781)
  - Jan Baptist Xavery, Flemish sculptor principally active in the Dutch Republic (d. 1742)

=== April–June ===
- April 2
  - Gaetano Casanova, Italian actor and ballet dancer (d. 1733)
  - Sauveur François Morand, French surgeon (d. 1773)
- April 12 – Anton Pichler, Tyrolean goldsmith and artist of engraved gems (d. 1779)
- April 16 – Johann Gottlieb Görner, German composer and organist (d. 1778)
- April 23 – George Anson, 1st Baron Anson, British admiral (d. 1762)
- April 26 – Adam Falckenhagen, German lutenist and composer (d. 1754)
- May 2 – Michael Fabritius, Danish merchant (d. 1746)
- May 5 – Henricus Boelen, American silversmith in New York City (d. 1755)
- May 10 – Jean-Marie Leclair, French violinist (d. 1764)
- May 15 – Countess Palatine Ernestine of Sulzbach, wife of Landgrave William II (d. 1775)
- May 16 – John Berkeley, 5th Baron Berkeley of Stratton, British politician (d. 1773)
- May 20 – Francesco Scipione Maria Borghese, Italian cardinal from the Borghese family (d. 1759)
- May 28 – Frederick Bernard, Count Palatine of Gelnhausen (d. 1739)
- June 2 – Thomas Whincop, English compiler of theatrical history (d. 1730)
- June 4 – Jacob Emden, German rabbi and talmudist who championed Orthodox Judaism (d. 1776)
- June 9 – Augustus Louis, Prince of Anhalt-Köthen, German prince of the House of Ascania (d. 1755)
- June 10 – Johann Caspar Barthel, German canon lawyer (d. 1771)
- June 11 – Francesco Antonio Vallotti, Italian composer (d. 1780)
- June 24 – Heinrich Joseph Johann of Auersperg, fourth Prince of Auersperg (d. 1783)

=== July–September ===
- July 27 – Isaac Maddox, Anglican clergyman (d. 1759)
- July 31 – Pietro Paolo Vasta, Italian painter (d. 1760)
- August 4 – Susanna Wright, colonial English American poet (d. 1784)
- August 6
  - Nicola Salvi, Italian architect (d. 1751)
  - Charles VII, Holy Roman Emperor from 1742 to 1745 (d. 1745)
- August 10 – Alexander Kurakin, statesman and diplomat (d. 1749)
- August 17 – Alexander Brodie, Scottish politician (d. 1754)
- August 18 – Princess Benedetta d'Este, noblewoman and princess of the Duchy of Modena and Reggio (d. 1777)
- August 19 – Richard Wingfield, 1st Viscount Powerscourt, Irish politician and peer (d. 1751)
- August 26 – Giovanni Battista Tagliasacchi, Italian painter of the late-Baroque period (d. 1737)
- August 28 – Armande de La Tour d'Auvergne, French noblewoman and Princess of Epinoy by marriage (d. 1717)
- August 30 – Henry Flitcroft, major English architect in the second generation of Palladianism (d. 1769)
- September 2 – Thomas Deacon, English non-juror bishop (d. 1753)
- September 6 – James Foster, English Baptist minister (d. 1753)
- September 16 – St George Caulfeild, Lord Chief Justice of Ireland (d. 1778)
- September 17 – John Gardner, American judge (d. 1764)
- September 18 – Cornelius Heinrich Dretzel, German organist and composer (bapt. 1697–1775) (d. 1775)
- September 19 – Alexander Monro, Scottish surgeon and anatomist (d. 1767)
- September 25 – Francis Josias, Duke of Saxe-Coburg-Saalfeld (d. 1764)
- September 27 – Franz Ernst Brückmann, German mineralogist born at Mariental (d. 1753)

=== October–December ===
- October 6 – Sir Robert Austen, 4th Baronet, British politician (d. 1743)
- October 8
  - Augustine Françoise de Choiseul, French aristocrat (d. 1728)
  - William Smith, American lawyer and jurist (d. 1769)
- October 9 – Pierre Philibert de Blancheton, French politician and music patron and collector (d. 1756)
- October 15 – Leopold Innocenty Nepomucen Polzer, Polish lawyer (d. 1753)
- October 16
  - Nicholas Amhurst, English poet and political writer (d. 1742)
  - Marie Anne de Bourbon, Superintendent of the Household to the French queen Marie Leszczyńska (d. 1741)
- October 18
  - Canaletto, Italian painter from the Republic of Venice (d. 1768)
  - Luigi Maria Torregiani, Italian Cardinal (d. 1777)
- October 19 – Claude-Pierre Goujet, French abbé and littérateur (d. 1767)
- October 22 – Mary Seymour, Duchess of Somerset (d. 1768)
- October 25 – Bartolomeo Ruspoli, Cardinal of the Roman Catholic Church (d. 1741)
- October 26 – John Peter Zenger, German printer and journalist in New York City (d. 1746)
- October 28 – Johann Gottfried Auerbach, Austrian painter and etcher (d. 1753)
- October 29 – Georg Desmarées, Swedish-born German portrait painter (d. 1776)
- October 31 – Johann Christian Fiedler, German portrait painter (d. 1765)
- November 2 – James Douglas, 3rd Marquess of Queensberry, Scottish noble (d. 1715)
- November 6 – Euseby Isham, English academic administrator at the University of Oxford (d. 1755)
- November 8 – Giovanni Lami, Italian jurist (d. 1770)
- November 9 – August Aleksander Czartoryski, member of the Polish nobility (Lang-pl (d. 1782)
- November 10
  - Louise Hippolyte, Princess of Monaco (d. 1731)
  - William Hogarth, English artist (d. 1764)
- November 13 – Lord William Manners, English nobleman, Whig politician and MP (d. 1772)
- November 15 – Johann Baring, German merchant (d. 1748)
- November 17 – René-Prosper Tassin, French historian (d. 1777)
- November 21 – Mateša Antun Kuhačević, Croatian poet and politician from Senj (d. 1772)
- November 23 – John Gill, English Baptist pastor (d. 1771)
- November 25
  - Maria Karolina Sobieska (d. 1740)
  - Gerhard Tersteegen, German Reformed religious writer and hymnist (d. 1769)
- November 30 – Johann Albrecht Korff, Russian diplomat (d. 1766)
- December 4 – Nicolas-Charles-Joseph Trublet, French churchman (canon of Saint-Malo) and moralist (d. 1770)
- December 6 – Carlo Arrigoni, Italian composer and musician active in several countries (d. 1744)
- December 7 – Peter August, Duke of Schleswig-Holstein-Sonderburg-Beck (d. 1775)
- December 11
  - Sakaki Hyakusen, Japanese painter in the nanga style (d. 1752)
  - Pyotr Saltykov (d. 1772)
- December 14 – Soloman Sprecher von Bernegg, Austrian military commander (d. 1758)
- December 18 – Marcantonio Dal Re, Italian engraver and publisher (d. 1766)
- December 21
  - Charles Bennet, 2nd Earl of Tankerville, British peer and politician (d. 1753)
  - Georg Erhard Hamberger, German professor of medicine (d. 1755)
- December 27 – Sollom Emlyn, Irish legal writer (d. 1754)

== Deaths ==
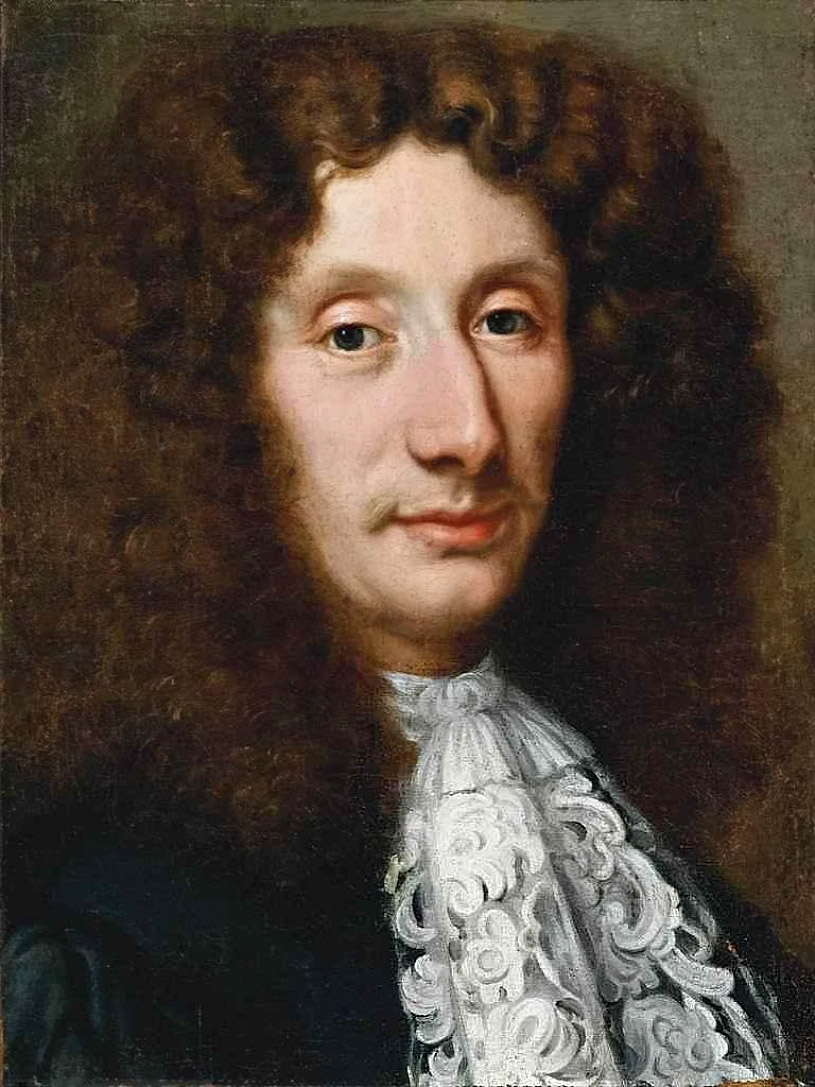
Francesco Redi died 1 March

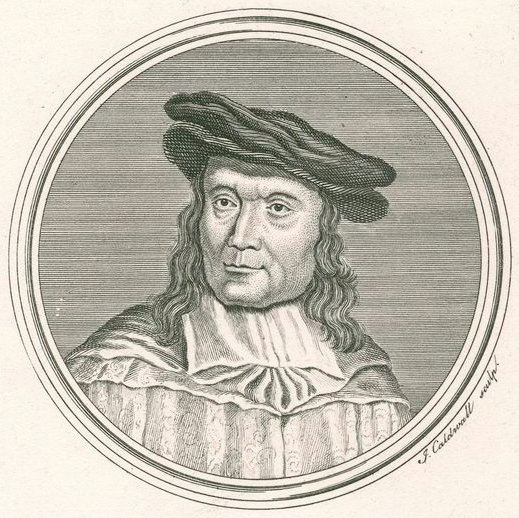
William Child died 23 March

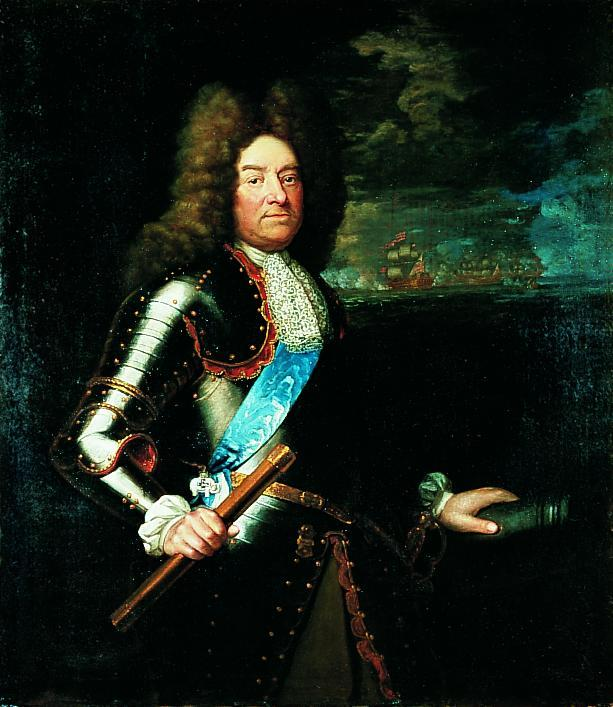
Niels Juel died 8 April

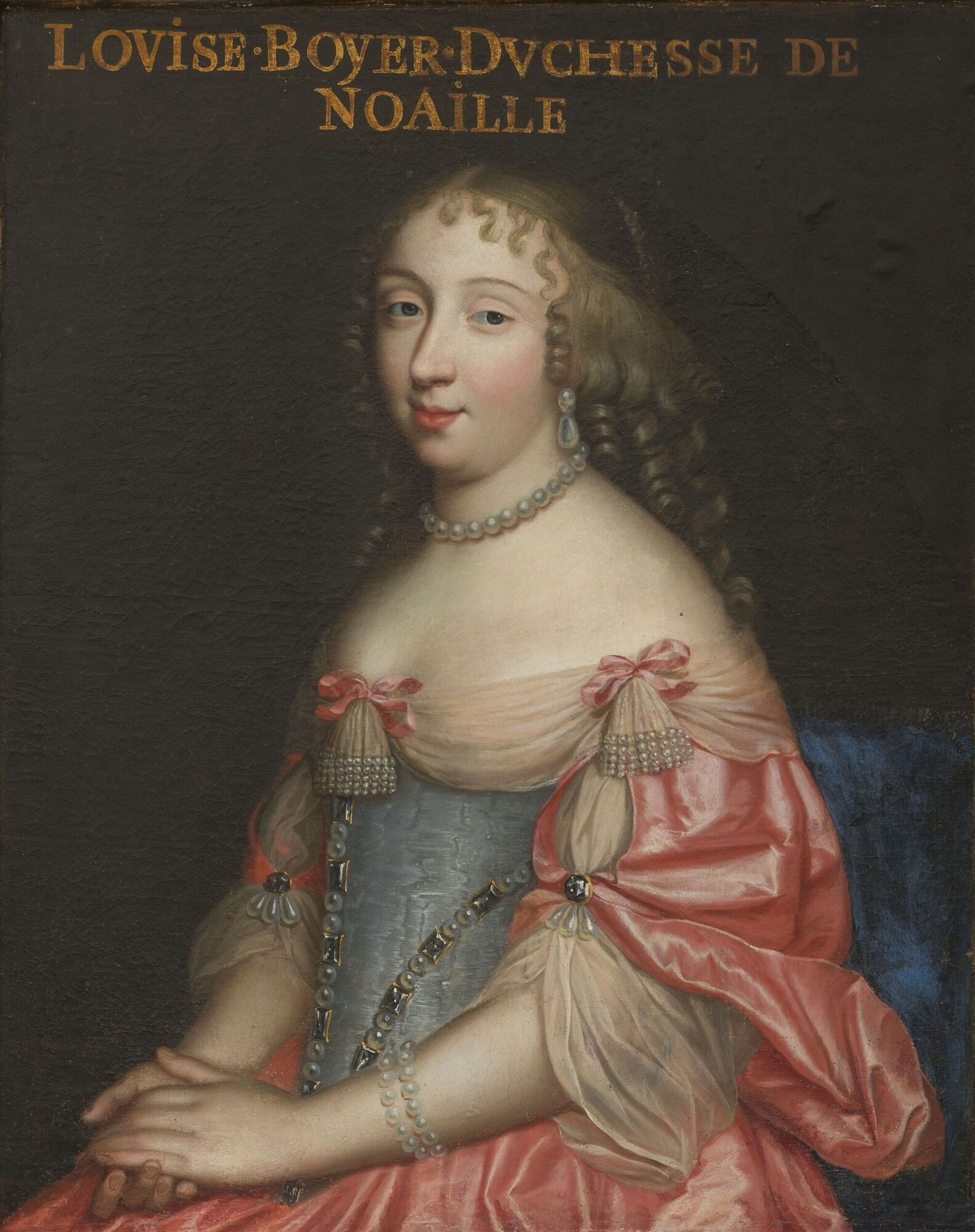
Louise Boyer died 22 May

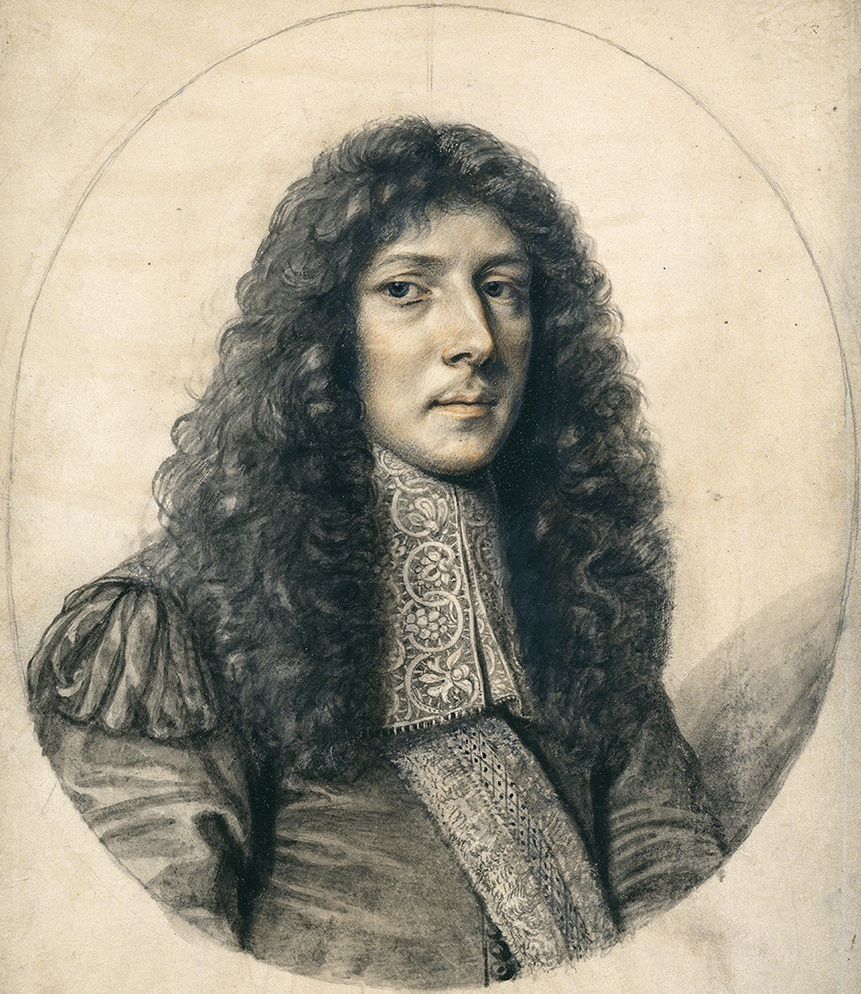
John Aubrey died 7 June

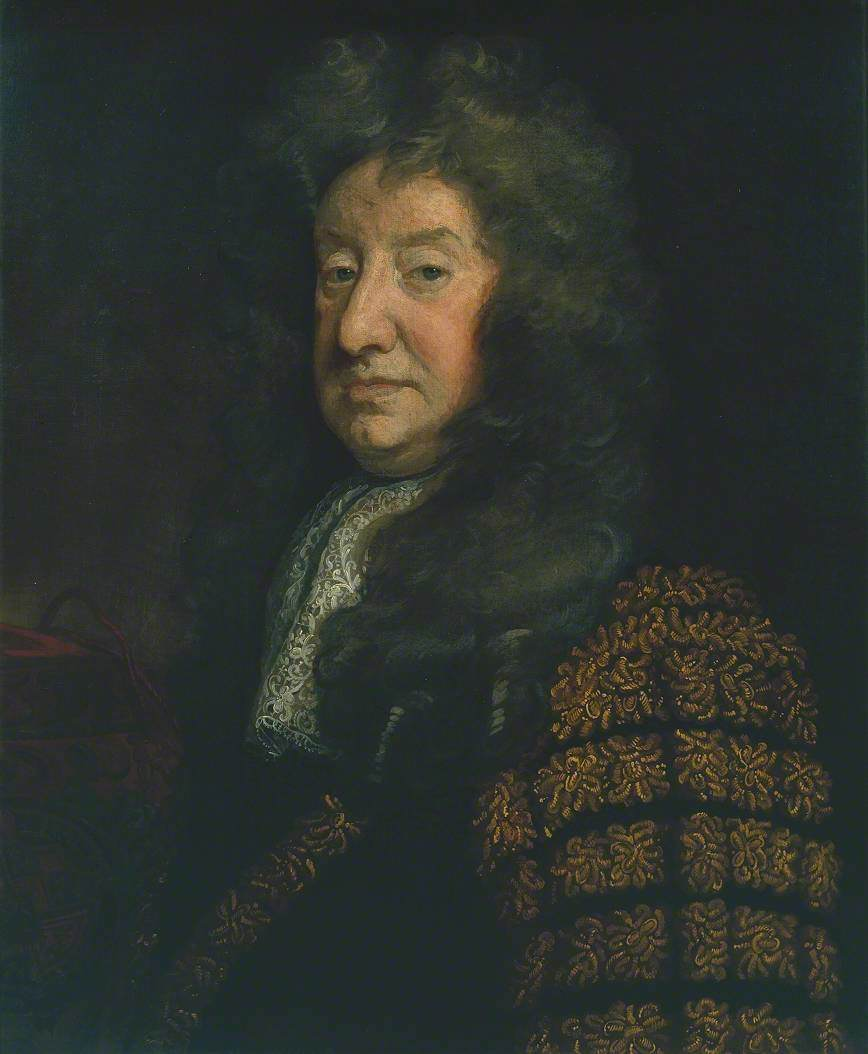
John Hay, 1st Marquess of Tweeddale died 11 August

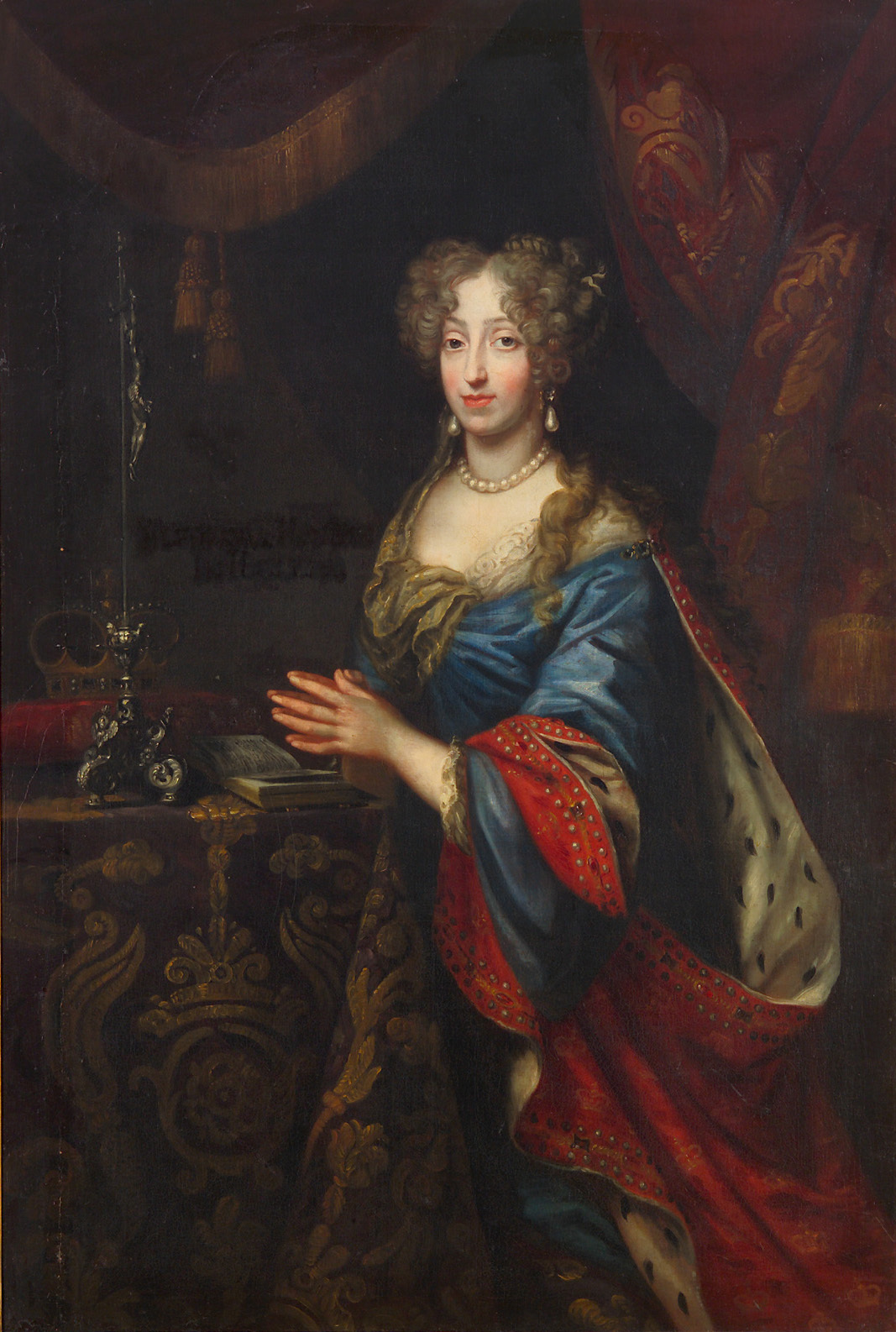
Eleonore of Austria, Queen of Poland died 17 December

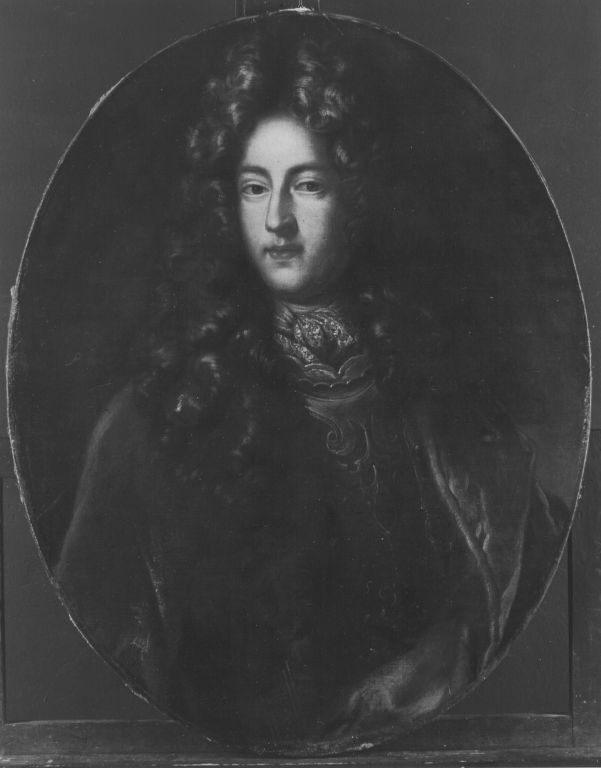
Frederick Charles, Duke of Württemberg-Winnental died 20 December

=== January–March ===
- February 16 – Jan Six van Chandelier, Dutch Golden Age poet from Amsterdam (b. 1620)
- March 15 – William Wentworth, follower of John Wheelwright (b. 1616)
- January 8 – Thomas Aikenhead, Scottish student (hanged) (b. c. 1678)
- January 11
  - John Bradstreet, accused "witch" during the Salem Witch Trials (b. 1652)
  - Daniele Giustiniani, Roman Catholic prelate, Bishop of Bergamo (1664–1697) (b. 1615)
- January 12 – Andrzej Stech, Polish painter (b. 1635)
- January 16 – Fortunato Ilario Carafa della Spina, Roman Catholic cardinal (b. 1630)
- January 26 – Georg Mohr, Danish mathematician (b. 1640)
- January 28 – John Fenwick, English conspirator (b. c. 1645)
- January 31 – Anthony Horneck, German clergyman and scholar (b. 1641)
- February 4 – Adrien de Wignacourt, 63rd Prince and Grand Master of the Order of Malta from 1690 to 1697 (b. 1618)
- February 5 – Esaias Fleischer, Danish priest (b. 1633)
- February 11 – Georg Händel, German musician (b. 1622)
- February 16 – Bernardino Plastina, Roman Catholic prelate, Bishop of Oppido Mamertina (b. 1645)
- February 17 – Francis Dane, American colonial priest (b. 1615)
- March 1 – Francesco Redi, Italian physician (b. 1626)
- March 12 – Gaspar de la Cerda, 8th Count of Galve, viceroy of New Spain (b. 1653)
- March 17 – Þórður Þorláksson, Icelandic bishop (b. 1637)
- March 19 – Nicolaus Bruhns, German organist and composer (b. 1665)
- March 23 – William Child, English composer and organist (b. 1606)
- March 26 – Godfrey McCulloch, Scottish politician and murderer (executed) (b. 1640)
- March 27 – Simon Bradstreet, English colonial magistrate (b. 1604)

=== April–June ===
- April 1 – Giyesu, Chinese prince (b. 1646)
- April 4 – Andrea Carlone, Italian painter (b. 1626)
- April 5 – King Charles XI of Sweden, King of Sweden from 1660 to 1697 (b. 1655)
- April 8 – Niels Juel, Danish admiral (b. 1629)
- April 14 – Custodio do Pinho, Roman Catholic prelate, Titular Bishop of Hierapolis in Isauria (b. 1638)
- May 2 – Simon Henry, Count of Lippe, ruling Count of Lippe-Detmold (b. 1639)
- May 8 – Sir Richard Temple, 3rd Baronet, English Member of Parliament (b. 1634)
- May 9 – Ildefonso Vargas y Abarca, Roman Catholic prelate, Bishop of Comayagua (b. 1633)
- May 12 – Francesco Maria Moles, Roman Catholic prelate, Bishop of Nola (b. 1638)
- May 22 – Louise Boyer, French courtier (b. 1632)
- May 24 – Johann Adolf I, Duke of Saxe-Weissenfels, German duke (b. 1649)
- June 3 – Silvius II Frederick, Duke of Württemberg-Oels (b. 1651)
- June 7 – John Aubrey, English writer and antiquarian (b. 1626)
- June 10 – Francis Pemberton, English judge, Lord Chief Justice of the King's Bench (b. 1624)
- June 12 – Ann Baynard, English natural philosopher (b. 1672)
- June 18 – Gregorio Barbarigo, Italian Catholic saint (b. 1625)
- June 19 – Henry Mordaunt, 2nd Earl of Peterborough, English diplomat (b. 1621)
- June 21 – Joseph Anthelmi, French ecclesiastical historian (b. 1648)

=== July–September ===
- July 5 – Sebastijan Glavinić, Catholic bishop (b. 1630)
- July 7 – John Eachard, English divine and satirist (b. 1636)
- July 10 – Katherine Ross, née Collace (c.1635–1697), memoirist and schoolmistress (b. 1635)
- July 11 – Frances Ward, 6th Baroness Dudley, English baroness (b. 1611)
- July 13 – James Draper, early settler of the Massachusetts Bay Colony (b. 1618)
- July 16 – Sir John Brownlow, 3rd Baronet, English politician (b. 1659)
- July 18
  - Thomas Dolman, English politician (b. 1622)
  - António Vieira, Portuguese writer (b. 1608)
- July 20 – Jan Kazimierz Denhoff, Polish cardinal from 1686 (b. 1649)
- July 24 – William Digges, politician in the Colony of Virginia, councillor in the Province of Maryland (b. 1651)
- July 25 – John Grout, military officer (b. 1643)
- July 27
  - Tun Habib Abdul Majid, Grand Vizier of Johor (b. 1637)
  - Dominik Mikołaj Radziwiłł, Polish–Lithuanian noble and politician (b. 1643)
- July 30 – Lorentz Mortensen Angell, Norwegian merchant and landowner (b. 1626)
- August 2
  - Giuseppe Bologna, Roman Catholic prelate, Archbishop of Capua, Archbishop of Benevento (b. 1634)
  - Sir William Frankland, 1st Baronet, English politician (b. 1640)
- August 5 – Jean-Baptiste de Santeul, French poet who wrote in Latin (b. 1630)
- August 11 – John Hay, 1st Marquess of Tweeddale, Scottish judge (b. 1625)
- August 30 – Daigo Fuyumoto, Japanese noble (b. 1648)
- September 11
  - Elmas Mehmed Pasha, Ottoman statesman, grand vizier from 1695 to 1697 (b. 1661)
  - Agneta Rosenbröijer, Finland Swedish noblewoman (b. 1620)

=== October–December ===
- October 27 – Takehara An'i, bureaucrat of Ryukyu Kingdom (b. 1651)
- October 30 – Thomas Lascelles, English politician (b. 1624)
- November 8 – Samuel Enys, English politician (b. 1611)
- November 22 – Libéral Bruant, French architect (b. c. 1635)
- November 30 – Thomas Crew, 2nd Baron Crew, English politician (b. 1624)
- December 17 – Eleonore of Austria, Queen of Poland (b. 1653)
  - Pietro Leoni, Roman Catholic prelate, Bishop of Verona, Bishop of Ceneda (b. 1637)
- December 20
  - Frederick Charles, Duke of Württemberg-Winnental (b. 1652)
  - Sir Arthur Gore, 1st Baronet, Irish politician (b. 1640)
- December 31 – Lucas Faydherbe, Belgian sculptor and architect (b. 1617)
- date unknown – Karin Thomasdotter, Finnish official (b. 1610)
