= Franz Ernst Brückmann =

German scientist

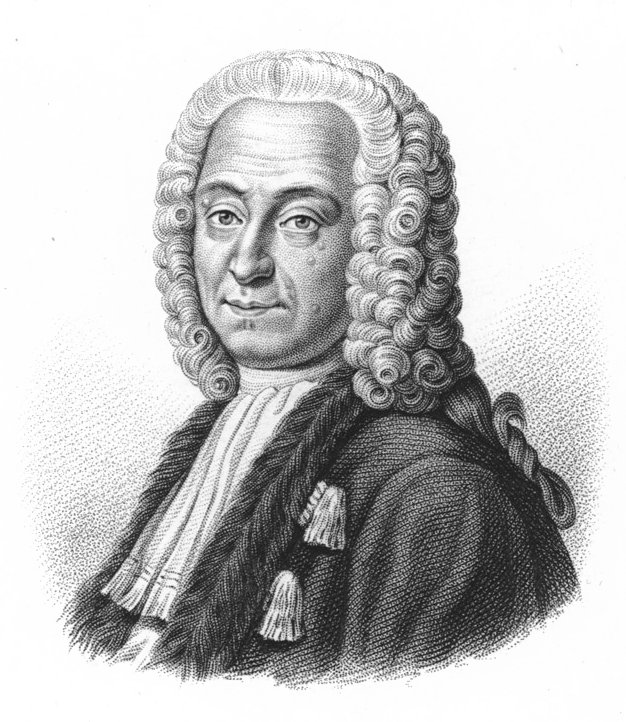
- Born: 27 September 1697; Marienthal
- Died: 21 March 1753 (aged 55); Wolfenbüttel
- Scientific career
- Fields: Mineralogy, botany

Franz Ernst Brückmann (27 September 1697 – 21 March 1753) was a German mineralogist born at Marienthal near Helmstedt. Having qualified as a physician in 1721, he practised at Braunschweig and afterwards at Wolfenbüttel (from 1728). In 1747 he was appointed medical assessor in Braunschweig.

His leisure time was given up to natural history, and especially to mineralogy and botany. He appears to have been the first to introduce the term "oolithus" to rocks that resemble in structure the roe of a fish; whence the terms "oolite" and "oolitic". He died at Wolfenbüttel.

== Publications ==
- Kurtze Beschreibung und genaue Untersuchung des fürtrefflichen Weitzen-Biers Duckstein genannt (in German). Braunschweig. 1723.
- Magnalia Dei in locis subterraneis (Brunswick, 1727).
- Historia naturalis curiosa lapidis (1727).
- Thesaurus subterraneus Ducatus Brunsvigii (1728).
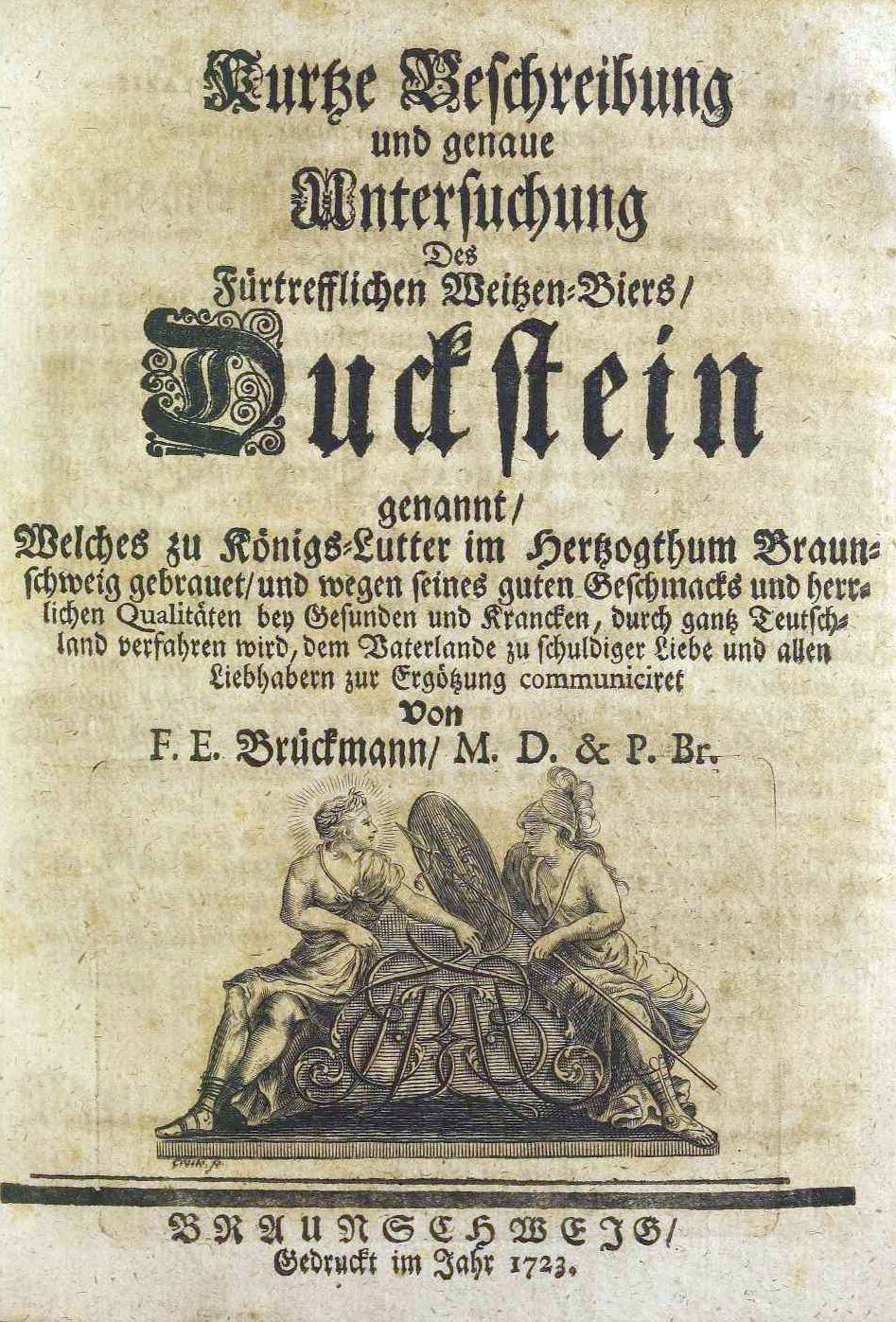
Kurtze Beschreibung und genaue Untersuchung des fürtrefflichen Weitzen-Biers Duckstein genannt, 1723
