= Johann Caspar Barthel =

German canon lawyer

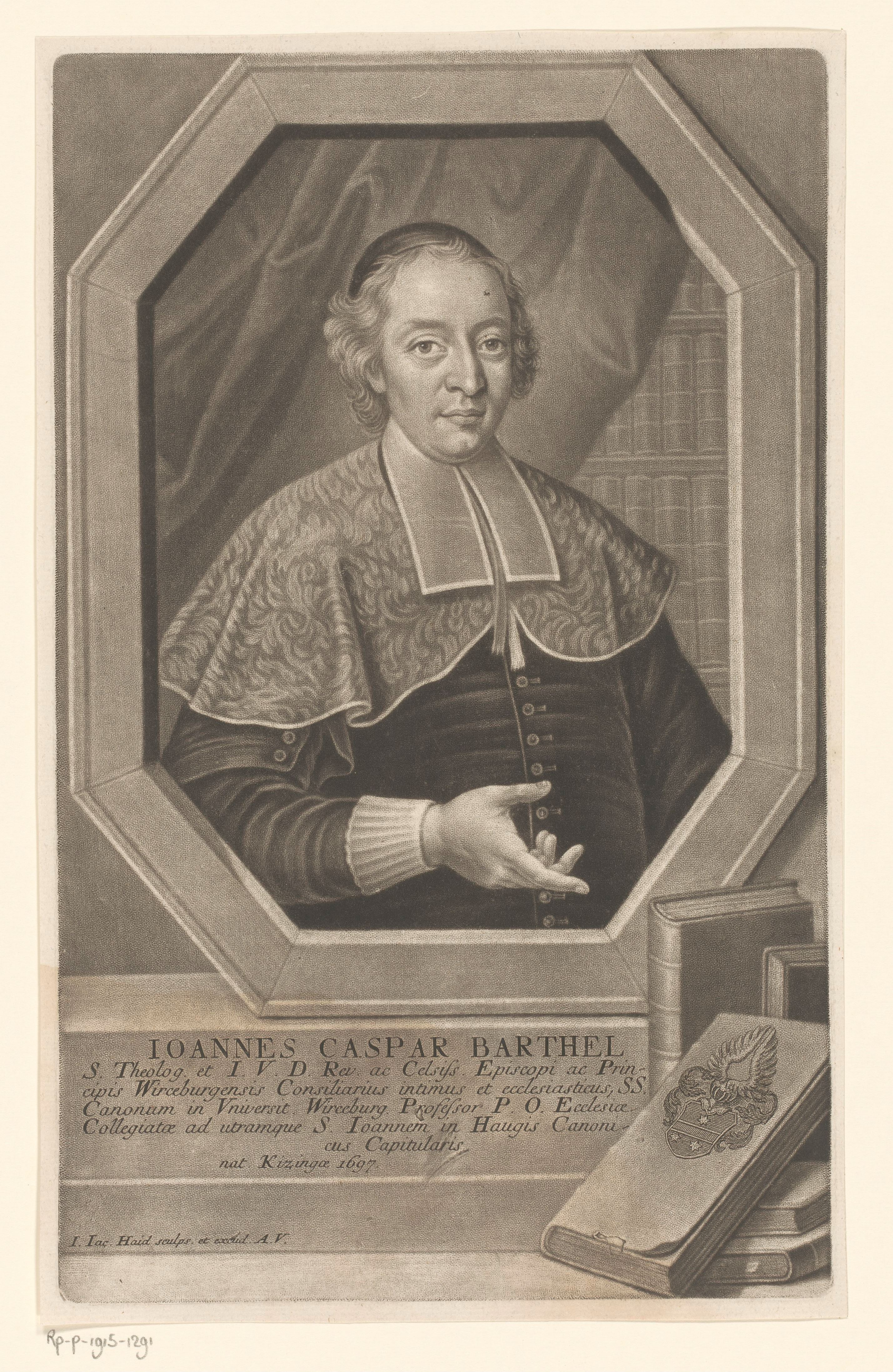
The portrait of Johann Caspar Barthel

Johann Caspar Barthel (10 June 1697 – 8 April 1771) was a German canon lawyer.

== Biography ==
He was born at Kitzingen, Bavaria, the son of a fisherman, attended school in Kitzingen, and from 1709 to 1715 studied at the Jesuit College at Würzburg. In 1715 he entered the seminary of the latter city and in 1721 was ordained priest.

Christopher von Hutten, Prince-Bishop of Würzburg, sent him, in 1725, to Rome to study ecclesiastical law under Prosper Lambertini, later Pope Benedict XIV. Barthel returned as Doctor Utriusque Juris, in 1727, to Würzburg, where he became president of the seminary and (1728) professor of canon law at the university.

Other ecclesiastical and academical honours, among them the vice-chancellorship of the university (1754), were conferred upon him. He took an active part in settling the controversy occasioned by the erection of the new Diocese of Fulda (1752).

As a teacher, he was appreciated by both Catholics and Protestants, and his lectures were circulated at various schools. He broke with the traditional method in canonical science, being one of the first to adopt the historico-critical treatment in Germany. His efforts to distinguish between the essentials and non-essentials in Catholic doctrines, and his attribution of excessive power to the State in its relations with the Church caused his opinions to be denounced at Rome as unorthodox.

Any belief that Barthel was a Jesuit is mistaken (see http://www.deutsche-biographie.de/sfz2142.html).

== Works ==
In his "Promemoria" (1751) he submitted his views and method to his former teacher, Benedict XIV, and obtained a favourable decision. His works, apart from what was written in the Fulda controversy, as "De Pallio" (1753), deal principally with the relations between Church and State, especially in Germany. Several of them are found in the "Opuscula juridica varii argumenti" (Würzburg, 1765, 1771).
