= Carlo Arrigoni =

Italian composer and musician

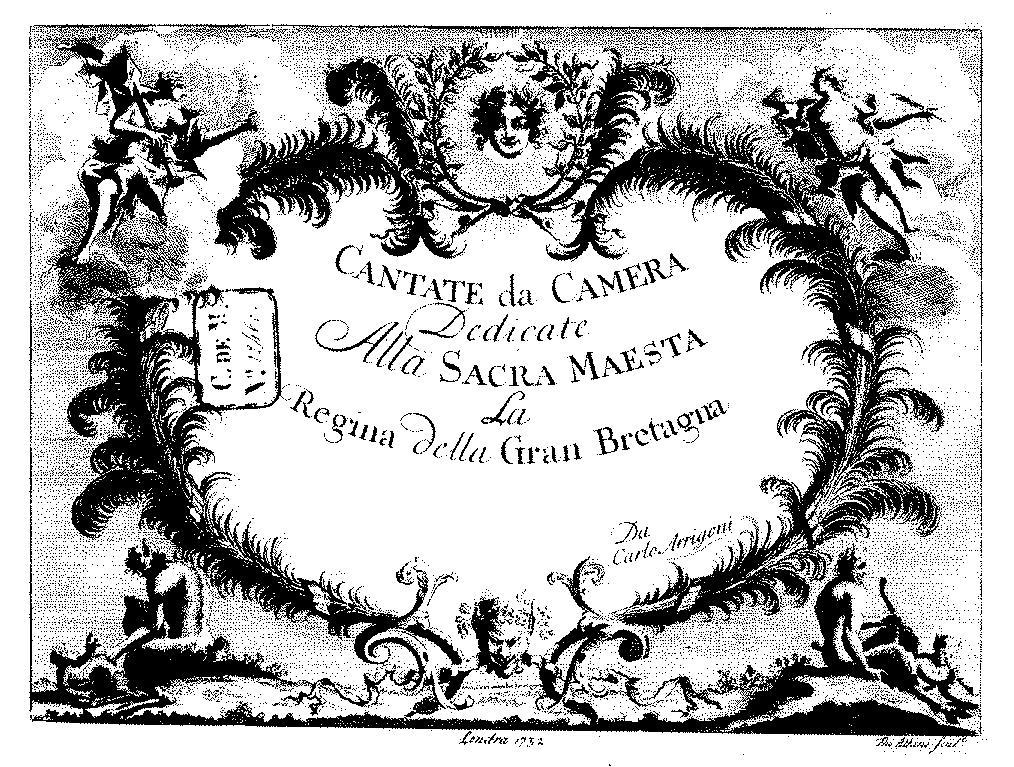
Carlo Arrigoni's chamber cantatas, published in 1732 and dedicated to the English queen

Carlo Arrigoni (6 December 1697 – 19 August 1744) was an Italian composer and musician who was active in several countries during the first half of the 18th century.

== Life and work ==
Arrigoni was born in Florence, Grand Duchy of Tuscany. Little is known of his early years or musical education. His first oratorio was performed in his native city in 1719 and was followed by Il Pentimento d’Accabo (Accabo’s repentance, 1722), a setting for five voices of a poem by his relative, Father Crisostomo Arrigoni. His opera La Vedova (The widow) was also performed that same year in Foligno. The next mention of Arrigoni is in Brussels, then part of the Austrian Netherlands, where Il Pentimento d’Accabo was performed in 1728. At the start of the 1730s, he was working at the Dublin Academy of Music, then transferred to London in 1732. There, he published chamber cantatas dedicated to the English queen, Caroline of Ansbach, and shared in the musical life of the capital until 1736.

In April 1733, Arrigoni performed his own concerto for the lute and then became associated with the Opera of the Nobility, set up in opposition to George Frideric Handel. Performances there of his opera Fernando earned him inclusion in John Arbuthnot’s satirical pamphlet, Harmony in an Uproar (dated 1733). This takes the form of a pastiche of Arrigoni's opera under the name of "The King of Arragon”. Arrigoni was noted not only as a performer on lute and harpsichord, but also as a singer, and was eventually recruited to take part in Handel’s productions. During 1736, he is recorded as playing the lute at the premiere of Handel’s choral work Alexander’s Feast and in his concerto for lute (opus 4.6), as well as performing as tenor soloist in the cantata Cecilia, volgi un sguardo.

From London, Arrigoni went on to Vienna for two years, where he produced several cantatas and his oratorio, Ester (1738). On his return to Florence he was appointed composer to Francesco II, Grand Duke of Tuscany. His operas Sibace and Scipione nelle Spagne were performed in 1739. The second of these was a setting of the same libretto as Handel's 1726 opera of the same name. In 1743, a setting of another poem by Crisostomo Arrigoni was performed at a sacred concert. Arrigoni also wrote instrumental music. His chamber sonatas now have a growing and appreciative following. He died in Florence.

== Selected works ==
- Fernando (wrongly attributed by Burney to Porpora) Opera of the Nobility, London 1733–34
