= John Grout =

John Grout (c.1643 – 25 July 1697) was an American colonial military figure and selectman for Sudbury, Massachusetts for thirty years.

== Biography ==
John Grout was born in England but immigrated to Massachusetts during the Puritan migration to New England (1620-1640) and soon became acquainted with governor John Winthrop. Grout's early life is mostly unknown.

Grout was in Watertown by 1660 and moved to Sudbury by 1663, becoming a leading citizen. He organized the town militia, ultimately attaining the rank of captain. Politically, he served as selectman for thirty years between 1647 and 1692. Additionally, he served as the town clerk for seven years. In 1676, he was ordered to Boston, Massachusetts to discuss the Indian tribes around Sudbury with governor John Leverett and the council.

Grout's fame rests primarily from an event that occurred on April 20, 1676, during King Philip's War. 500 to 1,500 Indians attacked Sudbury, destroying much of the town. Captain Grout, then about sixty years old, and a few of his men held the Indians in check for about three hours until reinforcements arrived.
