= Augustine Françoise de Choiseul =

French aristocrat

Augustine Françoise de Choiseul, also known as Mademoiselle St Cyr and Mademoiselle de Choiseul (8 October 1697 — 5 July 1728), was a French aristocrat. She was the subject of a long legitimization process to determine her biological parentage, which created great attention.

== Life ==
Choiseul was the daughter of Louise Gabrielle de La Baume Le Blanc de la Vallière (1665-1698): her mother was married to César Auguste de Choiseul de Plessis-Praslin (1637-1705), but lived separated from him. After her birth, she was entrusted to her mother's friend Madame de Hautefort, Marie-Françoise Pompadour, who raised her and gave her the title Mademoiselle St Cyr after one of her properties. She was ignored by her official father and the family of her mother, who gave her no income whatsoever, and in 1723, she sued her uncle duke Charles François de La Valliere before the Paris Parliament to prove her parentage. The trial was one of the biggest scandals of the era. The court proceedings were not finished before 1726.

Augustine Françoise de Choiseul was made the heir of her foster mother Marie Françoise Hélie de Pompadour, Marquise de Hautefort (1648–1726). The inheritance also included the Hôtel Chanac de Pompadour in Paris, which Augustine Françoise de Choiseul renounced by means of an amicable settlement in the inheritance dispute with Marie Anne Henriette, Marquise de Rochechouart, née d'Espinay Saint-Luc (1673–1731), on 7 June 1728.
