= Leopold Innocenty Nepomucen Polzer =

Polish lawyer

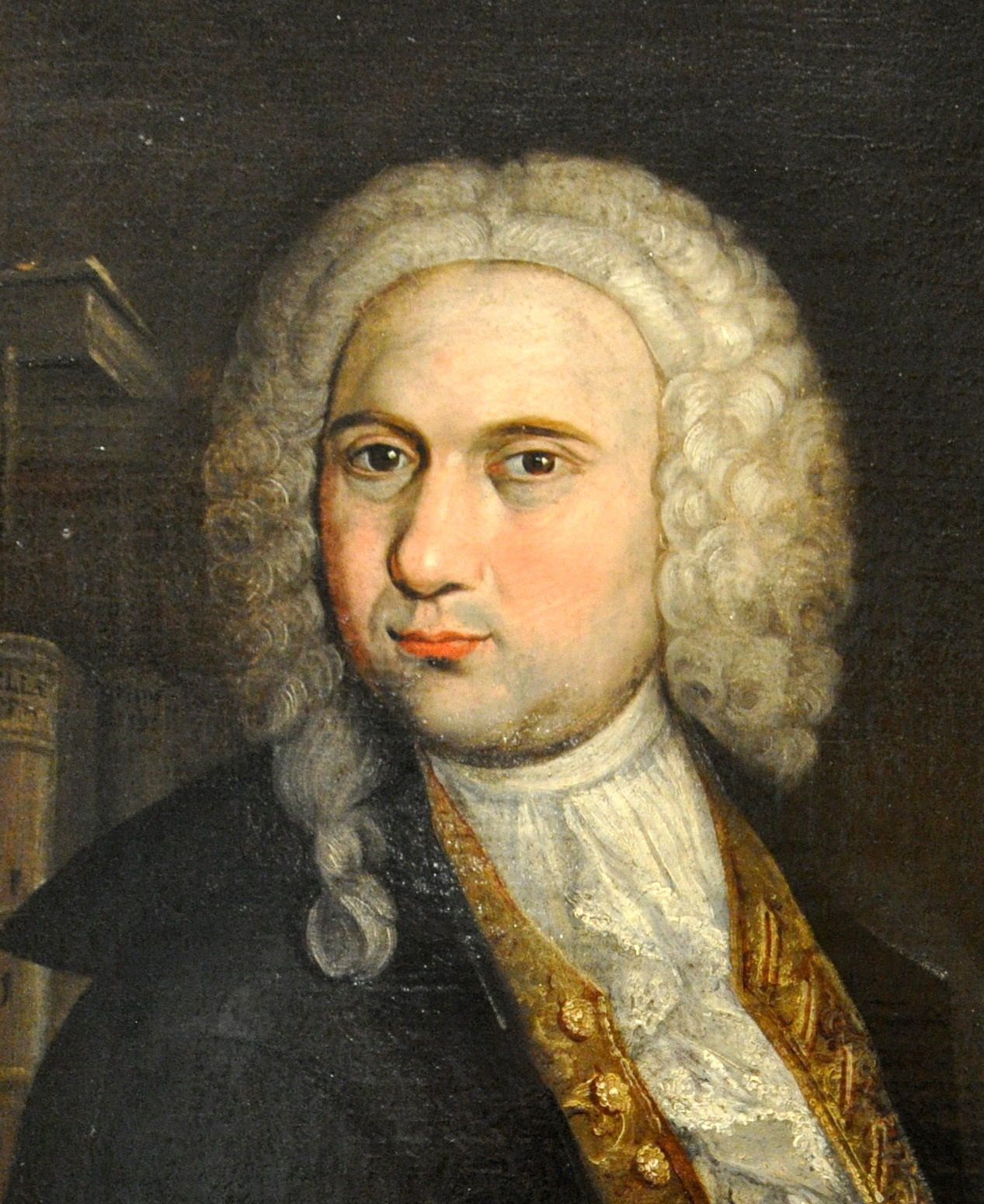
Leopold Polzer

Leopold Innocenty Nepomucen Polzer (15 October 1697 – 5 January 1753) was a Polish lawyer.

Polzer was born and died in Cieszyn. He was mayor of Cieszyn from 1735 until 1750, founder of Latinae Sodalitatis Teschini, and the grandfather of Leopold Szersznik.

Political offices
Preceded by Henryk de Rudolphi	Mayor of Cieszyn; 1735–1750	Succeeded by Franciszek Bilowitzky
