= Sauveur François Morand =

French surgeon (1697–1773)

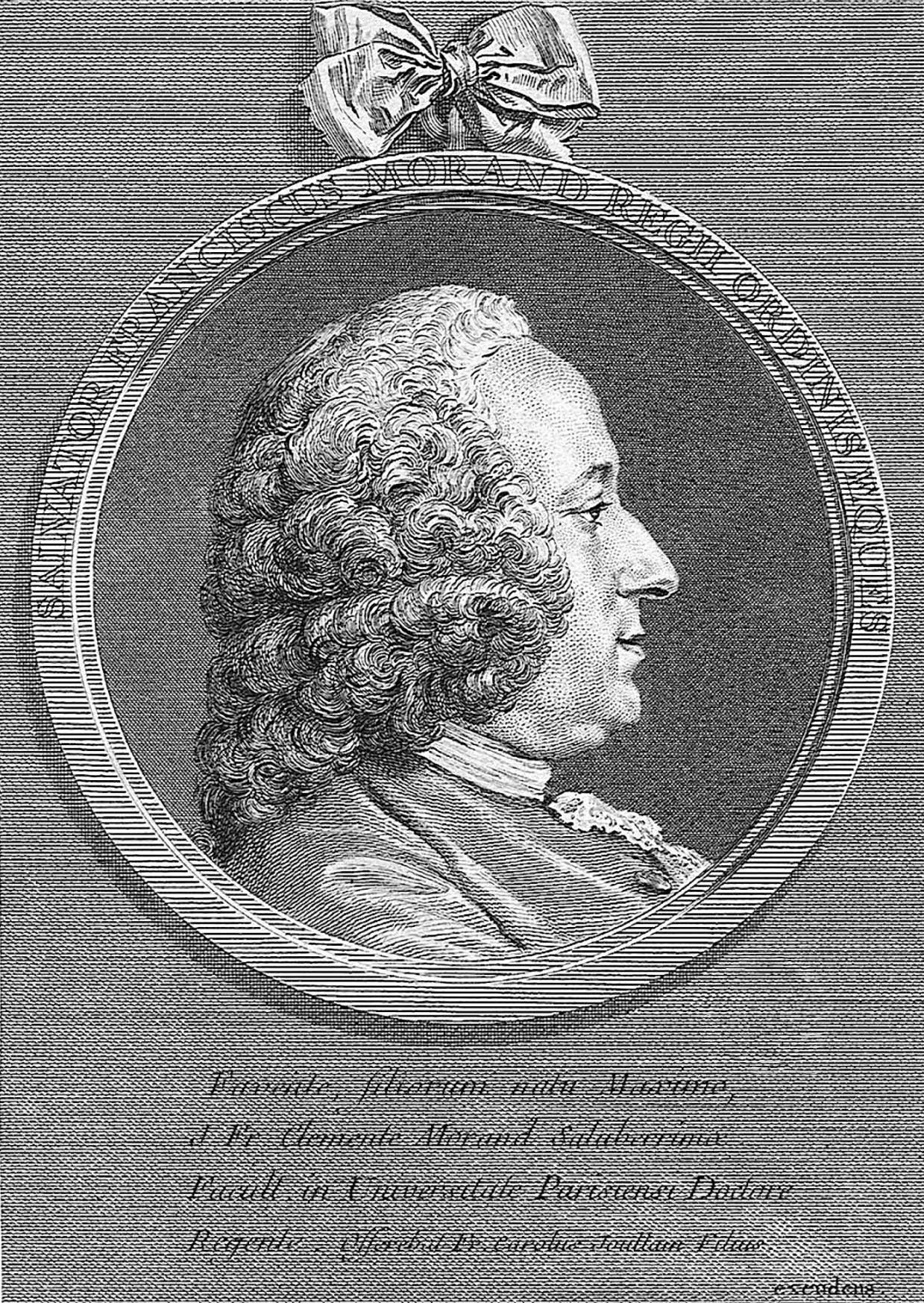
Sauveur François Morand (1697–1773)

Sauveur François Morand (2 April 1697, Paris – 21 July 1773) was a French surgeon.

== Biography ==
In 1724, he became a demonstrator of surgery at the Jardin du Roi in Paris, followed by service as censeur royal and a surgeon at the Hôpital de la Charité (from 1730). He was later appointed surgeon-major of the Régiment des Gardes françaises (1739) and chief-surgeon at the Hôtel des Invalides.

He was a founding member of the Académie de chirurgie (1731), and a member of numerous learned societies in Europe. In 1725 he was elected as a member of the Académie Royale des Sciences.

In 1729, while visiting St. Thomas's Hospital in London, he had the opportunity to learn William Cheselden's new procedure for stone cut, the lateral perineal lithotomy, a procedure that involved filling the bladder with water. Whilst in England he was elected a Fellow of the Royal Society.

In a 1766 treatise titled, "Sur un enfant auquel il manquoit les deux clavicules", etc., he was the first physician to describe cleidocranial dysostosis.

== Family ==
He was son of Jean Morand (1659-1726), who served as chief surgeon at the Hôtel des Invalides, and the son-in-law of Georges Maréchal, first surgeon to Louis XIV and then to Louis XV. His son, Jean François-Clément Morand (1726-1784) taught classes in anatomy and obstetrics.

== Associated eponym ==
- "Morand's spur": The lower of two elevations on the medial wall of the posterior horn of the lateral ventricle of the brain. It is caused by lateral extension of the calcarine sulcus. Sometimes referred to as "Haller's unguis".

== Selected published works ==
- Traité de la taille au haut appareil, 1728.
- "A dissertation on the high operation for the stone", published in English, 1729.
- Discours pour prouver qu'il est nécessaire à un chirurgien d'être lettré, 1743.
- Receuil d'expériences et d'observations sur la pierre; (with François Brémond), two volumes, 1743.
- Sur un enfant auquel il manquoit les deux clavicules, le sternum et les cartilages, qui dans l'état naturel l'attachent aux côtes. Histoire de l'Académie Royale des sciences, Paris, (1760), 1766: 47–48. (Contains first description of cleidocranial dysostosis.
- Opuscules de chirurgie, two volumes, 1768 and 1772.
