= Nicolas-Charles-Joseph Trublet =

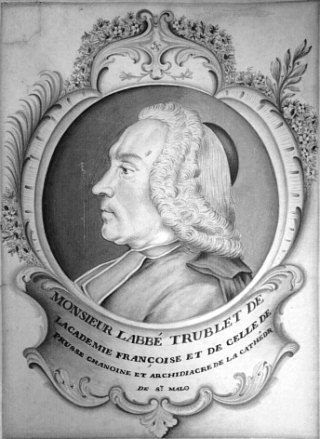

Nicolas Charles Joseph Trublet (French pronunciation: [nikɔla ʃaʁl ʒozɛf tʁyblɛ]; 4 December 1697, Saint-Malo, Province of Brittany – 14 March 1770, Saint-Malo) was a French churchman (canon of Saint-Malo) and moralist, best known for his clash with Voltaire, whose La Henriade he critiqued.

== Works ==
- Réflexions sur Télémaque (1717)
- Essais sur divers sujets de littérature et de morale (1735). Édition en 2 volumes : 1749. Édition en 4 volumes : 1754-60. Réédition : Slatkine, Genève, 1968.
- Panégyriques des saints, précédés de Réflexions sur l'éloquence en général, et sur celle de la chaire en particulier (1755)
- Mémoires pour servir à l'histoire de la vie et des ouvrages de M. de Fontenelle, tirés du « Mercure de France », 1756, 1757 et 1758 (1759)
- Un journal de la vie littéraire au XVIIIe siècle : La correspondance de l'Abbé Trublet, documents inédits sur Voltaire, La Beaumelle, Malesherbes, Fontenelle, Mme Geoffrin, La Condamine, etc. (1926)
