= Franz Neumayr =

German Jesuit preacher and writer

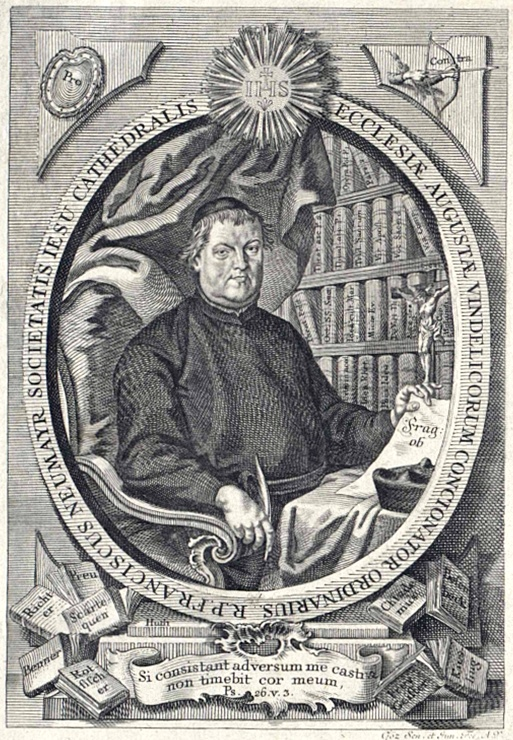
Franz Neumayr

Franz Neumayr (17 January 1697 – 1 May 1765) was a German Jesuit preacher, writer on theological, controversial and ascetical subjects, and author of many Latin dramas on sacred themes.

== Life ==
He was born at Munich, entered the Society of Jesus 3 October 1712, and after his studies in the Society, taught rhetoric and belles lettres for ten years. He then for two years preached on the missions, and he was made director of the Latin sodality at Munich, a post which he filled for eleven years.

From 1752 to 1763 he preached at Augsburg Cathedral. His controversial sermons were directed in a great part against the Lutherans, and in particular against the apostate monk Franz Ignatius Rothfischer, and Chladonium. He died at Augsburg.

== Works ==
His works, as enumerated in Sommervogel, number 112 books and pamphlets. They include: Latin plays for the use of his Latin sodality, which periodically staged such productions for the pleasure and edification of the literary men of Munich; sermons which he had delivered in the pulpit of Augsburg cathedral; works on asceticism; treatises on rhetoric and poetry; and some essays on moral theology in defence of the Jesuit system.

Some of his Latin plays were republished in two collections:

- Theatrum Asceticum, sive Meditationes Sacrae in Theatro Congregationis Latinae de B. V. Mariae, ab Angelo Salutatae exhibitae Monachi verno jejunii tempore ab anno 1739 usque ad annum 1747 (871 pp., Ingolstadt and Augsburg, 1747, 5 editions) contains dramatic renderings of such subjects as the conversion of St. Augustine, devotion to the Blessed Virgin Mary, the evil of sin, the fear of God, Divine Mercy and Love.
- Theatrum Politicum sive Tragoediae ad commendationem Virtutis et Vitiorum detestationem, etc. (Augshurg and Ingolstadt, 1760, 518 pp.) contains episodes from the lives of Eutropius, Papinianus, Anastasius, Dicorus, Tobias, and Sara, etc. These plays, besides numerous others were published also in separate booklets.

On his ascetical writings probably the most famous and most valuable is the little book Idea Theologiae Asceticae, Scientiam Sanctorum exhibens, a posthumous work first published in Rome by Alexander Monaldi in 1839. It has gone through five editions in Latin and has been translated into various languages. The English edition bears the title: The Science of the Spiritual Life.

He wrote also several works in defence of probabilism.

Of his literary treatises, the Idea Rhetorices deals with the precepts and use of rhetoric; Idea Poesis is a similar volume on poetry and in the title he says of the art, "Ad Ingeniorum Culturam, Animorum Oblectationem ac Morum Doctrinam".
