= Sakaki Hyakusen =

Japanese painter

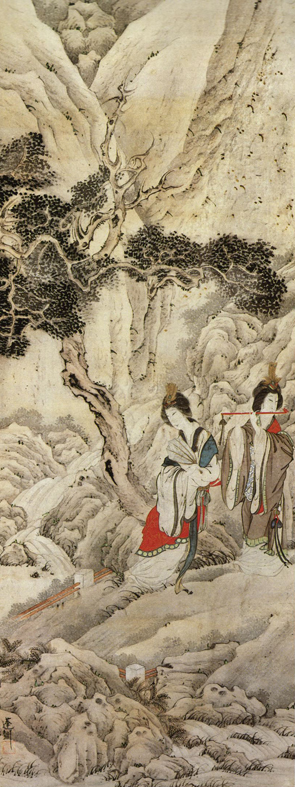
Two Chinese Ladies by a Stream

Sakaki Hyakusen, originally Shin'en (Japanese: 彭城 百川; (11 December 1697, in Nagoya – 2 October 1752, in Kyōto) was a Japanese painter in the nanga style. His other art names included Hōshū (蓬洲), Senkan (僊観) and Hassendō (八仙堂).

== Life and work ==
His father was a pharmacist and he may have been of at least partial Chinese descent. As a young man, he moved to Kyōto, where he studied painting with artists of the Kanō School and learned how to write haiku. Soon, however, he turned to Chinese painting; especially from the Yuan and Ming dynasties, becoming one of the earliest practitioners of the nanga style. As with many of the early nanga artists, his works were of variable quality. His earliest dated painting was from 1720.

He also painted in the Yamato-e style and produced haiga (paintings associated with haiku writing). Another influence on his work were the landscapes known as "Shinkei" (真景; roughly, "True View"), that depicted actual places. Many of his compositions include elements incorporated directly from Chinese paintings, offering a record of specific influences derived from China.

He was awarded the honorary title of "Hokkyō" (法橋; "Bridge of the Law"), which was given to artists who practiced Buddhism, and was one of the few nanga painters to earn a living entirely from his art. Some of his best known works are the "Screen with Landscapes" (山水図屏風, which has been designated an Important Cultural Property), and a screen called "Plums and Bamboo" (梅竹図). The former is in the Tokyo National Museum and the latter is privately owned.

Besides the Tokyo National Museum, his work is also kept in a variety of other museums, including the Walters Art Museum, University of Michigan Museum of Art, the British Museum, the Seattle Art Museum, the Asian Art Museum in San Francisco, the Harvard Art Museums, the Minneapolis Institute of Art, the Philadelphia Museum of Art, and the Metropolitan Museum of Art.

== Sources ==
- Tazawa, Yutaka: "Sakaki Hyakusen". In: Biographical Dictionary of Japanese Art. Kodansha International, 1981. ISBN 0-87011-488-3.
- Laurance P. Roberts: "Hyakusen". In: A Dictionary of Japanese Artists. Weatherhill, 1976. ISBN 0-8348-0113-2.
