= List of compositions by Daron Hagen =

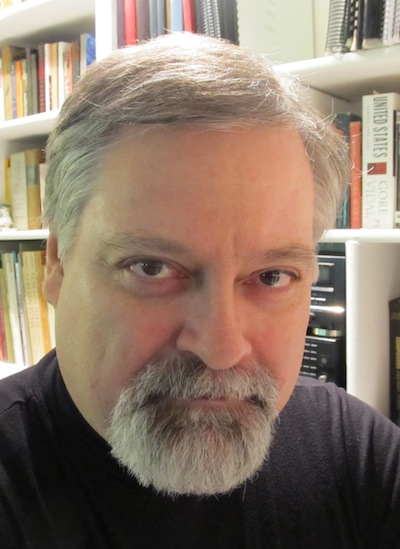
Daron Hagen in 2012

This is a list of compositions by Daron Hagen (born 1961).

== Orchestra ==
- (1982) Andersonville Overture
- (1985) Symphony No. 1
- (1986) Grand Line: a Tribute to Leonard Bernstein
- (1990) Heliotrope
- (1990) Symphony No. 2
- (1991) Philharmonia
- (1992) Fire Music
- (1996) Built Up Dark for strings, winds and brass
- (1997) Postcards from America
- (1998/2010) Symphony No. 3
- (2000) Suddenly
- (2000) Much Ado
- (2001) Advance
- (2003) Susurrus (Haiku #1)
- (2005) Gesture Drawings
- (2009) Symphony No. 4
- (2009) Northern Lights (Haiku #2)
- (2010) con gai: a greeting and a farewell (Haiku #3)
- (2012) Sky Interludes from Amelia
- (2014) Symphony No. 5
- (2017) Chaplin Suite
- (2018) A Chaplin Symphony
- (2019) The Passion of Jekyll and Hyde
- (2021) Bandanna Overture
- (2022) Moviola for large orchestra
- (2024) City of Light for orchestra
- (2025) Consolation for orchestra (Haiku #4)

== String orchestra ==
- (1981) Prayer for Peace
- (2001) Angels

== Orchestra with voice(s) ==
- (1994) Joyful Music for chorus and orchestra
- (1996) Taliesin: Choruses from Shining Brow for chorus and orchestra
- (1996) Stewards of Your Bounty for chorus and orchestra
- (2023) Everyone, Everywhere for soloists, choir and orchestra

== Concertante ==
- (1982) Stanzas for cello and chamber orchestra
- (1994) Concerto for Horn, with Winds and Strings
- (1994) Concerto for Flügelhorn and Wind Ensemble
- (1996) Concerto for Cello and Orchestra
- (1998) Concerto for Cello and Wind Orchestra
- (2001) Concerto for Oboe and String Orchestra
- (2001) Concerto No. 1 for Piano and Orchestra
- (2002) Seven Last Words: concerto for piano LH and orchestra
- (2004) Romeo and Juliet: concerto for flute, cello and orchestra
- (2006) Orpheus and Eurydice: concerto for violin, cello, piano and orchestra
- (2007) Masquerade: concerto for violin, cello and orchestra
- (2010) Genji: concerto for koto and orchestra
- (2011) Songbook: concerto for solo violin, strings, harp, and percussion
- (2015) Concerto No. 2: Chaplin's Tramp: concerto for piano, film, and orchestra
- (2023) Film Noir: Concerto for Electric Guitar and Orchestra

== Operas, cantatas, and musicals ==
- (1984) A Walt Whitman Requiem for chorus and string orchestra
- (1991) Shining Brow (libretto: Paul Muldoon)
- (1997) Vera of Las Vegas (libretto: Paul Muldoon)
- (1997) Songs of Madness and Sorrow (libretto: Daron Hagen)
- (1998) Bandanna (libretto: Paul Muldoon)
- (2000) Light Fantastic (libretto: Daron Hagen)
- (2005) The Antient Concert (libretto: Paul Muldoon)
- (2008) New York Stories (libretto: Barbara Grecki, Daron Hagen)
  - consists of three one act operas: Broken Pieces, Just for the Night, and Cradle Song
- (2009) Amelia (libretto: Gardner McFall; story: Stephen Wadsworth)
- (2010) Little Nemo in Slumberland (libretto: J.D. McClatchy)
- (2012) The George Washington Suite (libretto: Rob Handel)
- (2013) A Woman in Morocco (libretto: Barbara Grecki, Daron Hagen, after a play by Barbara Grecki)
- (2014) I Hear America Singing (musical; book, lyrics, and music by Daron Hagen)
- (2018) Orson Rehearsed (multi-media opera; films, libretto, concept, music, and direction by Daron Hagen)
- (2021) 9/10: Love Before the Fall (operafilm; libretto: Daron Hagen)
- (2023) Everyone, Everywhere (libretto: Universal Declaration of Human Rights)

== Songs and song cycles ==
- (1982) Echo's Songs
- (1984) Three Silent Things for soprano and piano quartet
- (1986) Love Songs
- (1987) Rapture and Regret for soprano, cello and piano
- (1990) Muldoon Songs
- (1991) Dear Youth for soprano, flute and piano
- (1993) Lost in Translation for voice, oboe, cello and harpsichord
- (1996) Merrill Songs
- (1996) Love Scene from Romeo and Juliet for two voices, flute, violin and piano
- (2000) The Heart of the Stranger
- (2000) Love in a Life
- (2000) Phantoms of Myself
- (2001) Figments
- (2001) Larkin Songs
- (2003) Letting Go
- (2004) Sappho Songs for two female voices and cello
- (2007) Songs of Experience
- (2009) Four Irish Folk Songs for two voices and piano
- (2010) We Happy Few scena for baritone and piano
- (2011) Vegetable Verselets
- (2011) After Words for two voices and piano
- (2014) Four Dickinson Songs
- (2015) jaik's songs for voice and piano
- (2015) The Bixby Letter for voice and piano
- (2016) Blake Songs for voice and mixed ensemble, or piano
- (2016) A Handful of Days for soprano and piano
- (2017) Dante Fragments for soprano, violin, and piano
- (2017) On the Beach at Night scena for baritone, cello and piano
- (2019) The Art of Song twenty-three songs for six solo voices and piano
- (2020) Mata Hari Letters for voice and piano
- (2020) Four Songs for Mezzo Soprano and Piano
- (2021) Dante Fragments for tenor, violin, cello, and vibraphone
- (2021) Four Shakespeare Fragments for voice and piano
- (2021) All We Have for high voice and piano
- (2022) Three Whitman Fragments for voice and string quartet
- (2022) Restoring Darkness for voice

== Mixed chamber ensemble ==
- (1984) Divertimento for viola, harp, and vibraphone
- (1984) Piano Trio No. 1: Trio Concertante
- (1985) String Quartet No. 1
- (1985) Sonata No. 1 for Flute and Piano
- (1986) Piano Trio No. 2: J'entends
- (1988) The Presence Absence Makes, for flute and string quartet
- (1989) Harp Trio
- (1989) Jot! for clarinet, marimba, and piano
- (1993) Everything Must Go! for brass quintet
- (1994) Music from Shining Brow for brass quintet
- (1995) Concerto for Brass Quintet
- (1996) An Overture to Vera for fourteen instruments
- (1997) Duo for Violin and Cello
- (2000) Serenade for ten instruments
- (2001) Quintet for Oboe and Strings
- (2001) Nocturne for piano and strings
- (2002) Snapshot for string quartet
- (2002) Variant for string quartet
- (2003) Chamber Symphony for thirteen instruments
- (2003) Sonata No. 2 for Flute and Piano
- (2003) String Quartet No. 2: Alive in a Moment for voice and string quartet
- (2006) Piano Trio No. 3: Wayfaring Stranger
- (2007) Piano Trio No. 4: Angel Band
- (2009) Just Amazed for eleven players
- (2010) Book of Days for clarinet, viola and piano
- (2011) Tryst for oboe, bassoon and piano
- (2012) Quiet Heart for violin and piano
- (2012) String Quartet No. 3
- (2013) Early, Later for clarinet and piano
- (2014) Valse Noire for cello and piano
- (2014) Valse Blanche for violin and piano
- (2015) The Heike Quinto: Appassionato for koto and cello
- (2016) The Heike Quinto: Cantabile for koto and cello
- (2017) The Heike Quinto: Misterioso for koto, voice, and cello
- (2017) Sonata for Violoncello and Piano
- (2017) Piano Trio No. 5: Red is the Rose
- (2017) Lilly Sketches for woodwind quintet
- (2017) Piano Trio No. 6: Horszowski
- (2018) The Heike Quinto: Grandioso for koto and cello
- (2019) Swan Song for koto, shamisen, shakuhachi, and string quartet
- (2019) Piano Trio No. 7: Wintergreen
- (2020) Piano Trio No. 8: Pacifica
- (2022) The Heike Quinto: Apotheosis for koto, cello, and fixed media
- (2022) Cavatina from 9/10 for vocalise, flute, guitar, and harp
- (2023) Piano Trio No. 9: Lagniappe

== Solo ==
- (1984) Suite for Solo Violin
- (1985) Suite for Solo Cello
- (1985) Occasional Notes for organ
- (1986) Suite for Solo Viola
- (1987) Higher, Louder, Faster! for solo cello
- (1999) Qualities of Light for piano
- (2002) Piano Variations
- (2009) Suite for Piano
- (2012) Five Nocturnes for piano
- (2012) Secrets My Mother Told Me for koto
- (2016) Anniversary: in Memoriam Leonard Bernstein for piano
- (2019) Nine Advent Postludes and Preludes for Organ

== Choral ==
- (1985) Vägen (SATB)
- (1985) The Voice Within (SATB/Pf)
- (1989) Little Prayers (SATB)
- (1995) The Waking Father (SSATBB)
- (1995) The Elephant's Child (SSATBB)
- (1997) Gandhi's Children (SA/Handbells)
- (1997) Hope (SATB/Pf)
- (1998) Silent Night, eight movements for chorus, cello and percussion
- (2002) We're All Here three poems for chorus and chamber ensemble (or SATB/Pf)
- (2004) I Had Rather (SATB)
- (2005) Vertue (SATB/Pf)
- (2005) Flight Music song cycle for treble chorus and string quartet
- (2006) O, For Such a Dream for soprano solo, mixed chorus, and piano
- (2009) Three Celtic Songs (SSA)
- (2015) Hymn of Forgiveness (SATB/Organ)
- (2016) I Hear America Singing (SSATB/Pf)
- (2024) Love Unknown (SATB/Organ)

== Band and wind ensemble ==
- (1990) Sennets, Cortege, and Tuckets
- (1998) Night, Again
- (1999) Forward! for brass and percussion
- (1999) Bandanna Overture
- (2000) Wedding Dances from Bandanna
- (2000) Prelude and Prayer from Bandanna
- (2007) Agincourt Fanfare for brass and timpani
- (2025) Envoi for wind ensemble

== Live to Film ==
- (2015) Concerto No. 2: Chaplin's Tramp: concerto for piano, film, and orchestra (Film: The Tramp)
- (2017) Chaplin Suite (Film: A Dog's Life)
- (2018) A Chaplin Symphony (Film: City Lights)
- (2018) Orson Rehearsed (multi-media opera; films, libretto, concept, music, and direction by Daron Hagen)
- (2019) The Passion of Jekyll and Hyde (Film: Doctor Jekyll and Mister Hyde)
- (2022) Too Much Johnson (Film: Too Much Johnson)

== See also ==
- Daron Hagen
- Category:Operas by Daron Hagen
