= Madison Opera =

Regional opera company based in Madison, Wisconsin, U.S.

Madison Opera is a regional opera company based in Madison, Wisconsin. It was founded in 1961 as an extension of the Madison Symphony Orchestra and came to national prominence in 1993 with the commissioning and premiering of Shining Brow, the opera about Frank Lloyd Wright by composer Daron Hagen and librettist Paul Muldoon.

The general director is Kathryn Smith and the artistic director is John DeMain. The company performs two major operas a year at Madison's Overture Hall, one smaller production in the Overture's Capitol Theater, and a free summer concert, Opera in the Park. It also offers the Opera Up Close series of preview lectures, which are later made available on the City of Madison's website.
