= Bandanna (opera) =

1999 opera by Daron Hagen

- Opera by Daron Hagen
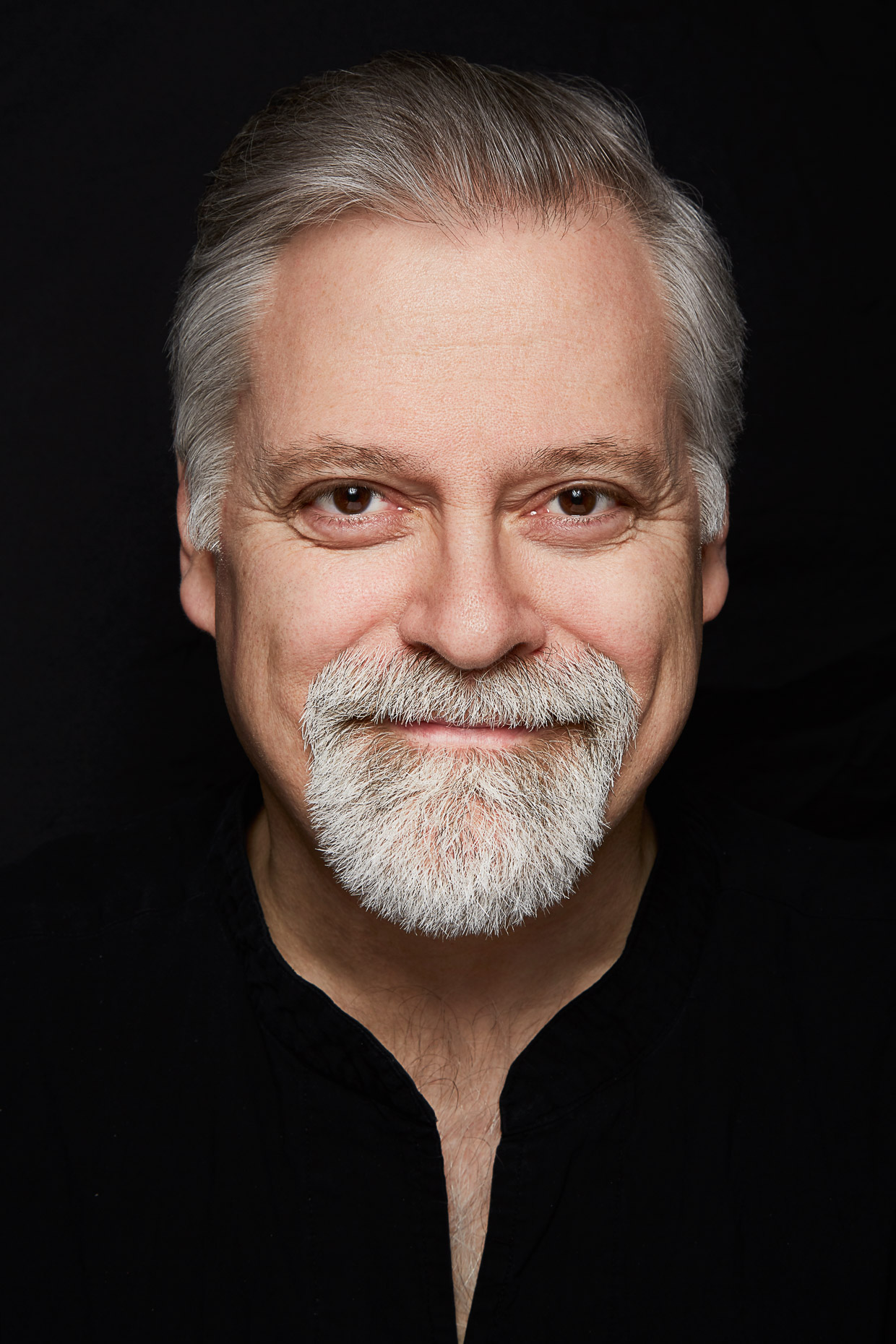
- Daron Hagen, the opera's composer
- Librettist: Paul Muldoon
- Language: English
- Premiere: February 25, 1999; University of Texas opera theater, Austin, Texas

Bandanna is an English language opera in a prologue and two acts by Daron Hagen, first performed by the University of Texas at Austin opera theater in Austin, February 25, 1999. The libretto is by Irish poet Paul Muldoon based on a treatment co-written with the composer. It is Hagen's third opera, after Shining Brow, and Vera of Las Vegas. The story of the Venetian Moor is recast and updated to 1968 by combining elements of the original Venetian story, William Shakespeare's Othello, Giuseppe Verdi's opera Otello, and new, original characters and situations. The opera's unifying concept is the idea of the borderlines between emotional, metaphysical and moral states. The commission itself is notable for two reasons: first, it stipulated that there be no strings (other than the customary string basses associated with symphonic band) in the pit, second, it was financed by a consortium of over one hundred college bands from across the United States, all members of the College Band Directors National Association.

"Bandanna is neither fish nor fowl – as fierce as verismo but wrought with infinite care; a melding of church and cantina and Oxonian declamation," writes Tim Page. Catherine Parsonage expands upon this assessment: "[it] is wholly convincing as a modern opera, ranging stylistically from the music theatre of Gershwin, Bernstein and Stephen Sondheim, to traditional mariachi music and contemporary opera of Benjamin Britten. Hagen, who served his apprenticeship on Broadway, acknowledges that holistically the piece falls between opera and musical theatre. Hagen's style encourages audiences to be actively involved in constructing their own meanings from the richness of the textual and musical cross-references in his work."

== Synopsis ==
Miguel Morales (Othello) is the police chief of a small town on the United States-Mexico border. His lieutenant Jake (Iago) is spiriting people across the border illegally; Kane (a Caucasian labor organizer from Chicago) is stirring up trouble. The action centers on the wedding of Jake and Emily (Emilia), the unfortunate planting of Mona's bandanna by Kane and Jake in Cassidy's (Cassio) pocket, and the subsequent murder of Mona by her husband.

=== Prologue ===
The desert. Day of the Dead 1968. Illegal immigrants cross the border into the US, where they are met by Jake.

=== Act One ===
The border town. Day of the Dead celebrations are in full swing. Mona and Emily talk about Emily's impending wedding, and how Morales won't forgive Mona's recent marital infidelity. Cassidy, Jake, and Kane are introduced: Jake fears Morales is on to his illegal activities; Cassidy seethes with racial hatred; Kane observes that much mischief can come of such a situation. A fistfight breaks out, is interrupted by the arrival of Morales, who has Cassidy arrested. The crowd disperses.

Later, Morales and his wife attempt a reconciliation; Jake expresses how much he hates living a double life, but that he feels morally bound to help the people he is bringing across the border. Kane convinces Jake that, by planting Mona's bandanna on Cassidy, they'll be able to drive Morales into destroying himself.

The next morning, Kane's labor rally is broken up by Morales and his men. Jake is exposed by one of the workers and realizes that he has no choice but to plant the bandanna. While Jake and Morales recall their service together in Vietnam, Jake pulls out the bandanna, which has the intended effect: Morales vows that, if what Jake is saying is true, he'll kill Mona.

=== Act Two ===
A few days later, Jake and Emily's wedding is in full swing. Over the course of a handful of formal dance numbers, Jake and Kane arrange for Cassidy and Mona to end up dancing. Morales loses control, lunges at the couple. Mona flees.

The wedding guests having left, Kane finds himself alone with a young serving girl from the local cantina. He seduces her, but, at the last moment, decides that physical consummation is irrelevant. His work here is done. He leaves.

A few weeks later, Emily brings groceries to Mona who has been hiding out in a cheap hotel room. Morales has been stalking her. The two women discuss what to do next. Mona seems to realize that it is only a matter of time before her husband finds her and kills her. After Emily leaves, Mona says her prayers and drifts off to sleep.

Morales silently breaks into the room, strangles Mona with the bandanna, then shoots Jake as he responds to Mona's cry; realizing what he has done, Morales turns the pistol on himself. As the shot rings out, a chorus of 'Disappeared and Dispossessed' sings a requiem for Mona.

== Roles ==
Role	Voice type	World Staged Premiere Cast 25 February 1999	Premiere Cast Recording 29 February 2000	European Concert Premiere 29 April 2006
Conductor		Michael Haithcock	Daron Hagen	Mark Heron
Director		Robert DeSimone		
Miguel Morales	tenor	William Lewis	Mark Thomsen	Christopher Turner
James Kane	dramatic baritone	Paul Kreider	Paul Kreider	Alistair McCall
Jake Lopez	lyric baritone	Daniel Terrazas	James Demler	Thomas Eaglen
Mona Morales	soprano	Kerry French	Darynn Zimmer	Sara Lawson
Cassidy	bass baritone	Edward White, Jr.	Travis Lewis	David Butt Philip
Emily Lopez	mezzo-soprano	Diane Rae Schoff	Lesley DeGroot	Charlotte Stephenson
Leader of the Company	tenor	Keith Gipson	Alfonse Anderson	
Townspeople, Etc.	mixed chorus	UT-Austin Chorus	UNLV Opera Chorus	Manchester Chamber Choir
Orchestra		UT-Band	UNLV Wind Symphony	North Cheshire Wind Orchestra
