= Kate Lindsey =

American mezzo-soprano opera singer (born 1980)

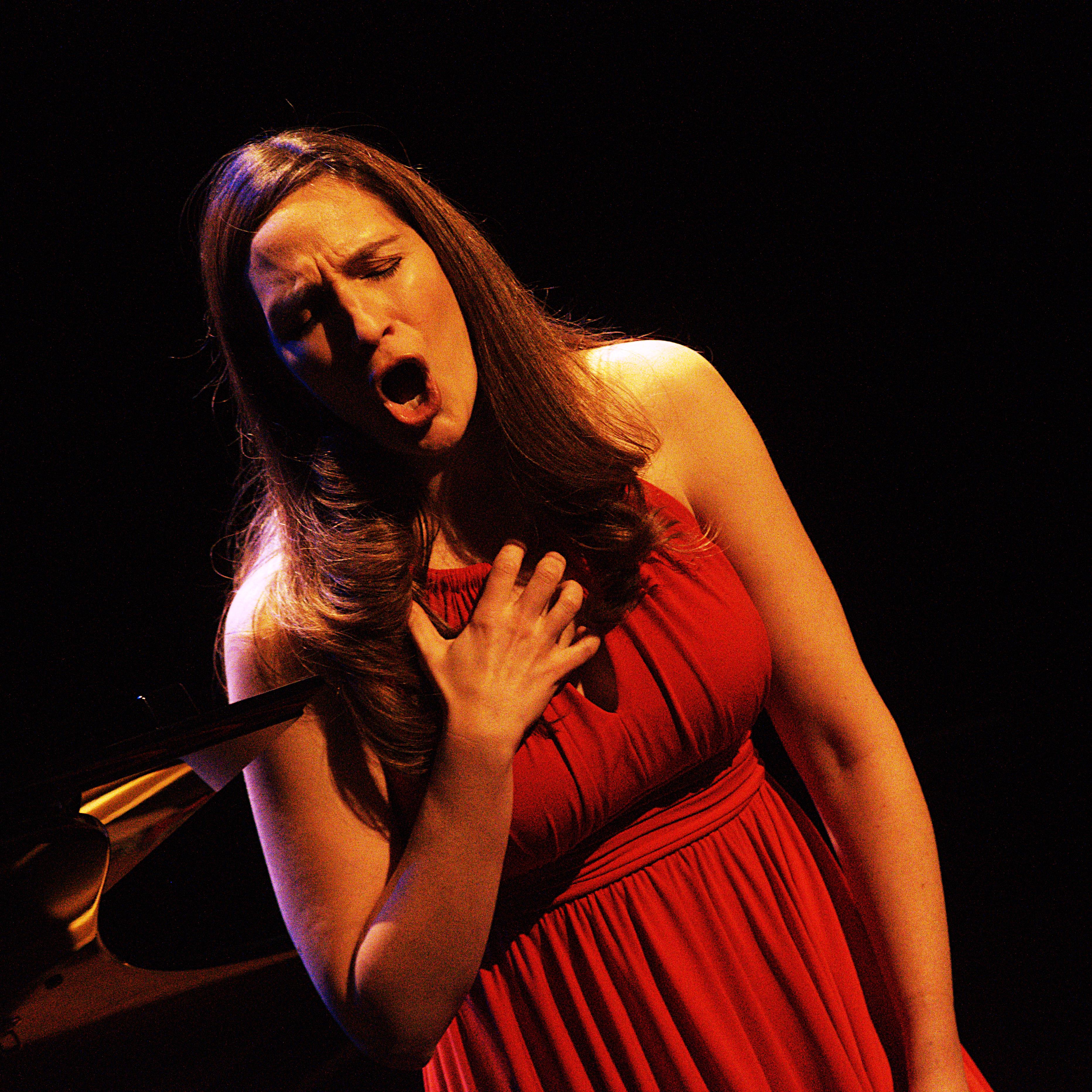

Background information
- Genres: opera
- Instrument: vocals (mezzo-soprano)
- Website: http://www.katelindsey.com

Kate Lindsey (born 1980) is a mezzo-soprano opera singer from the United States. She is married to the documentary filmmaker Olly Lambert.

Lindsey was born in Richmond, Virginia, and holds a Bachelor of Music Degree with Distinction from Indiana University School of Music in Bloomington. Her many awards include the 2007 Shoshana Foundation Richard F. Gold Career Grant, the 2007 George London Award in memory of Lloyd Rigler, the 2007 Lincoln Center Martin E. Segal Award, and a 2006 Sullivan Foundation Grant. She was named Seattle Opera's Artist of the Year in 2010. She is a graduate of the Metropolitan Opera's Lindemann Young Artist Development Program.

In 2015, Lindsey made her recording debut on Deutsche Grammophon with a performance of Mohammed Fairouz's 2012 cycle, Audenesque (in memory of W. B. Yeats), with the LPR Ensemble conducted by Evan Rogister (catalog no. B0022417).

== Roles ==
As a Gerdine Young Artist at the Opera Theatre of St. Louis, she performed as Stéphano in Gounod's Roméo et Juliette, Rosina in Rossini's Il Barbiere di Siviglia, and Mercédès in Bizet's Carmen.

As part of the Metropolitan Opera's Lindemann program, she made her debut as Javotte in Massenet's Manon, and also played Tebaldo in Verdi's Don Carlos and Siebel in Gounod's Faust. As a company member, starting in 2007, she has played Cherubino in Mozart's Nozze di Figaro, Stéphano in Gounod's Roméo et Juliette, the Madrigal Singer in Puccini's Manon Lescaut, Second Lady in Mozart's The Magic Flute (English version), Kitchen Boy in Dvořák's Rusalka, Wellgunde in Wagner's Das Rheingold and Götterdämmerung, Annio in Mozart's La Clemenza di Tito, and Muse/Nicklausse in Offenbach's Les Contes d'Hoffmann.

In 2008, she also sang the role of Cherubino in Mozart's Nozze di Figaro at the Opéra de Lille, conducted by Emmanuelle Haïm, and Ascanius in Berlioz's Les Troyens with the Boston Symphony Orchestra and at the Tanglewood Music Festival, both conducted by James Levine.

In 2009, she sang the role of Zerlina in Mozart's Don Giovanni with the Santa Fe Opera. In 2010, she made her Seattle Opera debut creating the title role in Amelia by Daron Hagen, and also sang Nicklausse and the role of Nancy in Albert Herring at the Santa Fe Opera. She has also performed at the Boston Lyric Opera and the Wolf Trap Opera.

She has also made numerous concert performances. She performed the roles of the Female Cat and the Squirrel in Ravel's L'Enfant et les sortileges at Carnegie Hall with the New York Philharmonic, conducted by Lorin Maazel, and sang the Elliott Carter song cycle In the Distances of Sleep at Tanglewood with James Levine.

In 2011, she premiered Jeder Mensch, a song cycle written for her by Mohammed Fairouz and sang Idamante in Mozart's Idomeneo, re di Creta.

In 2019, she made her Proms debut at the Royal Albert Hall with the John Wilson Orchestra, as soloist in "Tomorrow When You Are Gone" by Erich Korngold. Lindsey portrayed and sang the role of Nerone in Handel's Agrippina at the Metropolitan Opera New York in 2020 (Premiere: February 6).

On May 22, 2021, Lindsey again sang the role of Nerone, this time in the premiere of the Vienna State Opera production of Claudio Monteverdi's L'incoronazione di Poppea.

In the summer of 2025, she sang the role of Elisabetta in a high gloss production of Maria Stuarda by Gaetano Donizetti at the Salzburg Festival. The conductor was Antonello Manacorda, the director was Ulrich Rasche. Her rival queen, Maria Stuarda, was impersonated by Lisette Oropesa. Audience and press were delighted.
