= Carolann Page =

American singer and actress (born 1950)

- Born: December 22, 1950; Odessa, Texas
- Education: Philadelphia High School for Girls, Curtis Institute of Music
- Occupations: Singer; actress; teacher
- Years active: 1973–present
- Spouse: Paul Gemignani (1978–1996)
- Children: Alexander Gemignani
- Website: www.carolannpage.com

Carolann Page (born December 22, 1950) is an American singer and actress. She is a crossover artist with credits in musical theatre, opera, chamber music and concert repertoire.

== Career ==
Page gained international recognition in 1987 when she created the role of Pat Nixon in John Adams' opera Nixon in China, directed by Peter Sellars. She is on the Grammy Award-winning recording (Nonesuch) and the Emmy Award-winning PBS telecast on DVD. As published in The Guardian (London), "Carolann Page's lyric soprano exultantly ravishes the ear."

Page also created the roles of Celia in the revised version of Carlisle Floyd's The Passion of Jonathan Wade, Mamah Cheney in Daron Hagen's Shining Brow, Doll in Hagen's Vera of Las Vegas, and Gayle in Michael Tippett's The Ice Break (in concert). Standard operatic roles include all three heroines in Les Contes d'Hoffman, the title role in Massenet's Manon and Elvira in Don Giovanni. She has appeared with the major opera companies in Houston, Los Angeles, D.C., Cincinnati, Miami, Cleveland, Los Angeles, Pittsburgh, Edinburgh, Netherlands and the Bobigny in Paris.

Broadway appearances include Cunegonde in Hal Prince's revival of Candide, Music Is, directed by the legendary George Abbott, Majorie in Allegro (Encores!), directed by Susan Schulman, and Sondheim: A Celebration at Carnegie Hall, directed by Scott Ellis.

Off-Broadway, Page's diverse creations include Mary Lincoln in Asylum: The Strange Case of Mary Lincoln (York Theatre), Gertrude Stein in Blood on the Dining Room Floor (Signature Theatre), Sophie in The Fishkin Touch (Jewish Repertory Theatre), and the Iowa Housewife in Menopause, the Musical (Playhouse 91). Of her performance as Eleanor Roosevelt in Michael John LaChiusa's First Lady Suite (The Public Theater), Vincent Canby wrote in The New York Times, "Remember the name of Carolann Page..."

Page has appeared in concert and oratorio with the major symphonies of Dallas, Cleveland, Pittsburgh, Milwaukee, Philadelphia, Honolulu, Virginia, London, Brno and Prague in repertoire from Handel, Mendelssohn, Britten and Gorecki to her own Evening of Sondheim with the San Francisco and Boston Pops. Her chamber music and recital appearances include the festivals of Marlboro, Blossom, OK Mozart, Ambler, Chautauqua, Cape and Islands and the DaCamera Society.

Page made her professional debut in 1973 at the Marlboro Music Festival, as a soloist in Beethoven's Choral Fantasy conducted by Pablo Casals, with Rudolf Serkin at the piano.

== Biography ==
Page comes from a musical family. Her father was world renowned conductor, Robert Page and her mother, Glynn Page, voice teacher emeritus, Carnegie Mellon School of Drama. Her sister, Paula Page was principal harpist with the Houston Symphony (1984–2014) and serves on the faculties of Rice University and University of Houston. Page's son is Broadway actor, singer and music director, Alexander Gemignani.

Page has been teaching voice and acting since opening her own studio in New York City in 1984. She was a founding faculty member of the Professional Musical Theatre Workshop at the Manhattan School of Music (1992–2010) and was on the voice faculty at New York University's Steinhardt School of Music (1998–2002), where she also served as director of the Opera Theatre Workshop. Page is currently on the faculty at the Westminster College of the Arts of Rider University.

== Recordings ==
=== Discography ===
Year	Album
1974	Candide
1988	Nixon in China
1990	Song of Songs (Koss Classics)
1991	The Ice Break (Virgin Classics)
1991	Man of La Mancha (Sony Classics)
1992	Sondheim: A Celebration at Carnegie Hall (Masterworks Broadway)
2001	Vera of Las Vegas (CRI / New World)
2002	Menopause The Musical
2007	Asylum: The Strange Case of Mary Lincoln

=== Television ===
Year	Program
1987	Nixon In China, PBS Great Performance Series hosted by Walter Cronkite
2000	Law & Order (Season 10, Episode 18 "Mega")
