= Ashley Emerson =

American opera singer

Ashley Emerson (born April 20, 1984) is an American soprano who is a vocal instructor at the University of South Carolina School of Music. She has made more than 60 opera appearances since 2007, including starring roles at major venues; and she has received acclaim from various sources.

== Early life ==
Daughter of Robert and Beth Emerson, Emerson graduated Bangor High School in her native city of Bangor, Maine. She studied voice at the University of Southern Maine School of Music in Gorham, Maine.

== Career ==
Emerson made her debut at the Metropolitan Opera in New York City in Mozart's The Marriage of Figaro in the bridesmaids choir in 2007; and by 2011 had appeared on stage in 55 Met performances.

She starred as Alice in Unsuk Chin's 2007 opera Alice in Wonderland in its American premiere in 2012 at the Opera Theatre of Saint Louis. In 2010, Emerson appeared in the world premiere of Daron Hagen's opera Amelia as Young Amelia.

In 2017, Emerson starred as Papagena in Mozart's The Magic Flute under the baton of James Levine, with staging by Julie Taymor.

She has starred in several productions, including Gaetano Donizetti's L'elisir d'amore, Benjamin Britten's The Turn of the Screw with Dallas Opera, Gretel in Engelbert Humperdinck's Hansel and Gretel at Seattle Opera, and Francis Poulenc's Dialogues of the Carmelites at the Kennedy Center

As reviewed in Opera News, Emerson's vocal technique has been described as immaculate, concentrated and sweet; "especially when soaring into its upper register."

== Personal life ==
Emerson is married to American tenor Dominic Armstrong. They live in New York City.

== Filmography ==
Year	Film title	Role	Notes
2004	Black Nativity: In Concert – A Gospel Celebration	Self	Documentary
2009	The Metropolitan Opera HD Live	Giannetta / Papagena	TV series
2018	The Metropolitan Opera HD Live	Laura Fleet	TV series
