= Meeting the British =

Poem by Paul Muldoon

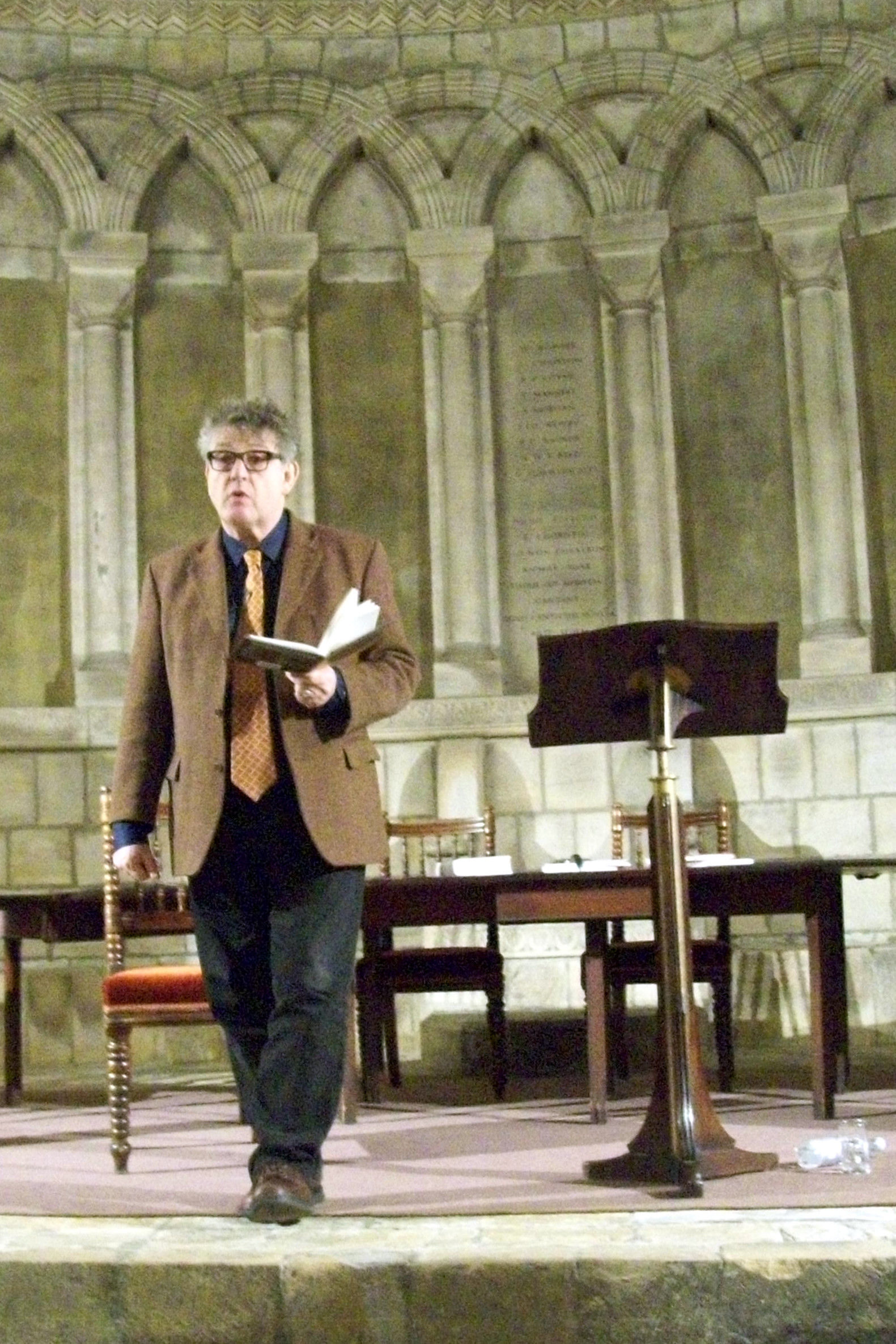
Paul Muldoon photographed in Durham, 2013.

Paul Muldoon's poem Meeting the British, first published in the 1987 collection of the same name, is an account of Pontiac's Rebellion of 1763 in the aftermath of the French and Indian War, presumably written from the perspective of a Native American.

The poem is thematically a post-colonial one that draws on stylistic aspects from the modernist tradition. Written in nine couplets, its language and structure operate on dual levels catering for both 'quick' readings that evoke direct feeling and more deliberated 'slow' readings, which in absorbing an historical sense deeper emphasises timeless temporal presence. Muldoon critic John Redmond suggests that the 'quick' and the 'slow' are 'the most desirable ' when considered together and in relation to one another.
