= New York Stories (opera) =

American 2010 opera

- Opera by Daron Hagen
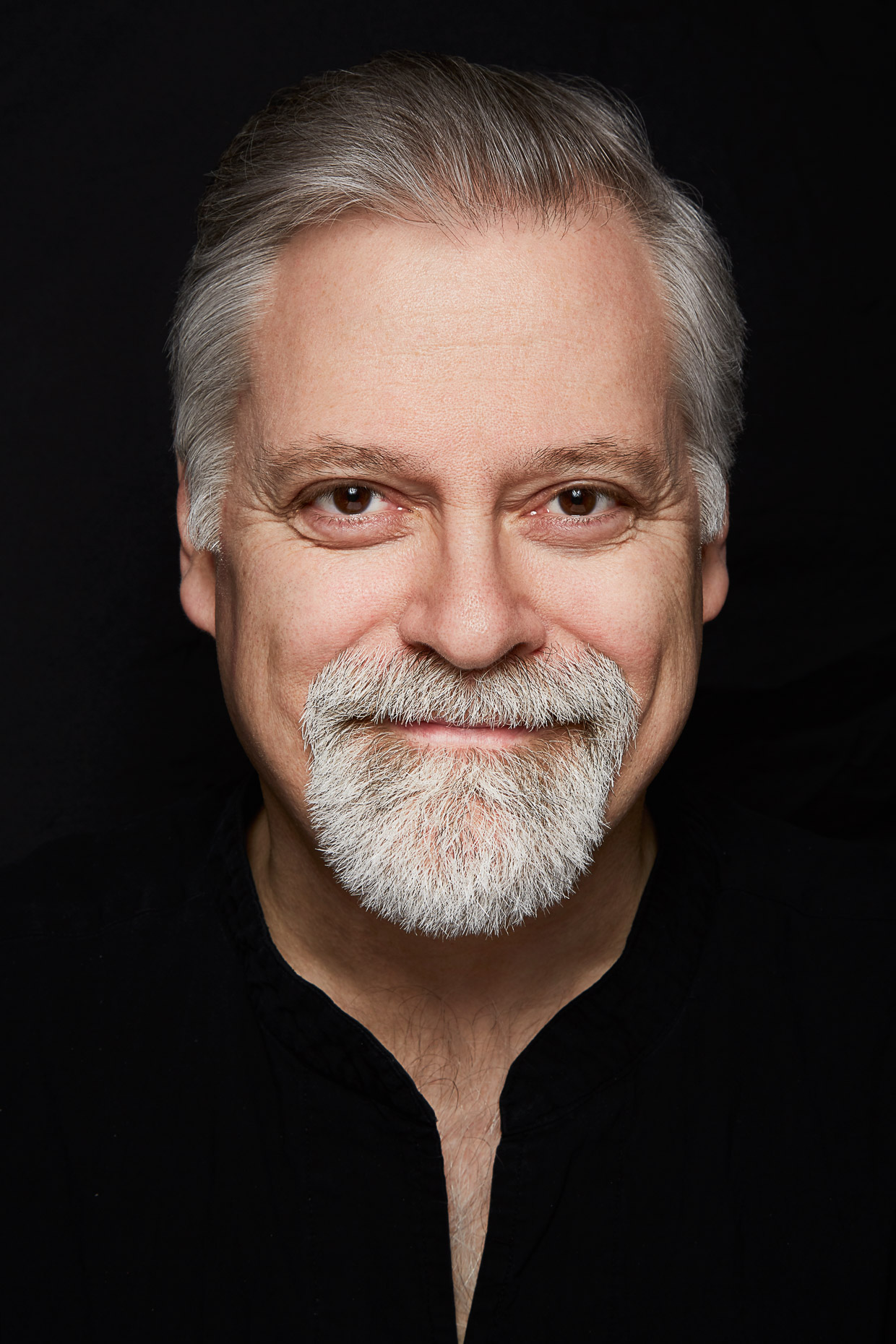
- Daron Hagen, the opera's composer
- Librettist: Daron Hagen; Barbara Grecki
- Language: English
- Premiere: October 30, 2010; Kentucky Opera, Louisville, Kentucky

New York Stories is a trilogy of English-language one-act operas (Broken Pieces, Just for the Night, and Cradle Song) by Daron Hagen, with a libretto by Hagen and Barbara Grecki first performed in its entirety by Kentucky Opera in Louisville, Kentucky, on 30 October 2010.

== Background and performance history ==
The operas are based on true stories. The first two skits originated as playlets by Barbara Grecki and were adapted by Hagen as he musicalized them. The third skit libretto is by Hagen and is a self-portrait of himself and spouse Gilda Lyons as new parents. "Hagen’s clever jabs at the state of contemporary classical music as the weary composers struggled with their fussy newborn made for a little inside humor." References are made by Hagen in the libretto to the couple's just having returned from a concert featuring music by Ned Rorem and David Del Tredici, among others. Later, the music quotes Elliott Carter's Third String Quartet and several measures of Rorem's artsong, "Early in the Morning".

Conceived both as a trilogy and as three free-standing skits, the first, Broken Pieces, is charming and romantic, the second, Just for the Night, is soulful and sad, and the third, Cradle Song, is warmly domestic and affectionate. The vocal demands of the three female and three male roles are designed for young artist training programs at professional opera companies and at universities. The composer has stipulated that staging in the theater is not preferable to recital, agitprop, site-specific stagings in private homes, schools, and public spaces. He has also stipulated that the trilogy may be cast with as few as two singers and as many as six, in addition to multiple casting. Each opera lasts approximately 20 minutes. Optional music is included in the score of the complete trilogy for a brief "pantomime prelude" and scene changes.

=== Broken Pieces ===
- Staged premiere: 8 March 2005, by the University of Southern California Opera, Los Angeles, California
- Concert orchestral premiere: 19 February 2007 by Music on the Edge, Pittsburgh, Pennsylvania
- Cabaret premiere: 13 February 2008 by Boston Opera Underground, Boston, Massachusetts

=== Just for the Night ===
- Concert premiere: 7 April 2008 by Prism Ensemble, New York, New York
- Semi-staged premiere: 17 June 2009 by Long Leaf Opera, Chapel Hill, North Carolina

=== Cradle Song ===
- Semi-staged premiere: 21 October 2008 by University of Puget Sound, Tacoma, Washington
- Concert premiere: 26 October 2008 by the Seasons Music Festival, Yakima, Washington

=== New York Stories (complete) ===
- Site-specific staged premiere: 30 October 2010 by Kentucky Opera, Louisville, Kentucky
- Semi-staged concert premiere: 1 November 2011 by Chicago Opera Theater / Chicago College of the Performing Arts, Chicago, Illinois
- Theatrical premiere: 24 February 2012 by the Butler Opera Center, University of Texas, Austin, Texas
- Theatrical premiere with complete orchestration: 13-14 February 2021 by Florida Grand Opera, Miami, Florida
- Hagen's New Mercury Collective is currently in pre-production for an "opera film" version of the trilogy, with filming set to begin in fall 2026.

== Roles ==
Role	Voice type	Site-specific premiere cast 30 October 2010	Semi-staged premiere cast 1 November 2011	Theatrical premiere cast 24 February 2012
Producer		Kentucky Opera	Chicago Opera Theater / Chicago; College of the Performing Arts	Butler Opera Center
Music Director		Joey Mechavich	Scott Gilmore	Richard Masters
Director(s)		Daron Hagen	Joanie Schults	David Radames Toro / Lance Hargis / Joshua T. Miller
Pamela	soprano	Andrea Shokery	Louise Rogan	Dorea Cook / Andrea Ramos
Antonio	baritone / tenor	Gabriel Preisser	Loren Battieste	Eun Deuk Cho / Daniel Madrid
Babs	soprano	Brandy Hawkins	Catheryn Shuman	Amelia Ciskey / Mari Stoner
Chip	baritone / tenor	Daniel Anderson	Matthew Newlin	Jake Jacobsen
Mama	soprano	Erin Keesy	Megan Williams	Courtney Nance / Nataly Wickham
Papa	baritone / tenor	Ricky Case	Drew Ladd	Tim Petty

== Synopsis ==
=== Broken Pieces ===
Pamela lives alone with her cat on the Upper West Side of Manhattan. Antonio, an Italian immigrant, arrives to fix the tiles in her bathroom. They share their stories and a romantic moment.

=== Just for the Night ===
Christmas Eve on Manhattan's Upper East Side. Middle-aged Babs is surprised by a visit from her brother Chip who, it emerges, has been living in a shelter. When he asks to stay the night, she turns him away.

=== Cradle Song ===
A married composer couple, Mama and Papa, live in Hamilton Heights. They arrive home after a night on the town and unsuccessfully attempt to put their child down for the night.
