= North Cheshire Wind Orchestra =

The North Cheshire Wind Orchestra (NCWO) is a symphonic wind orchestra based in Warrington, England.

The membership of around 40 players is drawn from throughout the North West of England, many of whom travel considerable distances to rehearsals. Whilst a number of members make their living from music, the group is essentially non-professional.

Over the last 5 years the NCWO has developed to the point where it is now regarded as one of the finest ensembles of its type in the UK. In April 2006 the NCWO was honoured to give the European premiere of Daron Hagen's opera Bandanna, along with soloists from the Royal Northern College of Music and the Manchester Chamber Choir, in the presence of the composer.

The NCWO have regular success in the National Concert Band Festival at both regional and national level, including consecutive Gold Awards at the 2004 and 2005 National finals. The NCWO is also a member of Making Music - the National Federation of Music Societies.

In November 2002 the orchestra performed at the opening celebrations for Pyramid, Warrington’s new arts centre. The concert included the premiere of a new work commissioned for the occasion by the Irish composer, Fergal Carroll. In October 2003 the NCWO launched a concert season at Pyramid which has established a regular base for the orchestra.

A wide range of music is performed by the group, although there is a particular commitment to music written for the modern wind orchestra in the past 30 years. The organisation is now noted for its adventurous programming and has taken part in several commissioning projects.

This interest in commissioning and performing new music was an important factor in the decision of the Arts Council of England in May 2000 to award the NCWO over £21,000 of National Lottery funding towards the purchase of new instruments.
