= Orson Rehearsed =

2021 film/opera by Daron Hagen

- Directed by: Daron Hagen
- Written by: Daron Hagen
- Produced by: Burning Sled Media; Chicago College of Performing Arts
- Starring: Robert Orth; Robert Frankenberry; Omar Mulero; Fifth House Ensemble
- Edited by: Daron Hagen
- Music by: Daron Hagen
- Production company: The New Mercury Collective
- Release date: February 2, 2021
- Running time: 62 minutes
- Country: United States
- Language: English

Orson Rehearsed is a 2021 American independent film by Daron Hagen about Orson Welles which combines elements of opera film, documentary film, and Surrealist cinema. The narrative follows a 2018 staged production of Hagen's eleventh opera integrating extensive pre-shot films and electro-acoustic tracks in which, poised in the bardo between life and death on the night of his demise, Welles takes stock of his life. Directed by Hagen based on his own screenplay and musical score, the film was produced by Burning Sled Media and the Chicago College of Performing Arts. It stars Robert Orth, Robert Frankenberry, and Omar Mulero as Welles, and features the Fifth House Ensemble.

Hagen began the screenplay in 2016 as a collection of 52 dramatic beats featuring Welles and Marlene Dietrich, John Houseman, Paola Mori, Rita Hayworth, and Marc Blitzstein set to original music by Hagen and words fashioned by Hagen from William Shakespeare and Welles' own public domain comments. Conceived simultaneously as a live operas (in various dramaturgical configurations) and a film that is an artwork in itself that folds the live performance into a larger vision, in spring 2018 Hagen pared down the 52 beats to 14 which centered on the character of Welles divided into three avatars—one young, one middle aged, and one on the night of his death.

During 2016–17, Hagen shot and edited three sets of 14 60-minute films for projection over the heads of the onstage Orsons in live performance. Hagen directed the staged premiere of Orson Rehearsed at the Studebaker Theatre in the Fine Arts Building (Chicago) in September 2018 in a staging designed to work in the theater but also to provide the shots mapped out in the 2016 storyboards. From 2018 to 2020, he edited the musical soundtrack and folded the onstage films into footage of the staged premiere while adding another layer of semi-opaque images carrying a narrative unique to the film.

The film was released on February 2, 2021, although a traditional art release has been delayed because of COVID-19, it has received substantial positive attention at film festivals worldwide, receiving laurels for Best Musical Score, Best Composer, Best Director, and Best Editing.

== Plot ==
10 October 1985. Hollywood, California. Orson Welles' heart has just stopped. We enter his mind in this moment, on the threshold between life and death. In the liminal zone between life and death, Welles' thoughts flow as a stream of consciousness that loops back on itself, like a Möbius strip. Those thoughts are articulated by three avatars: the first represents the past, the memory of his youthful wunderkind self; the second represents his vestigial self-image as a swashbuckling mid-career artist, bemused to be crumpled on the floor in his bathrobe, dying; the last, represents his spirit, out of time—what Heidegger called an ecstace. On its face, the audience is presented with a series of essays about how opera and film overlap. The relationship between a man and the roles that he has played is examined—Falstaff, Othello, Brutus, Ahab, Kane, Quinlin (from Touch of Evil), and himself.

In stream of consciousness dramatic beats, he first surveys his relationship to the works of Shakespeare, then revisits the accidental drowning of Manoel Olimpio Meira during the filming of It's All True. He contemplates the sound of his own heart; and then lashes out, reliving the pain of his repeated loss of creative control in the editing of The Magnificent Ambersons. He recalls Marc Blitzstein at the piano the night that The Cradle Will Rock debuted before rolling into a rollicking remembrance of the high-octane life he led, reliving the giddy joy of careening across Manhattan in a rented ambulance (to better cut through traffic) at the top of his game on his way from a Danton's Death rehearsal to the War of the Worlds radio broadcast.

His thoughts turn to his despair at the recutting of Touch of Evil, which he repurposes in imagination as the realization that he is dying. He thinks back a few hours to his appearance that afternoon on The Merv Griffin Show, imagining himself as a manic marionette dancing for others’ amusement—the humiliation in having started at the top with Citizen Kane and having ended up doing wine commercials. He contemplates the solitary nature of existence before recalling his eighth birthday—the last time that he saw his mother. He asserts that his life's greatest mistake was that, when his mother asked him to make a wish before blowing out the candles on his birthday cake, he forgot.

He repurposes Shakespeare's great Falstaff credo as he mulls over Chimes at Midnight and the role of love: Maybe I did forget, he closes, poignantly, before having a vision of Rita Hayworth and singing a tender paean to domesticity and fatherhood. A passionate social activist, Welles' last thoughts are of the future: with the foresight available only to the dead, he mourns his country as the words of a xenophobic reality television president are intercut with Emma Lazarus' hymn to liberty. But the body gives out even though the spirit is still willing: it is no longer Welles' problem, it is ours. The avatars join in a secular hymn: Our songs will all be silenced, they sing, but what of it? Go on singing. Go on. Go. And he does. We do.

== Cast ==
- Omar Mulero as Orson Welles #1
- Robert Frankenberry as Orson Welles #2
- Robert Orth as Orson Welles #3

== Music ==
The soundtrack documents what audience members heard seated in the theater during the live performance of the score. Accordingly, the extensive electro-acoustic tracks crafted by Hagen are blended with the singers and the live instruments onstage performed by the Fifth House Ensemble. This stable soundscape was very lightly enhanced during post-production mastering, and the film edited to the soundtrack. The Naxos Records May 2021 release represents a hybrid of cast and soundtrack recording sound worlds.

== Reception ==
Fanfare magazine noted, "Hagen's ability to meld a multiplicity of expressive devices into a coherent, expressive, and convincing whole is magnificent. Linking passages between scenes, to underline the dream-like stream of consciousness, are masterly, transitions seamless." "The collage of ragtime, synth effects and post-romantic arioso engages," admits Steph Power in a two-star review, while David Denton writes, "Do please hear Orson Rehearsed as a major contribution to 21st century music theatre." [A] "dramatically compelling one-acter ... [set] in a compelling sound world," wrote Kevin Filipsky. "This kind of approach with the potential to overwhelm an opera's subject and its audience. But the combination of Orson Rehearsed's brevity and Hagen's unerring sense of pacing wins the day. The cumulative effect is of a very individual, fascinating, and thought-provoking view of a life that was as influential as it was flawed." American Record Guide noted, "I found this to be a thoroughly enjoyable opera ... in a highly dramatic idiom."

== Awards ==
Awards
Year	Award	Category	Result
2020	Los Angeles Motion Picture Festival	Best Composer; Best Director; Best Poster Art; Best Music Video Concept; Best Music Track; Best Musical Performance; Best Score	Won
2020	Montreal Independent Film Festival	November Award - Best Composer	Won
2020	LA Indies Festival	Best Composer	Won
2020	Los Angeles Film Awards	October Award - Best Musical/Dance Film	Honorable Mention
2021	Toronto Film Channel Awards	November Award - Best Composer	Won
2021	New York Independent Cinema Awards	February Award - Best Director	Won
2021	Austin International Art Festival	June Award - Best US Feature Film; Best Music in a Feature Film; Best Editing in a Feature Film	Won
2020	American Golden Picture International Film Festival	October Award - Best Score; Composer; Best Editor	Won
2021	4th Dimension International Film Festival	Best Experimental Feature	Won
2021	Toronto Film and Script Awards	May 2021 Award - Best Experimental Feature	Won
2020	Blue Ridge Film Festival	Best Experimental Feature	Won
2020	United States Film Festival	March 2020 Award - Best Feature Film USA	Won
2020	New Wave Short Film Festival	December 2020 Award - Best Film Score	Won
2020	Logcinema Music Film Festival	December 2020 Award - Best Film Soundtrack on Any Subject	Won
2021	Atlanta Award-Qualifying Film Festival	Festival Award - Best Music Film	Won
2021	Vancouver Independent Film Festival	Winter 2021 Award - Best Music in a Feature Film	Won
2021	The Oaks International Film Festival	Best Musical Score	Won
2020	Golden Valley Global Cinefest	Best Postmodern Film	Won
2020	Chicago Indie Film Awards	November Award - Best US and International Composer	Won
2021	Mindfield Film Festival	March/April Awards - Diamond Award for Best Original Score; Diamond Award for Best Director; Platinum Award for Best Sound Design	Won
2021	Global Music Awards	Silver Medal - Original Score / Soundtrack	Won
2021	EdiPlay International Film Festival	May Award - Best Original Music	Finalist
2021	Seoul International Short Film Festival	January Award - Best Film Score	Finalist
2020	Lonely Wolf International Film Festival	December Award - Best Live-Recorded Theatre Film	Finalist
2021	Beyond the Curve International Film Festival	May Award - Best Original Music	Finalist
2021	Prague International Monthly Film Festival	Best Original Music	Finalist
2021	Worldfest-Houston International Film Festival	Performing Arts Film	Finalist
2021	Phoenix Shorts	Best Original Score; Best Composer	Semi-Finalist
2020	Madras Independent Film Festival	December Award - Best Feature Film	Special Mention
2021	Milan Gold Awards	Winter 2021 Award - Best Musical Score	Special Mention
2020	Tokyo International Short Film Festival	November 2020 Award - Best Film Score	Honorable Mention
2020	Global Film Festival Awards	September 2020 Award - Best Original Score	Special Mention
2021	Hyderabad International Film Festival	Best Music and Sound Design	Finalist
2021	Swedish International Film Festival	May–June 2021 Award - Best Original Music; Best Film Editor	Won
