= A Woman in Morocco =

Opera

- Opera by Daron Hagen
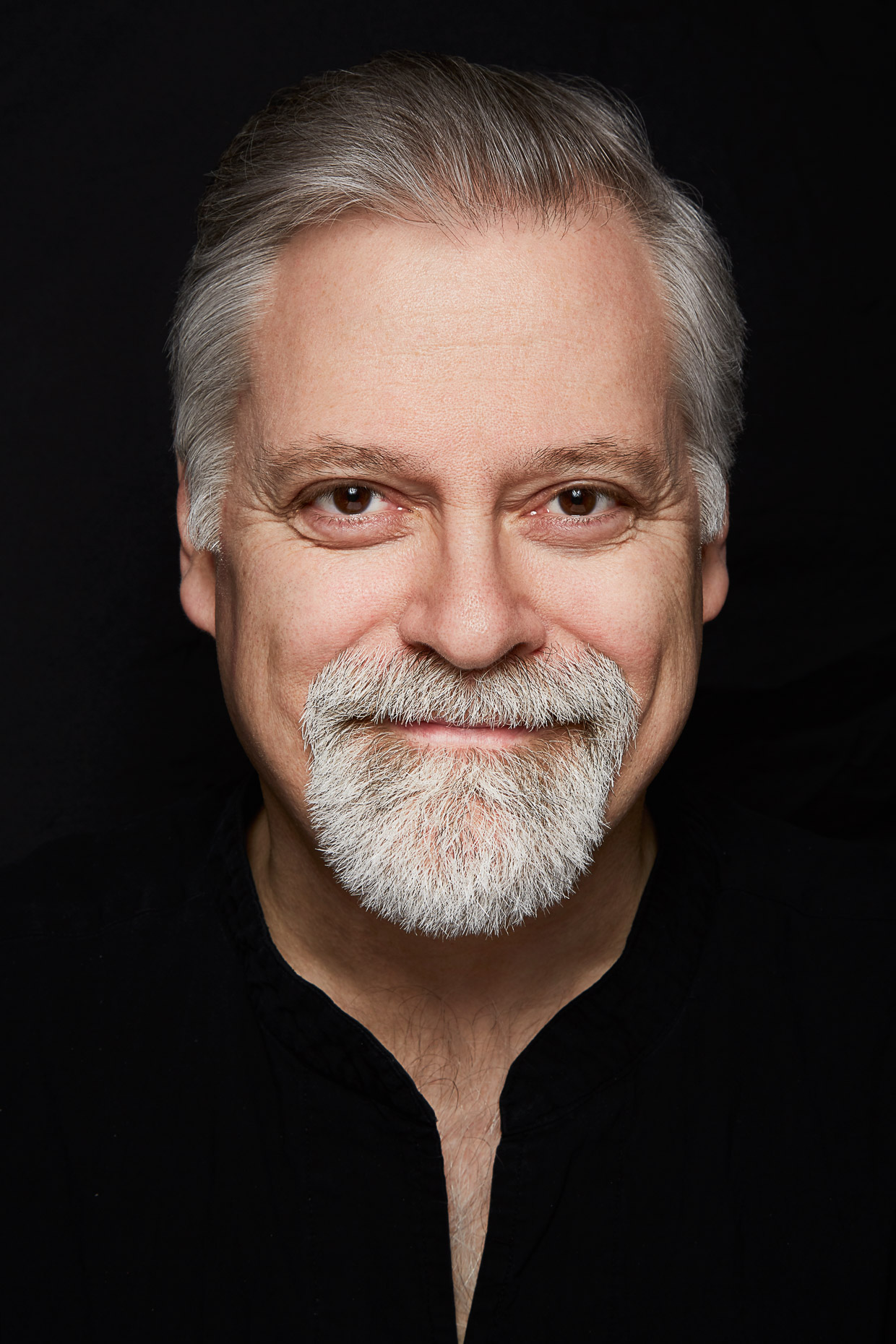
- Daron Hagen, the opera's composer
- Librettist: Daron Hagen; Barbara Grecki
- Language: English
- Premiere: June 23, 2015; Kentucky Opera, Actors Theatre, Louisville, Kentucky

A Woman in Morocco is an English language opera in two acts composed by Daron Hagen and based on an unperformed play by Barbara Grecki. It was premiered by Kentucky Opera in Louisville, Kentucky, June 23, 2015, in a production directed by the composer. The libretto is by Hagen and Grecki, who also co-wrote the treatment. The story, set in Tangier in October 1958, concerns the disappearance of an American investigative journalist named Lizzy Holmes working on an exposé of sex trafficking. The work received a complete workshop staging at the Butler Opera Center of the Sarah and Ernest Butler School of Music at the University of Texas-Austin October 25, 2013.

"Anywhere humans interact one can find people capable of exploiting the weak, the powerless, and the vulnerable," explained the composer in a 2015 interview. "The scourge of human trafficking manifests in even more forms than immediately come to mind: any time someone is coerced or manipulated into doing something that they know is wrong out of fear for their own safety, or that of their loved ones, trafficking is occurring. I wrote this opera to raise peoples’ awareness of that face, to fight, in the way that I know best, for trafficking victims."

== Development history ==
Following a table read directed by Alan Hicks by actors at Center City Opera in Philadelphia, the opera was given a staged workshop on October 25, 27 and November 1,3, 2013 by the Sarah and Ernest Butler Opera Center, Austin, Texas. The performances were conducted by Kelly Kuo with stage direction by Robert DeSimone. The world premiere production was performed on May 15, 16, and 17, 2015, by the Kentucky Opera at the Jory Theater of the Actors' Theatre of Louisville, Louisville, Kentucky as a centerpiece of the 20th Annual Festival of Faiths. Roger Zahab conducted the 10-piece ensemble from the Kentucky Opera Orchestra; the production was directed by Daron Hagen who also designed the sets.

Daron Hagen's seven-episode video blog chronicling the development of the opera from first sketches through the final professional premiere over a four year period offers an glimpse into the composer-librettist-director's process.

== Critical reaction ==
While in its college workshop production at the University of Texas, the characters were felt by one graduate student to "come across as flat and largely unsympathetic and so frustratingly spineless that it's hard to care about them," when the work was given its professional premiere by Kentucky Opera, professional critics noted that "[its] complex score works to underline issues with leitmotifs, musical cues assigned to different characters, and music that never settles or rests. When singers get soaring arias, they emerge naturally from this intricate texture. Hagen has a gift for writing sensually rich tunes and uses this skill to release the music at important moments." Most of the universally positive reviews touched approvingly on the opera's subject matter:

Will [a new opera] find a connection with tradition while creating something fresh and timely? I believe that composer Daron Hagen and his co-librettist Barbara Grecki have [done this] with their new two-act opera. ... Hagen's score feelingly captures the deep contradictions of its story and its characters in music that evokes the beauty and mystery of an exotic landscape, the dangerous and deceptive sensuality of its inhabitants, and the intense violence that is always just beneath the surface of a culture that threatens and terrorizes women.

== Roles ==
Role	Voice type	Workshop cast 25 October 2013 (Conductor: Kelly Kuo)	World premiere cast 15 May 2015 (Conductor: Roger Zahab)
Lizzy Holmes / Woman #4	soprano	Natalie Cummings	Danielle Connelly
Asilah / Woman #1	soprano	Samantha Leibowitz	Erin K. Bryan
Clare Holmes / Woman #3	mezzo-soprano	Olivia Douglas	Mimi Melisa Bonetti
Ahmed	tenor	Soonchan Kwan	Joe Shadday
Teddy Forsythe	baritone	Austin Bradley	Joseph Flaxman
Harry Hopkins	bass-baritone	Chance Eakin	Brent Michael Smith
Habiba / Woman #2	mute / soprano		Natasha Lynn Foley
Trafficked Woman / Woman #5	mute / mezzo-soprano		Krista Heckman

== Synopsis ==
The action takes place in Tangier, Morocco, at the pension Cypress during October 1958. "The story follows the path of a naive young American reporter, Lizzy Holmes, who goes to Morocco to write about the status of women. Becoming involved with the shady inhabitants of her hotel, she discovers the insidious world of those who deal in buying and selling young girls for profit. Hampered by her own seduction into relationships she doesn't fully understand and sinking into drug addiction, Lizzy becomes a victim herself."

=== Prologue ===
In the Cypress' courtyard, the maître d'hôtel, a charismatic Moroccan in his late 20s named Ahmed sips tea while musing about his life and listening to the radio.

=== Act 1 ===
Teddy Forsythe, a British expatriate in his late 40s, owner of the Cypress, ushers in Lizzy Holmes, an American investigative journalist in her early 20s. Alone in her room, she writes a letter to her sister Clare. Ahmed delivers water; there is an immediate attraction. Asilah, an intellectually inquisitive Arab woman working as a maid, delivers linens; Lizzy gives her a book of poetry to read.

A few days later, in the Courtyard, Lizzy accidentally witnesses an abduction (and possible murder) of Asilah's sister Habiba by Teddy and an American businessman named Harry Hopkins. Shoved by the men to the ground, she doesn't see their faces. Blood on her hands, she returns to her room to read poetry with Asilah, who relates her sister's story. Lizzy vows to expose the men's activities.

The next morning, Ahmed delivers breakfast to Lizzy's room; they impulsively kiss, smoke kief together and begin an affair.

The next evening, Teddy arrives to escort Lizzy to dinner. He muses on a woman's role in Morocco and surprises Lizzy by returning the book that she gave Asilah, revealing that her husband—Ahmed—forbids her to read.

Angry and humiliated at having learned that she had unknowingly begun an affair with a married man, Lizzy drinks too much at dinner. Ahmed tells Teddy that their love affair is over. Asilah reveals to Lizzy that she herself has been trafficked. Ahmed begs Lizzy to help him save Asilah from being trafficked again. Teddy arrives and announces that he has a plan to make Asilah "disappear." Asilah is murdered.

=== Act 2 ===
Clare Holmes arrives at the Cypress a few days later with Harry Hopkins looking for her sister. Teddy tells her that Lizzy left weeks before.

Lizzy is revealed in her room. Ahmed has addicted her to drugs. In the hotel bar, Teddy agrees, for a price, to find Harry's "little Arab"—Asilah.

Later that night, Teddy and Ahmed induce heavily sedated Lizzy to don a jellaba, and spirit her away, probably to her death.

Later still, Ahmed and Teddy are revealed in bed. As an expression of love for Ahmed, Teddy signs ownership of the Cypress over to him. Ahmed puts a knife to Harry's throat. Teddy grabs it and plunges it into Harry's chest.

=== Epilogue ===
A few days later, Teddy is in jail for the murder of Harry, and Ahmed is revealed reading the volume of poetry Lizzy gave Asilah. Clare, still looking for her sister, notices that Ahmed is wearing her sister's scarf, and asks him for his help in finding her. He presents her with the scarf and departs; she is left deciding whether or not to accompany him.
