= Vera of Las Vegas =

American 2003 opera

- Opera by Daron Hagen
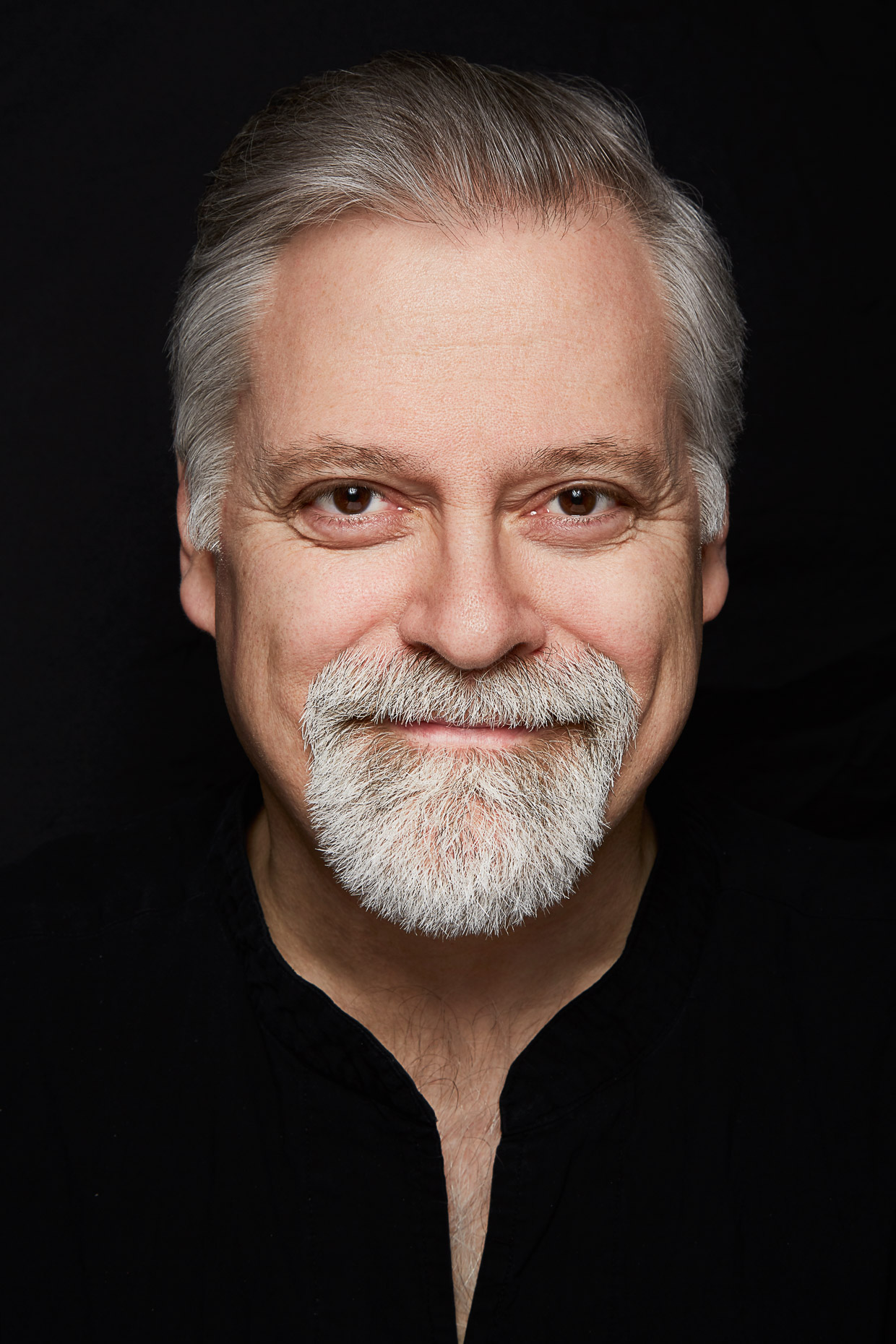
- Daron Hagen, the opera's composer
- Librettist: Paul Muldoon
- Language: English
- Premiere: June 25, 2003; Center for Contemporary Opera, New York City

Vera of Las Vegas is an opera by Daron Hagen with a libretto by Paul Muldoon based on a treatment co-written with the composer. It is Hagen's second opera, after Shining Brow. The Center for Contemporary Opera gave the staged premiere on 25 June 2003 at the Leonard Nimoy Thalia Theatre of Symphony Space in New York City.

== Background and premiere ==
Hagen and Muldoon, after the 1993 success of their first opera Shining Brow, determined to create a three-act opera called Grand Concourse. Although the opera Vera of Las Vegas is published separately and may be performed as a freestanding work, the three-act opera is still considered a "work in progress" by the authors. The first act (in 2010 still awaiting adaptation by Hagen) was to be based on Muldoon's pre-existing play (originally commissioned and produced by McCarter Theatre, Princeton) Six Honest Serving Men. The second act was to be Vera of Las Vegas, with a co-written treatment by Muldoon and Hagen based on characters introduced in the first act. Hagen and Muldoon co-wrote a detailed treatment for Grand Concourse. The final act was set to take place on 9-11. In 2010, it awaits a libretto by Muldoon and musical completion by Hagen.

The School of Music at the University of Nevada, Las Vegas (as a showcase for its faculty and opera program) commissioned Vera of Las Vegas in 1995. Since the work was to be the centerpiece of a trilogy, Hagen elected to make a live recording rather than authorize a staged premiere. It was recorded to 24 tracks in March 1996 at the Artemus W. Ham Concert Hall in Las Vegas. Hagen, at the Bard College Electronic Music Studio in April–May 1996, oversaw post-production mixing, editing and recording of extensive overdubs, performing many of them. After final mastering in New York in June 2003, the opera gained the distinction of being the final release of Composers Recordings, Inc. As such, it received no publicity, was not shipped to stores, and was not reviewed. Nevertheless, the first pressing sold out within nine months, partly due to the fact that Carl Fischer Music, the publisher of the music, included the recording as part of the published vocal score. Although available as part of the Database of Recorded American Music and as a print-to-order item in the New World Records catalogue, physical copies of the actual release are extremely rare.

Hagen conceived of the title role specifically for countertenor Charles Maxwell, who recorded it. American drag artist and playwright Shequida performed the role for its world premiere. The first non-African-American to sing the role was Jonathan Peter Kenny, in Opera Theatre Company's European premiere and Irish tour during November–December 2006.

== Performance history ==
Originally scored by Hagen for 22-player "big band plus strings" and recorded in that version, Hagen reduced the instrumentation to quartet (piano / synthesizer; reeds; bass; drums) for its New York production, cut some of the "Wedding Chapel Chorus", added minimal underscoring, and bows music. It is in this version that the opera is most frequently revived. In 2011, Hagen made a Kleine Mahagonny (10 player, similar to Weill/Brechts Little Mahagonny / Rise and Fall of the City of Mahagonny) version for the West Coast premiere by Berkely West Edge Opera.

== Roles ==
Roles, voice types, premiere casts
Role	Voice type	Original recording 8 March 1996 "Full Vegas" version Conductor: Donna Hagen Las Vegas	Staged premiere 25 June 2003 "Thalia" version Piano/conductor: Robert Frankenberry New York City	First European tour 29 April 2006 "Thalia" version Piano/conductor: David Brophy Dublin, Ireland	West Coast premiere 29 July 2012 "Kleine Vera" version Conductor: Jonathan Khuner San Francisco
Vera Loman	countertenor	Charles Maxwell	Shequida	Jonathan Peter Kenny	Brian Asawa
Doll Common	soprano	Carolann Page	Patricia Dell	Charlotte Page	Heidi Moss Sali
Dumdum Devine	baritone	Paul Kreider	Elem Eley	Alan Fairs	Paul Murray
Taco Bell	tenor	Patrick Jones	Dillon McCartney	Eugene Ginty	Thomas Glenn
Catchalls	treble chorus				
Trench, Trilby	mute		Rebekkah Ross, Lisa Hargus	Bridget Knowles, Elizabeth Woods	

== Synopsis ==
"On one level, the opera ... concerns a journey to the center of modern America ("center" is a word that gets bandied about a lot in Vera, and undermined). It is a place of materialism, greed, mechanical pleasures and phony appearances, an alienating labyrinth in which the Irish travelers become lost and transformed. To this extent, the book hints at allegiance with Hunter S. Thompson's nightmare novel, Fear and Loathing in Las Vegas, another phantasmagoric journey to the heart of darkness. Early on, in reply to Dumdum's remark "the heart of America", Taco responds, "built of sand". Yet, the opera announces its origins in the nightmare of Northern Ireland's Troubles by repeated references to Ulster place names, horrid flashbacks to obscure scenes of murder. The flashbacks revolve around the brutal killing of Dessie Gillespie, to which Taco confesses towards the close, writes Jonathan Allison. "This 'nightmare cabaret opera' extends Six Honest Serving Men and implies a way, through conscience and 'something like a confession', to a point where things might begin to become more clear." reads the dust jacket of the libretto.

=== Scene 1 ===
Taco, a forty-five-year-old man, originally from Northern Ireland, illegally living in the Bronx and driving a cab, is in an interrogation center somewhere in Northern Ireland. Two heavies, Trench and Trilby, take turns slapping him around. As he slips into unconsciousness the sound of his own breathing, the blood rushing in his ears, and an airplane landing announce his dream's beginning: he dreams that he and his friend Dumdum Devine (also forty-five and living illegally in the Bronx, where he tends bar) have just arrived in Las Vegas. They are between planes. Doll Common, a forty-five-year-old woman, formerly a blackjack dealer, now an undercover agent for the Immigration and Naturalization Service, is costumed as a stewardess. She invites them to meet her pal, Vera Loman. She could be "your Girl Friday, or more", she teases.

=== Scene 2 ===
Taco and Dumdum meet Vera at the Forum Shops. Trench and Trilby shadow them. Doll suggests they go to a casino called the Hippolyta.

=== Scene 3 ===
Dealers sing about their customers. Vera wins big at the slots. We learn back stories—especially Vera's: Trench and Trilby may have been sent by one of her assignations, a corrupt judge she's suing for aggravated assault. The four slip off to a stripper bar called the Delphine.

=== Scene 4 ===
Taco and Vera slip off as the strippers sing of their lot. He returns, rattled: Vera's not what she seemed. "You wouldn't have missed it", says Dumdum, "if you'd seen The Crying Game." Doll's fallen for Dumdum, and has decided not to pursue the two of them for being illegally on American soil. The two couples head for a wedding chapel to make it official.

=== Scene 5 ===
Trench and Trilby lurk. A canned chorus sings bromides. Vera sings a torch song about her past. Vera proclaims that she has a solution. "I'll rip up my card so that it says 'Vera Loman LAPD' instead of LAPDANCER. That will scare them off." She confronts Trench and Trilby, who flee. Taco, just as he is about to plight his troth to Vera, slumps to his knees. Seconds later, he is back in Northern Ireland. He confesses to a grisly assassination. Vera wails into the night, "Where's my Taco Bell?"

== Aesthetic ==
In an interview with John Clare, Hagen described the opera's score as "[Walking] the fine line between pastiche and inspiration. It is meant to sound as though the music is wildly postmodern, even self-indulgently "out of control." This effect could only be achieved through painstaking technical procedures that are, if anything, distinctly modernist." In the liner notes to the recording, Russell Platt describes the authors' creative chemistry: "When joined, each artist's singular complexity complements the other's. If Muldoon's tone can seem cool, then Hagen's music can turn up the heat; if Muldoon's words sometimes distract us with their dazzle, Hagen's passionate sounds magnify the human element." In a preface to the vocal score, Hagen writes, "The musical score shifts style from moment to moment while, at a deeper level, the entire affair unfolds from a single D–A–B-flat melodic motive grafted to a rhythmic cell. The intentionally Technicolor, superficially-tawdry, seemingly raw, decadent musical eclecticism runs in febrile counterpoint to the libretto's verbal flights." In the same preface, Muldoon responds, "What has made working with Daron Hagen such a pleasure is the extent to which he understands the possibilities for tripping the light fantastic on the coal-carriage of a runaway train. Or, again, what seems to be a runaway train."

== Critical response ==
=== European critics ===
European critics responded enthusiastically to Opera Theatre Company's premiere and Irish tour: "Hagen’s music ... blends idioms — neo-Gershwin, jazz, soft rock, Broadway — with soaring melodies that send the characters looping off in arias of self-revelation. He has a gift for pastiche and musical surrealism as well as a distinctive voice for moments where words and music coincide.” “[Hagen has] taken a polyglot approach to the music, and written it as a kind of mood-identifying background, sometimes in keeping with the words, but often deliriously, hilariously at odds with them, though in a way that manages to highlight them without undermining them. It's quite a clever ploy”, writes Michael Dervan.

=== American critics ===
American critics also responded positively to the off-Broadway premiere: “The eclecticism of the music is dazzling: sharply pointed jazz lines are overlaid with slippery atonal harmony; a plaintive nineteen-seventies folk-rock ballad melds into a Broadway power anthem. Paul Muldoon’s libretto is a marvel of virtuosic wordplay, exuberant, unsettling, and heroic by turns.” Designating the New York premiere as the magazine's "Pick of the Week", Time Out New York described it as "a gutsy, occasionally trashy cabaret opera”. “You cannot deny the theatrical audacity of Vera of Las Vegas, which elicited many cheers from the packed house", admitted The New York Times. Charles Ward, in the Houston Chronicle, describes the central arias as "very handsome, large-scale versions of sophisticated songs in the Great American Songbook". “Mr. Hagen’s music suits the style of the libretto perfectly. The idiom is very much 'Broadway', with references to many kinds of pop music, handled masterfully. The music is tuneful and rhythmically sophisticated, the words set clearly. Much of the music comes in short bursts of a phrase or two which almost interrupt each other in rapid succession, except for two long arias, one for Doll and one for Vera, which are quite successful in projecting a long lyric line. Altogether the opera is a musical tour de force.” “From the Bernstein-like brashness of the opening bits to Doll's slow pop-ballad aria to Vera's eleventh-hour-save torch song, Hagen (rather self-consciously) goes for broke. And his obvious affinity for Muldoon's wacky, all-over-the-map text, leads to a seamless marriage of words and music, even if the libretto, at times, is too poetically clever for its own good.”
