= The Antient Concert =

American 2007 opera

- Opera by Daron Hagen
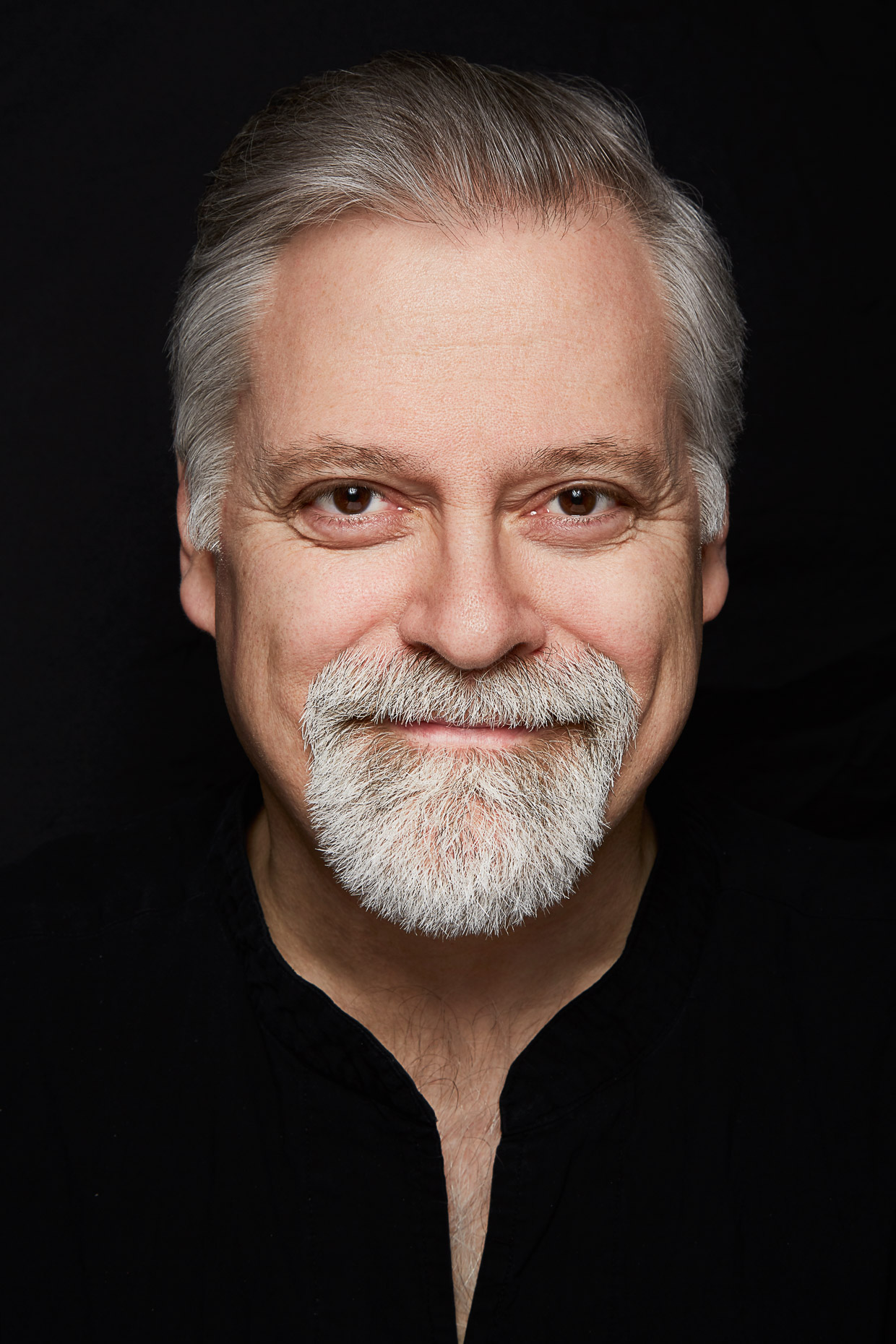
- Daron Hagen, the opera's composer
- Librettist: Paul Muldoon
- Language: English
- Premiere: November 6, 2007; Century Center for the Performing Arts, New York City

The Antient Concert is a sixty-minute-long English language opera in one act by Daron Hagen with a libretto by Paul Muldoon. Hagen describes it as a "dramatic recital for four singers".

== Background and performance history ==
Hagen and Muldoon developed the opera as part of the Princeton Atelier at Princeton University. The process culminated in Hagen conducting the Borromeo String Quartet and student performers at the McCarter Theatre in a fully staged workshop production directed by five student directors. After serving as the centerpiece of the 16 June 2007 "26th Annual Bloomsday on Broadway" at Symphony Space in New York City (during which it was broadcast live on WNYC and streamed on the Internet), it had its staged world premiere, directed by the composer, on 6 November 2007 in New York City. Hagen's fourth and final opera with Muldoon, Hagen has described it as "our slender Capriccio", and "a story about the collision of words, music, performance, sex, death, and nationalism".

Chronology

- Princeton Atelier staged workshop (7 April 2005), The Princeton Atelier, McCarter Theater, Princeton, New Jersey
- Concert broadcast premiere (16 June 2007), Bloomsday on Broadway XXVI, Peter Sharp Theater, Symphony Space, New York City
- Staged world premiere (6 November 2007), The Phoenix Players, Century Center for the Performing Arts, New York City

== Roles ==
Role	Voice type	Staged workshop McCarter Theater, Princeton 17 April 2005	Concert broadcast premiere Symphony Space, New York 16 June 2007	Staged premiere The Century, New York 6 November 2007
Music Director		Daron Hagen	Daron Hagen	Daron Hagen
Director(s)		Princeton Atelier Students	Daron Hagen	Daron Hagen
Performer(s)		Borromeo String Quartet	Jocelyn Dueck	Jocelyn Dueck
James Joyce	lyric baritone	Matthew Bernier	Elem Eley	Elem Eley
John McCormack	tenor	Sean Effinger-Dean	James Demler	James Demler
Nora Barnacle	soprano	Molly Ephraim	Gilda Lyons	Gilda Lyons
May Joyce	mezzo-soprano	Margaret Meyer	Elaine Valby	Elaine Valby

== Synopsis ==
The Antient Concert revolves around the reputed showdown in the 1904 Feis Ceoil between John McCormack and James Joyce. "It took place on 27 August 1904 in the Antient Concert Rooms in Dublin, Ireland. Legend has it that they competed that night in the Tenor singing competition. There is no documentary evidence of this; however, Joyce did win the Bronze Medal that year (it is said that he did not agree with the stipulation that competitors demonstrate their musicianship by doing some sight-reading, and left the stage). Many believe it was McCormack's 1903 win of the Gold Medal that launched his career." The musical score consists of variations on five traditional Irish ballads, the libretto of variations on the lyrics of those ballads. The five songs referenced are: "Salley Gardens", "The Harp that Once", "You're as Welcome as the Flowers in May", "Tho' the Last Glimpse of Erin", and "The Croppy Boy". "Consequently," wrote Hagen, "throughout the recital, the characters shift between 'performance mode' and the expression of their internal thoughts."
