= Amelia (opera) =

American 2010 opera by Daron Hagen

- Opera by Daron Hagen
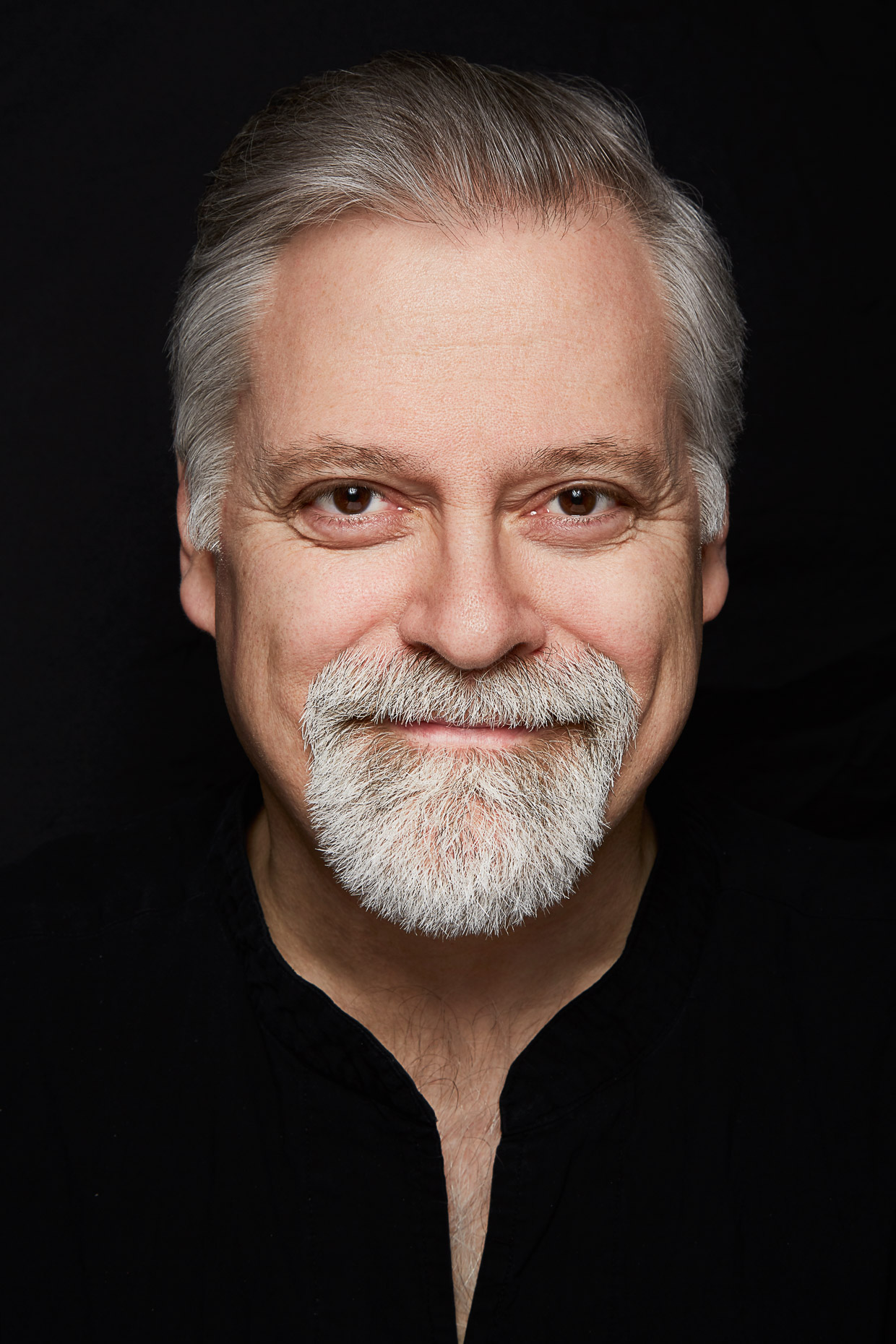
- Daron Hagen, the opera's composer
- Librettist: Gardner McFall
- Language: English
- Premiere: May 8, 2010; Seattle Opera, Seattle, Washington

Amelia is an opera in two acts by Daron Hagen to a libretto in English by Gardner McFall based on a story by Stephen Wadsworth. It had its world premiere at the Seattle Opera on 8 May 2010.

== Background and performance history ==
In 2007 Amelia became Seattle Opera's first new commission in 25 years. The Andrew W. Mellon Foundation issued a grant of $500,000 in 2009 to underwrite the first two revivals of the world premiere production.

== Roles ==
Roles, voice types, premiere cast
Role	Voice type	Premiere cast, 8 May 2010 Conductor: Gerard Schwarz Seattle Opera, Seattle	Premiere of reduced orchestration 27 January 2012 Conductor: Brett Mitchell Moores Opera Center, Houston
Amelia	mezzo-soprano	Kate Lindsey	Megan Berti
Dodge	tenor	William Burden	Chris Trapani
Amanda	mezzo-soprano	Luretta Bybee	Elizabeth Evans
Paul	baritone	Nathan Gunn / David McFerrin	Trevor Martin / Jared Guest
The Flier	lyric soprano	Jennifer Zetlan	Ashly Neumann / Kirsten Leslie
Icarus / Young Boy	tenor	Nicholas Coppolo	Peter Tran / Aaron Casey
Daedalus / Father	bass	Jordan Bisch	Joshua Green / Jacob Kincaide
Helen	soprano	Jane Eaglen	Rebecca Kidnie / Lynda McKnight
Young Amelia	lyric soprano	Ashley Emerson	Angela Schmidt / Melinda Harrison
Trang / Nurse	soprano	Karen Vuong	Marion Dickson
Huy / Doctor	baritone	David Won	Fredy Bonilla
Interpreter	baritone	Museop Kim	Dennis Gallagher
Chaplain	bass	Craig Grayson	Jordan Koenig
Commanding Officer	tenor	Wesley Rogers	Ryan Ford / Alex Bruce
Political Official	speaking role	Karl Marx Reyes	Ryan Frenk
NVA Soldiers	speaking role	Monty Noboru Carter, Leodigario del Rosario, Alex Mansouri	Eric Kao, Son Tran, Vincent Tran

== Synopsis ==
The opera is set in America and Vietnam between 1966 and 1996. It revolves around the title character, Amelia, who is expecting her first child and explores her relationship with her father, Dodge, a United States Navy pilot who died in the Vietnam War. The story is told by interweaving various times, realities, and real, historic, and mythological figures.

=== Act 1 ===
Scene 1: America, the Mid-1960s

Outside a suburban tract house a nine-year-old girl named Amelia sings a hymn to the stars as inside her mother folds laundry. Her father, a navy pilot named Dodge, emerges from the house in dress whites and indicates to her that it is time for bed. Her mother, Amanda, receives news that her husband Dodge has been shot down and is missing over Vietnam. Amelia is sung to sleep by her father and dreams of the final flight of Amelia Earhart. During the course of the scene it becomes clear that we are seeing the father and his daughter in flashback and the mother in the present.

Scene 2: America, mid-1990s

Amelia, now aged 31 and in the final trimester of pregnancy, awakens in the arms of her husband Paul, an aeronautical engineer. Across the room toil Icarus and Daedalus on their wings. They are products of Amelia's imagination. It becomes clear that Amelia has serious unresolved emotional and psychological issues with the loss of her father that have been intensified by her pregnancy. In a flashback, she relives the moment her mother told her that her father had gone missing.

Scene 3: Vietnam, mid-1980s

Amelia and Amanda travel to a village in Vietnam after being contacted by a North Vietnamese couple, Huy and Trang, who have information about Dodge. The women communicate with the couple through an interpreter. (Much of the scene is sung in the Vietnamese language.) As Huy and Trang tell their story, pointing to where Dodge was shot down, the action they describe is played out around them. A village political official threatens a young girl in order to force Dodge to talk. He accidentally shoots her. That girl was the couple's daughter. Dodge crawls to the daughter, closes her eyes, pulls a photo of his own daughter out of his flight suit, presents it to the parents of the girl. Also, he gives them his "final letter", which they conceal from the North Vietnamese Army. "Why did you wait so long to write to us?" Amelia asks the couple. "Because the girl was our daughter," Trang replies. He goes to the family altar, takes down a photo, and hands it to Amelia. It is Dodge's picture of Amelia as a girl. Amanda asks about the envelope. "A letter for you," says Huy. "Do you have it?" asks Amelia. "We burned it. We were angry."

=== Act 2 ===
Scene 1: America: the mid-1990s

Amelia, extremely close to delivery, bursts into Paul's place of work and confronts him with her concerns. She has a nervous collapse.

Scene 2: A hospital, three days later

Amelia lies in a coma. In a room elsewhere in the hospital a young boy (played by the actor who portrayed Icarus) is dying in a bed, his father (played by the actor who portrayed Daedalus) holds his hand. Amelia has a grown up dream of Amelia Earhart, whose plane materializes above her bed, and who remains for the rest of the opera, a source of inspiration and courage to the real-life Amelia. During the course of the scene, Amelia dreams of her father Dodge, who comes to speak with her about his disappearance, life, and having a baby. She decides to wake up, and does, just after the boy flatlines and dies. Amelia, hard into labor, is wheeled to a delivery room.

Scene 3: The same hospital, a dozen or so hours later

Amelia, who has insisted upon natural childbirth, despite the grave risk to herself, goes through the final minutes of her labor as, around her, doctors proceed with the business of the hospital, the father receives his boy's belongings in a small plastic bag, is counseled by a priest and grief counselor. The circle of life is drawn closed as people from Amelia's life (including her parents) seem to reappear as other people – doctors, nurses, orderlies. The baby emerges. An elaborate a cappella nonet ensues for all of the opera's major characters during which Amelia Earhart looks out happily into the opera house, the father puts on his coat and shuffles out, Paul and Amelia admire their new baby.

== Critical response ==
Heidi Waleson, in The Wall Street Journal, described the work as "both highly original and gripping. ... Amelia is a modern opera with traditional values: Ms. McFall's multilayered libretto never loses sight of its story, and Mr. Hagen's restless, questioning music never loses its heart." George Loomis, in the Financial Times, wrote that "the expressive range of Hagen's music broadens memorably to accommodate the cascade of divergent emotions en route to a grand, life-affirming unaccompanied ensemble for the nine principal singers." Anthony Tommasini, in The New York Times, described the opera as "earnest and original, if heavy-handed and melodramatic. ... a serious, heartfelt and unusual work." Bernard Jacobsen, in the Seattle Times, wrote, "Besides cleverly enabling the sung text to emerge with rare clarity, Hagen has fashioned a score of impassioned and compelling beauty. His melodic lines are eminently singable, and his sumptuous orchestral writing constantly enchants the ear. ...it stands as an achievement at once profound and hugely enjoyable." Ivan Katz, in the Huffington Post, wrote "Daron Aric Hagen's score is well-composed and, in many respects, a work of genius. He tends to write in a more facile manner for the women, but his writing for the men (especially tenor William Burden) is complex and highly effective."
