= Shining Brow =

1993 opera by Daron Hagen

- Opera by Daron Hagen
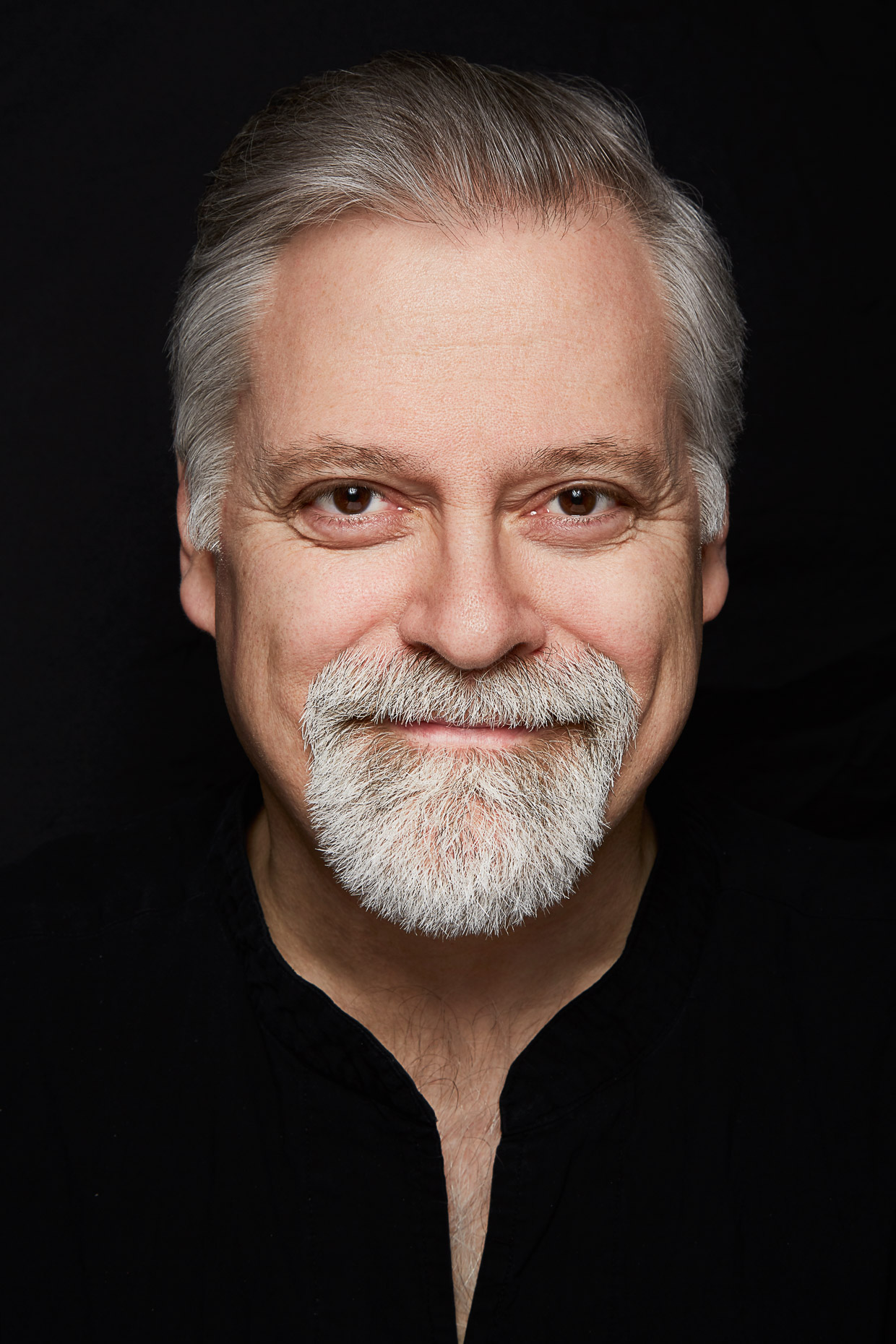
- Daron Hagen, the opera's composer
- Librettist: Paul Muldoon
- Language: English
- Premiere: April 21, 1993; Madison Opera, Madison, Wisconsin

Shining Brow is an English language opera by the American composer Daron Hagen, first performed by the Madison Opera in Madison, Wisconsin, April 21, 1993. The libretto is by Paul Muldoon, and is based on a treatment co-written with the composer. The story concerns events in the life of architect Frank Lloyd Wright. Hagen invited Muldoon to write the libretto while the two were both in residency at the MacDowell Colony, in Peterborough, New Hampshire during the summer of 1989. Hagen and Muldoon consulted with members of the Frank Lloyd Wright Foundation, including Richard Carney and Wes Peters, at Taliesin (studio) during the course of their research. Hagen recalls in his memoir that a delegation from Taliesin attending his presentation of the first act to Madison Opera, after which "Dick [Carney] pledged that the Fellowship would support my creation of the opera."

== Name ==
The opera's title, Shining Brow, comes from the Welsh Taliesin, the name of Wright's homes in Wisconsin and Arizona.

== Performance history ==
The opera received its world premiere on 21 April 1993 from the Madison Opera, Wisconsin. The production was broadcast live statewide and subsequently broadcast twice on NPR's World of Opera. Hagen created a 36-player reduced orchestration version for Chicago Opera Theater that was premiered in July 1997. Hagen crafted a first chamber opera version ("Fallingwater") that was premiered by the Opera Theater of Pittsburgh on 7 June 2013, at Fallingwater, Mill Run, Pennsylvania, and a second chamber version ("Usonian") on 14 October 2017 for UrbanArias in Washington, D.C. For Arizona Opera's commissioned "Taliesin West Version" in 2019, Hagen streamlined the score and libretto, folding all of the secondary roles into the chorus, cutting twenty minutes of music, and eliminating the interval, resulting in a 90-minute run-time. In addition, at the suggestion of stage director Chas Rader-Shieber, Hagen eliminated the female choristers.

== Roles ==
Role	Voice type	Premiere Cast 21 April 1993 (Conductor: Roland Johnson)	Reduced Orchestration Premiere 23 July 1997 (Conductor: Lawrence Rapchak)	Premiere Recording 4 November 2006 (Conductor: JoAnn Falletta)	Chamber "Fallingwater" Version 7 June 2013 (Conductor: Robert Frankenberry)	Chamber "Usonian" Version 14 October 2017 (Conductor: Robert Wood)	"Taliesin West" Version 27 September 2019 (Conductor: Lidiya Yankovskaya)
Frank Lloyd Wright	baritone	Michael Sokol	Robert Orth	Robert Orth	Kevin Kees	Sidney Outlaw	John Moore / Rob McGinness
Mamah Cheney	soprano	Carolann Page	Brenda Harris	Brenda Harris	Lara Lynn Cottrill	Miriam Khalil	Laura Wilde
Louis Sullivan	tenor	Barry Busse	Barry Busse	Robert Frankenberry	James Flora	Robert Baker	Bille Bruley
Edwin Cheney	bass-baritone	Bradley Garvin	Bradley Garvin	Matthew Curran	Dimitrie Lazich	Ben Wager	Michael Adams
Catherine Wright	mezzo-soprano	Kitt Reuter-Foss	Kitt Reuter-Foss	Elaine Valby	Kara Cornell	Rebecca Ringle	Katherine Beck
Julian Carleton	spoken	John Odom	Peter Mowhawk	Elem Eley	x	x	Ian Christiansen
Marion Mahoney / Draftsperson	soprano / baritone	Katherine Cloutier	Rosa Pascarella	James Demler	x	x	x
Maid	lyric soprano	Mimmi Fulmer	Diane Ragains	Gilda Lyons	Anna McTiernan	x	Cadie Jordan
Last Draftsman	soprano / baritone	Katherine Cloutier	Rosa Pascarella	James Demler			
Draftsman	tenor	David Gagnon	Charles Wolter	Tony Barton			
Waiter	spoken	John Tallman	Peter Mowhawk	Elem Eley			
Wife 1	soprano	Deanna Gibeau	Sandra Cross	Jennifer Lynn Reckamp			
Wife 2	soprano	Gale Ketteler	Elizabeth Fauntleroy	Gilda Lyons			
Wife 3	soprano	Lori Poulson	Lilah Greendale	Jennifer Lynn Reckamp			
Townswoman 1	mezzo-soprano	Joanna Johnston	Meredith Barber / Patricia Meuller	Jennifer Lynn Reckamp			
Townswoman 2	mezzo-soprano	Laura Tucker	Cynthia Mallard / Jan Bickel	Deborah Fleischer			
Reporter	tenor	Kevin Jeffers	Roy C. Smith	Eric Fleischer			
Workman 1	baritone	Joel Kopischke	Nicholas Solomon	James Demler			
Workman 2	baritone	David Williams	Jan Jarvis	Tony Barton			
Workman/reporter/photographer	bass baritone	Bruce Baumer	Peter Van der Graaff	James Demler			
Workman/reporter/draftsman/guest	baritone	James Demler	Henry Hunt	Eric Fleischer			
Workman/reporter/draftsman/guest	tenor	Patrick Jones	Mark Meier	Tony Barton			
Draftsmen, townspeople, guests	chorus	Madison Opera Chorus	Chicago Opera Theater Chorus	Buffalo Philharmonic Chorus	x	x	Arizona Opera Male Chorus
Orchestra		Madison Symphony	Chicago Opera Theater Orchestra	Buffalo Philharmonic	Opera Theater of Pittsburgh Orchestra	Atlas Arts Chamber Orchestra	Arizona Opera Orchestra

== Synopsis ==
The action takes place in Chicago, Illinois, at Taliesin, Frank Lloyd Wright's home and studio in Spring Green, Wisconsin, and in Berlin, Germany, between 1903 and 1914.

=== Prologue ===
The Cliff Dwellers Club, Chicago, 1903. Architect Louis Sullivan, mentor and friend of Frank Lloyd Wright, has been drinking all afternoon. He muses on his estrangement from Wright.

=== Act One ===
Wright's studio, Oak Park, Illinois, 1903. Wright pitches plans for a new house to wealthy Chicagoans Edwin and Mamah Cheney. He and Mamah flirt; her husband is concerned with costs. After they leave, Wright muses on Mamah; his wife Catherine overhears him and they quarrel.

The Cheney House construction site, six months later. Workmen sing, townswomen gossip; Wright and Mamah arrive to view the work as their liaison deepens. Edwin arrives and there is a showdown: Mamah tells Edwin she is leaving him for Wright. Afterwards, Edwin laments the fact that, while he has gained a house, he has lost his wife.

Mamah's apartment in Berlin, 1910. As Mamah translates some verses from German, she comes to terms with her strongly ambivalent feelings about her life with Wright, recognizing, despite her love for him, that her dream of an equal partnership with him is and will remain just that. Sullivan, in Chicago, echoes the sentiment.

=== Act Two ===
Taliesin, Spring Green, Christmas, 1911. Wright delivers a prepared statement attempting to explain his living out of wedlock with Mamah while still married to Catherine. Mamah, though at his side, is clearly disaffected.

Taliesin, Summer, 1914. During the course of a cocktail party, Wright pursues a new love interest as Mamah cannot help but observe; various clients, guests, colleagues, and employees — including an inebriated barbershop quartet of newspaper reporters — comment.

The Cliff Dwellers' Club, later that summer. Wright and Sullivan attempt a reconciliation, but are interrupted by Edwin Cheney, who delivers the news that Mamah's been murdered and Taliesin torched.

The ruins of Taliesin, later that night. The bodies of the dead are arrayed in the smoking remains of the house. A Maid explains that Julian Carleton, Wright's chef, has been found, his throat burned from drinking hydrochloric acid. Wright gropes for a way to go on, finds in the pocket of Mamah's coat a letter that gives him consolation of a sort. He vows to rebuild the house in her memory.

== Documentation ==
The vocal score is published by E.C. Schirmer and the libretto is published by Faber and Faber. A complete cast recording is available on Naxos performed by the Buffalo Philharmonic, cast by Hagen and conducted by JoAnn Falletta. Hagen writes extensively in his memoir about the work's genesis and development. Lynn Keller conducted on April 22 and 23, 1993, in Madison, Wisconsin, during the opening run of the opera, a two-part interview (later indexed in Contemporary Literary Criticism, Vol. 166) that captures Muldoon reflecting in detail on writing the libretto as a dramatic poem, working with Hagen, and shaping the historical material around Frank Lloyd Wright, Mamah Cheney, and the Taliesin fire. Hagen also describes at length the key relationships and motivic development of the work on NPR's All Things Considered and in Wisconsin Public Televisions' 1993 documentary The Making of Shining Brow.
