= Paul Muldoon =

Irish poet

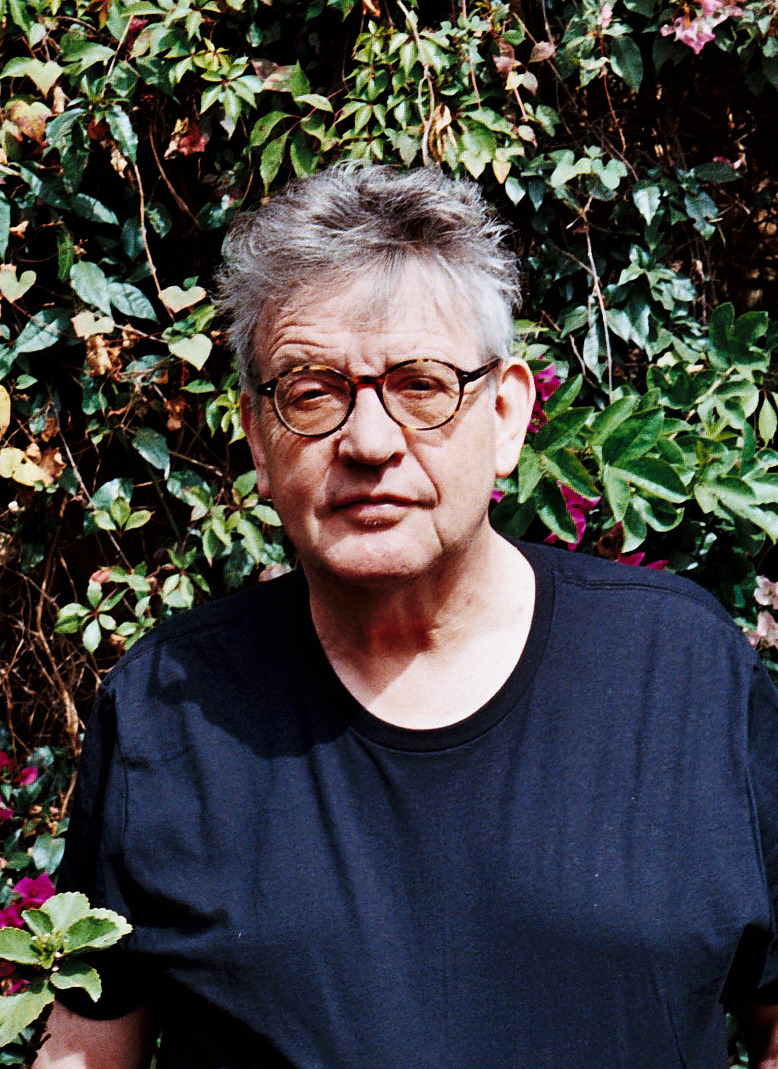
- Muldoon in 2018
- Born: 20 June 1951 (age 74) Portadown, Northern Ireland
- Occupation: Poet, author, and writer
- Education: Queen's University Belfast (BA)
- Spouse: Jean Hanff Korelitz

Website
- paulmuldoonpoetry.com

Paul Muldoon is an Irish poet, born in 1951. He has published more than thirty collections and won a Pulitzer Prize for Poetry and the T. S. Eliot Prize. At Princeton University he has been both the Howard G. B. Clark '21 University Professor in the Humanities and Founding Chair of the Lewis Center for the Arts. He held the post of Oxford Professor of Poetry from 1999 to 2004 and has also served as president of the Poetry Society (UK) and poetry editor at The New Yorker.

== Life and work ==
Muldoon was born, the eldest of three children, on a farm in County Armagh outside The Moy, near the boundary with County Tyrone, Northern Ireland. His father worked as a farmer (among other jobs) and his mother was a school mistress. In 2001, Muldoon said of the Moy:

It's a beautiful part of the world. It's still the place that's 'burned into the retina', and although I haven't been back there since I left for university 30 years ago, it's the place I consider to be my home. We were a fairly non-political household; my parents were nationalists, of course, but it was not something, as I recall, that was a major area of discussion. But there were patrols; an army presence; movements of troops; and a sectarian divide. And that particular area was a nationalist enclave, while next door was the parish where the Orange Order was founded; we'd hear the drums on summer evenings. But I think my mother, in particular, may have tried to shelter us from it all. Besides, we didn't really socialise a great deal. We were 'blow-ins' – arrivistes – new to the area, and didn't have a lot of connections.

Talking of his home life, he continues: "I'm astonished to think that, apart from some Catholic Truth Society pamphlets, some books on saints, there were, essentially, no books in the house, except one set, the Junior World Encyclopaedia, which I certainly read again and again. People would say, I suppose, that it might account for my interest in a wide range of arcane bits of information. At some level, I was self-educated." He was a '"Troubles poet" from the beginning.

In 1969, Muldoon read English at Queen's University Belfast, where he met Seamus Heaney and became close to the Belfast Group of poets which included Michael Longley, Ciarán Carson, Medbh McGuckian and Frank Ormsby. Muldoon said of the experience, "I think it was fairly significant, certainly to me. It was exciting. But then I was 19, 20 years old, and at university, so everything was exciting, really." Muldoon was not a strong student at Queen's. He recalls: "I had stopped. Really, I should have dropped out. I'd basically lost interest halfway through. Not because there weren't great people teaching me, but I'd stopped going to lectures, and rather than doing the decent thing, I just hung around". During his time at Queen's, his first collection New Weather was published by Faber and Faber. He met his first wife, fellow student Anne-Marie Conway, and they were married after their graduation in 1973. Their marriage broke up in 1977.

For thirteen years (1973–86), Muldoon worked as an arts producer for the BBC in Belfast. In this time, which saw the most bitter period of the Troubles, he published the collections Why Brownlee Left (1980) and Quoof (1983). After leaving the BBC, he taught English and Creative Writing at the University of East Anglia and at Caius College and Fitzwilliam College, Cambridge, where his students included Lee Hall (Billy Elliot) and Giles Foden (Last King of Scotland). In 1987, Muldoon emigrated to the United States, where he taught in the creative writing program at Princeton. He was Professor of Poetry at Oxford University for the five-year term 1999–2004, and is an Honorary Fellow of Hertford College, Oxford.

Muldoon is married to novelist Jean Hanff Korelitz, whom he met at an Arvon writing course. He has two children, Dorothy and Asher, and lives primarily in New York City.

== Poetry and other works ==
His poetry is known for his difficult, sly, allusive style, casual use of obscure or archaic words, understated wit, punning, and deft technique in meter and slant rhyme. As Peter Davidson says in The New York Times review of books "Muldoon takes some honest-to-God reading. He's a riddler, enigmatic, distrustful of appearances, generous in allusion, doubtless a dab hand at crossword puzzles". In 2001, Robert Potts, former editor of Poetry Review of The Guardian, cited him as being "among the few significant poets of our half-century"; "the most significant English-language poet born since the second world war" – a talent off the map. (Notably, Seamus Heaney was born in 1939.) Muldoon's work is often compared with Heaney, a fellow Northern Irish poet, friend and mentor to Muldoon.

In 2003, Muldoon won the Pulitzer Prize for Poetry. He has been awarded fellowships in the Royal Society of Literature and the American Academy of Arts and Sciences; the 1994 T. S. Eliot Prize; the 1997 Irish Literature Prize for Poetry, and the 2003 Griffin International Prize for Excellence in Poetry. He was also shortlisted for the 2007 Poetry Now Award. Muldoon's poems have been collected into four books: Selected Poems 1968–1986 (1986), New Selected Poems: 1968–1994 (1996), Poems 1968–1998 (2001) and Selected Poems 1968–2014 (2016). In September 2007, he was hired as poetry editor of The New Yorker.

Most of Muldoon's collections contain shorter poems with an inclusion of a long concluding poem. As Muldoon produced more collections, the long poems gradually took up more space in the volume, until in 1990 the poem Madoc: A Mystery took over the volume of that name, leaving only seven short poems to appear before it. Muldoon has not since published a poem of comparable length, but a new trend is emerging whereby more than one long poem appears in a volume.

Madoc: A Mystery, exploring themes of colonisation, is among Muldoon's most difficult works. It includes, as "poetry", such non-literary constructions as maps and geometric diagrams. In the book Irish Poetry since 1950, John Goodby states it is "by common consent, the most complex poem in modern Irish literature [...] – a massively ambitious, a historiographical metafiction". The post-modern poem narrates, in 233 sections (the same number as the number of Native American tribes), an alternative history in which Samuel Taylor Coleridge and Robert Southey come to America to found a utopian community. The two poets had, in reality, discussed but never undertaken this journey. Muldoon's poem is inspired by Southey's work Madoc, about a legendary Welsh prince of that name. Critics are divided over the poem's success. Some are stunned by its scope and many others, such as John Banville, have professed themselves utterly baffled by it – feeling it to be wilfully obscure. Muldoon says of it: "I quite enjoy having fun. It's part of how it is, and who we are."

Muldoon has contributed the librettos for four operas by Daron Hagen: Shining Brow (1992), Vera of Las Vegas (1996), Bandanna (1998), and The Antient Concert (2005). His interests have not only included librettos, but rock lyrics as well, penning lines for the band The Handsome Family as well as co-writing the title track of Warren Zevon's album My Ride's Here. Muldoon also writes lyrics for (and plays "rudimentary" rhythm guitar in) his own Princeton-based rock bands. Rackett (2004–2010) was disbanded in 2010. Another of Muldoon's bands, Wayside Shrines, has recorded and released thirteen of the lyrics included in Muldoon's collection of rock lyrics, Word on the Street. His current group is known as Paul Muldoon & Rogue Oliphant. In 2025 they released their acclaimed album, "Visible From Space" on Soul Selects Records.

Muldoon has also edited a number of anthologies, including The Lyrics: 1956 to the Present by Paul McCartney, published in 2021, written two children's books, translated the work of other authors, performed live at the Poetry Brothel. and published critical prose.

== Awards ==
Muldoon has won the following major poetry awards:

- 1990: Guggenheim Fellowship
- 1992: Geoffrey Faber Memorial Prize for Madoc: A Mystery
- 1994: T. S. Eliot Prize for The Annals of Chile
- 1997: Irish Times' Irish Literature Prize for Poetry, for New Selected Poems 1968–1994
- 2002: T. S. Eliot Prize (shortlist) for Moy Sand and Gravel
- 2003: Griffin Poetry Prize (Canada) for Moy Sand and Gravel
- 2003: Pulitzer Prize for Poetry for Moy Sand and Gravel
- 2004: American Ireland Fund Literary Award
- 2004: Aspen Prize for Poetry
- 2004: Shakespeare Prize
- 2009: John William Corrington Award for Literary Excellence
- 2017: Queen's Gold Medal for Poetry

== Selected honours ==
- Honorary Professor in the School of English at the University of St Andrews (Scotland)
- The Professor of Poetry at University of Oxford (1999–2004) (England)
- Honorary Fellow of Hertford College, Oxford University (England)
- Fellow of the Royal Society of Literature (England)
- Member of American Academy of Arts and Sciences (elected 2000) (US)
- Awarded an honorary doctorate by Trinity College Dublin in 2014 (Ireland)
- Saoi of Aosdána (Saoi) (Ireland) in 2025

== Bibliography ==
=== Poetry: Main collections ===
- New Weather (1973) Faber & Faber, London
- Mules (1977) Faber & Faber, London / Wake Forest University Press, Winston-Salem, N.C.
- Why Brownlee Left (1980) Faber & Faber, London / Wake Forest University Press, Winston-Salem, N.C.
- Quoof (1983) Faber & Faber, London / Wake Forest University Press, Winston-Salem, N.C.
- Meeting the British (1987) Faber & Faber, London / Wake Forest University Press, Winston-Salem, N.C.
- Madoc: A Mystery (1990) Faber & Faber, London / Farrar, Straus & Giroux, New York
- The Annals of Chile (1994) Faber & Faber, London / Farrar, Straus & Giroux, New York
- Hay (1998) Faber & Faber, London / Farrar, Straus & Giroux, New York
- Moy Sand and Gravel (2002) Faber & Faber, London / Farrar, Straus & Giroux, New York (Pulitzer Prize for Poetry and the Griffin Poetry Prize)
- Horse Latitudes (2006) Faber & Faber, London / Farrar, Straus & Giroux, New York (shortlisted for T. S. Eliot Prize)
- Maggot (2010) Faber & Faber, London / Farrar, Straus & Giroux, New York (shortlisted for 2011 Poetry Now Award)
- One Thousand Things Worth Knowing (2014) Faber & Faber, London / Farrar, Straus & Giroux, New York
- Frolic and Detour (2019) Faber & Faber, London / Farrar, Straus & Giroux, New York
- Howdie-Skelp (2021) Faber & Faber, London / Farrar, Straus & Giroux, New York
- Joy in Service on Rue Tagore (2024) Faber & Faber, London / Farrar, Straus & Giroux, New York

=== Poetry: Selected editions ===
- Selected Poems 1968–1983 (1986) Faber & Faber, London
- Selected Poems 1968–1986 (1987) Ecco Press, New York
- New Selected Poems: 1968–1994 (1996) Faber & Faber, London
- Poems 1968–1998 (2001) Faber & Faber, London / Farrar, Straus & Giroux, New York
- Selected Poems 1968–2014 (2016) Faber & Faber, London / Farrar, Straus & Giroux, New York
- Dislocations: The Selected Innovative Poems of Paul Muldoon (2020) Liverpool University Press, Liverpool

=== Limited editions and booklets (poetry, prose, and translations) ===
- Knowing My Place (1971) Ulsterman Publications, Belfast
- Spirit of Dawn (1975) Ulsterman Publications, Belfast
- Names and Addresses (1978) Ulsterman Publications, Belfast
- Immram (1980) Gallery Press, Dublin
- The O-O's Party, New Year's Eve (1980) Gallery Press, Dublin
- Out of Siberia (1982) Gallery Press, Dublin
- The Wishbone (1984) Gallery Press, Dublin
- The Astrakhan Cloak (By Nuala Ní Dhomhnaill in Irish. Trans Muldoon.) (1992) Gallery Press, Dublin
- Shining Brow (1993) Faber & Faber, London
- The Prince of the Quotidian (1994) Gallery Press, Dublin
- Incantata (1994) Graphic Studio, Dublin
- Six Honest Serving Men (1995) Gallery Press, Dublin
- Kerry Slides (1996) Gallery Press, Dublin
- The Last Thesaurus (1996) Faber & Faber, London
- The Noctuary of Narcissus Batt (1997) Faber & Faber, London
- The Birds (Adaptation after Aristophanes) (1999) Gallery Press, Dublin
- Hopewell Haiku (1997) Warwick Press, Easthampton, Massachusetts
- The Bangle (Slight Return) (1998) Typography Press, Princeton, N.J.
- Bandanna (1999) Faber & Faber, London
- The End of the Poem: 'All Souls Night' by WB Yeats (lecture) (2000) Oxford University Press, Oxford
- Vera of Las Vegas (2001) Gallery Press, Dublin
- Unapproved Road (2002) Pied Oxen Press, Hopewell, N.J.
- Medley for Morin Khur (2005) Enitharmon Press, London
- Sixty Instant Messages to Tom Moore (2005) Modern Haiku Press, Lincoln, Illinois
- General Admission (2006) Gallery Press, Dublin
- I Might Make Out With You (2006) Lori Bookstein, New York
- The End of the Poem: Oxford Lectures (2006) Faber & Faber, London / Farrar, Straus & Giroux, New York
- The Fifty Minute Mermaid (By Nuala Ní Dhomhnaill in Irish. Trans Muldoon.) (2007) Gallery Press, Dublin
- When the Pie was Opened (2008) Sylph Editions, Lewes, East Sussex
- Plan B (2009) Enitharmon Press, London
- Wayside Shrines (2009) Gallery Press, Dublin
- Feet of Clay (2011) Four Candles Press, Oxford
- Epithalamium (2011) Emanon Press, Princeton, NJ
- Songs and Sonnets (2012) Enitharmon Press, London
- The Word on the Street (2013) Faber & Faber, London / Farrar, Straus & Giroux, New York
- At Sixes and Sevens (2013) Stoney Road Press, Dublin
- Encheiresin Naturae (2015) Nawakun Press, Santa Rosa, CA
- Rising to the Rising (2016) Gallery Press, Dublin
- I Gave The Pope A Rhino (2017) Fine Poetry Press, Manchester (Illustrated by Paul Wright, published by Andrew J Moorhouse, Fine Press Poetry, 2017)
- Superior Aloeswood (2017) Enitharmon Press, London
- Lamentations (2017) Gallery Press, Dublin
- Sadie and the Sadists (2017) Eyewear Publishing, London
- The Dead, 1904 (2018) Gallery Press, Dublin
- Binge (2020) Lifeboat Press, Belfast
- Sure Thing (2022) Lifeboat Press, Belfast
- The Castle of Perseverance (2022) Enitharmon Editions, London
- Custom of the Coast (2024) Gallery Press, Dublin

Anthologies (edited)

- The Scrake of Dawn: Poems by Young People from Northern Ireland. Ed.(1979)
- Contemporary Irish Poetry: An Anthology. Ed. by Anthony Bradley (1980)
- The Faber Book of Contemporary Irish Poetry. Ed. (1986)
- The Faber Book of Beasts. Ed. (1997)
- The Oxford and Cambridge May Anthologies 2000: Poetry. Ed. (2000)
- The Best American Poetry 2005. (Ed. with David Lehman) (2005)

=== Criticism, book reviews and other contributions ===
- Muldoon, Paul (3 March 2014). "Capital case : the poetry of E. E. Cummings". The Critics. Books. The New Yorker. Vol. 90, no. 2. pp. 70–74.
- To Ireland, I (Clarendon Lectures of 1998) (2000) Oxford University Press, London
- The End of the Poem (Oxford Lectures) (2006) Faber & Faber, London / Farrar, Straus & Giroux, New York

=== Interviews, critical studies and reviews of Muldoon's work ===
- Alonso, Alex, Paul Muldoon in America: Transatlantic Formations. Oxford: Oxford University Press, 2021.
- Holdridge, Jeff. The Poetry of Paul Muldoon. Dublin: Liffey Press, 2009.
- Keller, Lynn (Spring 1994). "An interview with Paul Muldoon". Contemporary Literature. 35 (1): 1–29. doi:10.2307/1208734. JSTOR 1208734.
- Kendall, Tim. Paul Muldoon. Chester Springs, PA: Dufour Editions, 1996.
- Randolph, Jody Allen. "Paul Muldoon, December 2009." Close to the Next Moment. Manchester: Carcanet, 2010.
- Redmond, John. "Interview with Paul Muldoon." Thumbscrew 4 Spring 1996.
- Sherman, Susan. "Yusef Komunyakaa and Paul Muldoon [Interview]." Bomb 65 Fall 1998.
- Wills, Clair. Reading Paul Muldoon. Newcastle upon Tyne: Bloodaxe, 1997.

== See also ==
- List of Northern Irish writers
- Oxford Professor of Poetry
- Pulitzer Prize for Poetry
- Postmodernism
