= Daron Hagen =

American composer, writer, and filmmaker (born 1961)

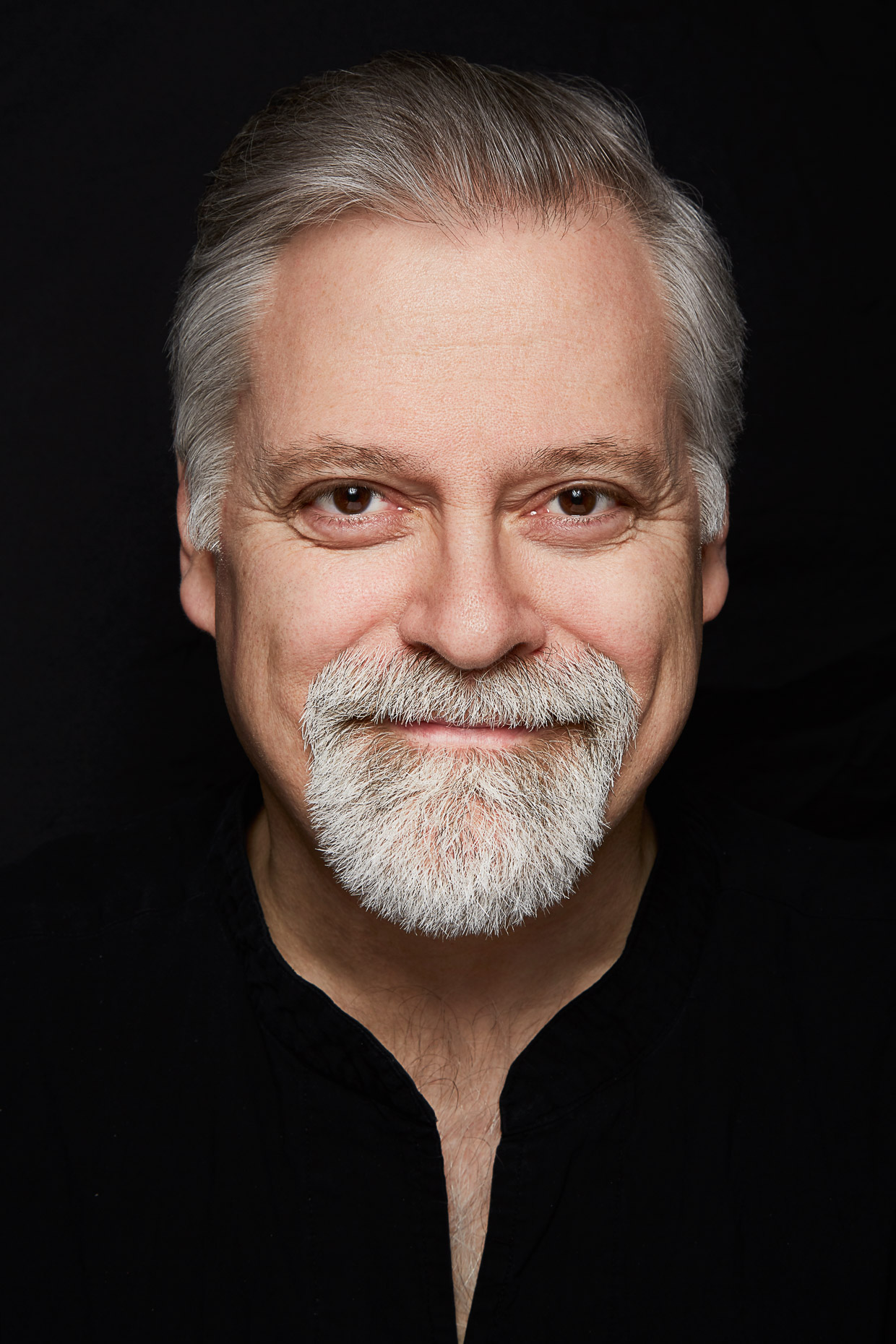
Daron Hagen

Daron Aric Hagen (/ˈhɑːɡən/ HAH-gən; born November 4, 1961) is an American composer, writer, and filmmaker.

== Biography ==
=== Early life ===
Daron Hagen was born in Milwaukee, Wisconsin, and grew up in New Berlin, a suburb west of Milwaukee. Hagen was the youngest of the three sons of Gwen Hagen, a visual artist, writer and advertising executive who studied creative writing with Mari Sandoz and enjoyed a successful advertising career as creative director of Exclusively Yours Magazine and Earl Hagen (an attorney). Hagen began composing prolifically in 1974, when his older brother Kevin gave him a recording and score of Benjamin Britten's Billy Budd. Two years later, at the age of fifteen, he conducted the premiere of his first orchestral work, a recording and score of which came to the attention of Leonard Bernstein, who enthusiastically urged Hagen to attend Juilliard to study with David Diamond. He studied piano with Adam Klescewski, and studied composition, piano, and conducting at the Wisconsin Conservatory of Music (where his teachers included Duane Dishaw and Judy Kramer) while attending Brookfield Central High School.

=== Early career ===
After two years at the University of Wisconsin–Madison, where his teachers included Catherine Comet (conducting), Jeanette Ross (piano), and Les Thimmig and Homer Lambrecht (composition), he was invited to attend the Curtis Institute of Music in Philadelphia by Ned Rorem (with whom he developed a lifelong friendship). While a student of Rorem's at Curtis, he studied piano with Marion Zarzeczna and also studied privately with Lukas Foss. Hagen moved to New York City in 1984 to complete his formal education as a student at Juilliard, studying first for two years with Diamond, then for a semester each with Joseph Schwantner and Bernard Rands. After graduating, Hagen was a Tanglewood composition fellow before briefly living abroad, first at the Camargo Foundation in Cassis, France, and then at the Rockefeller Foundation's Villa Serbelloni in Bellagio, Italy, where he has twice been a guest. Between 1985 and 1998 Hagen was also a frequent guest at the MacDowell Colony. When he returned to the United States, Hagen studied privately with Bernstein, whose guidance during the composition of Hagen's Shining Brow (1992) — the opera that launched Hagen's career internationally — prompted him to dedicate the score to Bernstein's memory.

=== Arts advocate and educator ===
As artistic director of the Perpetuum Mobile Concerts (1982–87) he premiered compositions by over a hundred American composers on concerts produced in Philadelphia and New York. Hagen served as president of the Lotte Lehmann Foundation (2004–07) in New York City, an international nonprofit organization dedicated to encouraging the performance and creation of opera and art song; from 2000 to 2018 he served as a trustee of the Douglas Moore Fund for American Opera and was elected a lifetime member of the Corporation of Yaddo in 2006. He is the founding artistic director of the New Mercury Collective, "a laboratory for artistic exploration, creative risk-taking, and performance in which its members can collaborate on the creation and performance of post-genre works combining theater, music, and emerging technology for audiences of all types." Hagen has been a featured composer at the Tanglewood, Mostly Modern, Ravinia, Wintergreen, and Aspen music festivals, and has served as artistic director and head of faculty for the Seasons Fall Music Festival in Yakima, Washington (2008–2012). He served as co-chair of Composition for the Wintergreen Summer Music Academy in Virginia (2015-2025).

Faculty appointments include a stint as composer in residence at the Music Conservatory of the Chicago College of Performing Arts that led to an invitation to join the artist faculty there (2017–2023) "in a multi-disciplinary position created for him that enable[d] him to share his skills as a stage director, dramaturge, composer, and social activist with students from throughout the Roosevelt University community as they shadowed him and collaborate in the development of a new Hagen opera each year." He has also served as the Franz Lehár Composer in Residence at the University of Pittsburgh (2007), twice as composer in residence for the Princeton University Atelier (1998, 2004–5); as artist in residence at the University of Nevada, Las Vegas (2000–2002); Sigma Chi-William P. Huffman Composer in Residence at Miami University, Oxford, Ohio (1999–2000); artist in residence at Baylor University, Waco, Texas (1998–1999); on the musical studies faculty of the Curtis Institute of Music (1996–1998); as an associate professor at Bard College (1988–1997); as a visiting professor at the City College of New York (1997, 1993–1994); and as a lecturer in music at New York University (1988–1990).

=== Compositional style and methods ===
Hagen's music is essentially tonal, though serial, pitch class, and octatonic procedures are customarily used for psychologically and emotionally fraught passages. It is "notable for its warm lyricism, but his style defies easy categorization. While his works demonstrate fluency with a range of twentieth-century compositional techniques, those procedures are secondary to his exploitation and expansion of the possibilities of tonal harmony, giving his music an immediacy that makes it appealing to a wide spectrum of audiences. His music is broadly eclectic, drawing on a variety of styles as diverse as jazz, Broadway, Latin music, Italian verismo, and soft rock." According to Hagen, "Polytonality figures prominently in the major operas as a mechanism for manifesting the interaction between characters." Hagen, asked at one point by Bernstein to complete Marc Blitzstein's opera Sacco and Vanzetti, acknowledges a debt to Blitzstein's music: "I find the musical DNA of which it is composed indispensable. Strands of that DNA — strict adherence to economy of means, a passion for combining words and music, the belief that music can promote social justice, an abhorrence of pretension — are woven contrapuntally, inextricably, into the music that I compose, and have been, nearly from the start."

Hagen's vocal music is described in The New Grove as "the cornerstone of his compositional output." He has remarked, "I love voices and I like singers, and along with the intersection of loving music and words and singers, I adore the process of composing and going through the production of musical theater. There is the communion of people coming together to commit to undertaking a work of art that is larger than any of us." "Using his gift for composing vocal lines, [Hagen] produces songs that flow lyrically and illuminate texts with unerring musical and dramatic aim. His scores are full of extensive markings, requiring singers to use variety of tone color to achieve the emotions inherent in the texts."

His operas embrace a particularly broad stylistic spectrum, and often "straddle the divide between the opera and musical theater worlds." In Shining Brow "Hagen's baseline idiom," writes Tom Strini, "seems to be modernist-expressionist, tonal but freely dissonant. He sets all sorts of influences, from barbershop to ticky-tick dance music against that idiom, to underscore character and crystallize the period (1903–'14)." In Vera of Las Vegas, Hagen, writes Robert Thicknesse, "blends idioms – neo-Gershwin, jazz, soft rock, Broadway – with soaring melodies that send the characters looping off in arias of self-revelation." "Bandanna is neither fish nor fowl – as fierce as verismo but wrought with infinite care; a melding of church and cantina and Oxonian declamation," writes Tim Page. Catherine Parsonage expands upon this assessment: "[it] is wholly convincing as a modern opera, ranging stylistically from the music theatre of Gershwin, Bernstein and Stephen Sondheim, to traditional mariachi music and contemporary opera of Benjamin Britten. Hagen, who served his apprenticeship on Broadway, acknowledges that holistically the piece falls between opera and musical theatre. Hagen's style encourages audiences to be actively involved in constructing their own meanings from the richness of the textual and musical cross-references in his work." Hagen's effective fusing of many styles into a coherent personal vision is recognized by a 2014 American Academy of Arts and Letters Academy Award that acknowledges the "outstanding artistic achievement [of] a composer who has arrived at his or her own voice."

In 2007 self-publishing enabled Hagen to become one of the first American opera composers to make evolving performance materials for the opera Amelia (and all his successive works) available exclusively in an online environment: "The opera's principals were given access to a password-protected website on which Hagen placed pdf files of Amelia's vocal score. When he modified a scene, he simply uploaded an edited file, and an automatically generated message informed the cast of the change."

=== Critical reception ===
According to Opera News, "to say that [Hagen] is a remarkable musician is to underrate him. Daron is music." The NATS Journal of Singing has described Hagen as "the finest American composer of vocal music in his generation."

Hagen's debut opera Shining Brow premiered in 1993 to universally glowing reviews in the international press. When the Buffalo Philharmonic released the first recording on Naxos in 2009, David Patrick Sterns noted in The Philadelphia Inquirer, "the ceaselessly inventive score hooks you early on, easily embracing a wide range of predominantly tonal modes of expression, from barbershop quartet to Der Rosenkavalier quotations. The music's theatrical timing and naturalistic sense of language – so problematic in other contemporary operas – feels effortlessly right. Dramatically speaking, the portrayal of the great architect is so unflinching that Wright (played with many layers of irony by the excellent Robert Orth) borders on being too unsympathetic to carry this sizable, two-act opera. Particularly effective is the musical creepiness that sets in as Wright's high-ego world grows refracted from reality.".

Hagen's 2010 opera Amelia premiered to positive reviews in The New York Times, Financial Times, Times of London, Seattle Times, The Washington Post, and Opera Magazine, among others. Heidi Waleson in The Wall Street Journal described the work as "both highly original and gripping. ... Amelia is a modern opera with traditional values ... Mr. Hagen's restless, questioning music never loses its heart." Ivan Katz, in The Huffington Post, wrote "Hagen's score is well-composed and, in many respects, a work of genius. He tends to write in a more facile manner for the women, but his writing for the men (especially tenor William Burden) is complex and highly effective." Anthony Tommasini in The New York Times noted that "the opera is earnest and original, if heavy-handed and melodramatic. [It is] a serious, heartfelt and unusual work. However, there is too much lyricism and no break in the orchestral richness."

His 2013 opera, A Woman in Morocco, deals with the issue of human trafficking. A "film noir, verismo, cinéma vérité". When the work was given its professional premiere in spring 2015 under Hagen's direction by Kentucky Opera, professional critics noted that "[its] complex score works to underline issues with leitmotifs, musical cues assigned to different characters, and music that never settles or rests. When singers get soaring arias, they emerge naturally from this intricate texture. Hagen has a gift for writing sensually rich tunes and uses this skill to release the music at important moments." Most of the universally positive reviews touched approvingly on the opera's subject matter: "Will [a new opera] find a connection with tradition while creating something fresh and timely? I believe that composer Daron Hagen and his co-librettist Barbara Grecki have [done this] with their new two-act opera. ... Hagen's score feelingly captures the deep contradictions of its story and its characters in music that evokes the beauty and mystery of an exotic landscape, the dangerous and deceptive sensuality of its inhabitants, and the intense violence that is always just beneath the surface of a culture that threatens and terrorizes women.

=== Writer, director, and operafilm-maker ===
Hagen lays out his creative manifesto as an auteur "operafilm" creator in his monograph, "Exploring Operafilm: Making the Bardo Trilogy," (2026) “Operafilm [is] a new audiovisual genre in which the auteur director-composer-writer-editor's consistent application of aesthetic, practical, and technical correlatives between music drama, film, and their performance practices create and sustain a coherent aesthetic world in which every element manifests that world." He further explains in his memoir, “Duet with the Past” (2019) that he began working out the idea of “operafilm” and The Bardo Trilogy while directing the premiere of I Hear America Singing (2014) for the Skylight Music Theater and his “three-camera staging” of A Woman in Morocco (2015) for Kentucky Opera. Orson Rehearsed, (2021), part one of the Bardo Trilogy, explored Orson Welles’ dying thoughts; part two, 9/10: Love Before the Fall (2023), combined mythological and “real” characters in an Italian bistro the night before the Twin Towers disaster; part three, I Hear America Singing (2025), combined and subverted the conventions of musical theater and documentary film, to explore the last days of a Broadway composer. The trilogy is heavily laureled internationally, recorded on labels such as Naxos Records, and may be viewed worldwide on Amazon Prime Video and other streamers.

=== Awards ===
- 1979 – ASCAP Raymond Hubbell Scholarship
- 1982, 1983, 1984 – Broadcast Music Incorporated Young Composer Prizes
- 1982, 1983, 1984 – ASCAP Morton Gould Prizes
- 1983 – ASCAP Samuel Barber Scholarship
- 1983 – Charles Ives Prize, American Academy of Arts and Letters
- 1985 – Joseph H. Bearns Prize, Columbia University
- 1987 – Barlow Endowment International Prize for Chamber Music Composition
- 1988 – ASCAP Rudolf Nissim Prize for Best Orchestral Work
- 1990 – Kennedy Center Friedheim Award, for the orchestral work, Common Ground
- 1997 – Opera America's Next Stage Award
- 1997 – National Endowment for the Arts, production grant for Shining Brow revival
- 2012 – Guggenheim Fellowship
- 2014 – Arts and Letters Award in Music, American Academy of Arts and Letters
- 2025 – Bogliasco Foundation Liguria Study Center for the Arts Fellow

== List of works ==
His first composition to attract wide attention was Prayer for Peace, premiered by the Philadelphia Orchestra (1981), garnering him the distinction of being the youngest composer since Samuel Barber to be premiered by that orchestra; the New York Philharmonic commissioned Philharmonia for its 150th anniversary (1990); the University of Wisconsin Madison School of Music commissioned Concerto for Brass Quintet for its 100th anniversary (1995); the Curtis Institute commissioned Much Ado for its 75th anniversary (2000). Hagen's commissions from major orchestras and performers between 1981 and 2008 included orchestral works, five symphonies (for the orchestras of Philadelphia, Milwaukee, Oakland, Albany, and Phoenix), seven concertos (for Gary Graffman, Jaime Laredo, Sharon Robinson, Jeffrey Khaner, and Sara Sant'Ambrogio, among others), several massive works for chorus and orchestra, two dozen choral works (including one for the Kings Singers), ballet scores, concert overtures, showpieces, two brass quintets, six piano trios, three string quartets, an oboe quintet, a duo for violin and cello, solo works for piano (His Suite for Piano was a featured new work for the Thirteenth Van Cliburn International Piano Competition, and works for Lara Downes and Bruce Brubaker), organ, violin (for Michaela Paetsch), viola, and cello, and seventeen published cycles of art songs. (Hagen has over 300 art songs in print.)

A frequent collaborator with living writers, he has set poetry by Nuar Alsadir, Mark Campbell, Ze'ev Dunei, Stephen Dunn, Sarah Gorham, Susan Griffin, Peter Handke, Reine Hauser, Seamus Heaney, Robert Kelley, Richard McCann, Kim Roberts, Stephen Sandy, Mark Skinner, and Mark Strand, among others. In 1990 Hagen began a creative collaboration with the Irish poet Paul Muldoon that resulted in four major operas: Shining Brow (1992), Vera of Las Vegas (1996), Bandanna (1998), and The Antient Concert (2005). "[Writing libretti for Hagen's operas gave Muldoon], a writer who has had to weather accusations of cerebral detachment and heartlessness the opportunity to indulge in frank emotionalism," writes David Wheatley. Libretti for Hagen operas have also been written by Barbara Grecki (New York Stories, 2008), J.D. McClatchy (Little Nemo in Slumberland, 2010), and Gardner McFall (Amelia, 2010). He has written his own libretti (A Woman in Morocco, 2013,New York Stories, 2008,Orson Rehearsed, 2019, and 9/10: Love Before the Fall, 2023).

=== Recordings and publishing ===
Recordings of Hagen works may be found on the Albany Records, Arsis, Sierra, TNC, Mark, Naxos Records, Sony Classical Records and CRI labels, among others. His music was published exclusively by EC Schirmer in Boston (1982–90); and then by Carl Fischer Music in New York (1990–2006); in 2007 he began self-publishing under the imprint Burning Sled. In 2017, Burning Sled struck a licensing agreement with Peermusic Classical for Hagen's operas. In 2022, Peermusic acquired the remainder of Hagen's catalogue.

== Dissertations ==
- Jens Staubrand: Kierkegaard International Bibliography Music Works and Plays, Copenhagen 2009. In English and Danish. ISBN 978-87-92510-05-1, Including Daron Hagen's LORD, GOD IN HEAVEN from LITTLE PRAYERS, 1994
- Paul Kreider 1999. Art songs of Daron Hagen: lyrical dramaticism and simplicity with an interpretive guide to rittenhouse songs and resuming green. DMA diss., University of Arizona, Tucson, Arizona.
- Edwin Powell 2002. Bandanna, an opera by Daron Aric Hagen with libretto by Paul Muldoon commissioned by the College Band Directors National Association: the origins of an artwork with a glimpse at its musical character development. DMA diss., University of North Texas, Denton, Texas.
- Jane McCalla Redding 2002. An introduction to American song composer Daron Aric Hagen (b. 1961) and his miniature folk opera: dear youth. DMA diss., Louisiana State University, Baton Rouge, Louisiana.
- Sarah Elizabeth Snydacker 2011.The new American song: A catalog of published songs by 25 living American composers. Ph.D. diss., University of Iowa, Iowa City, Iowa.
- Wallace, Jacob 2015. Bandanna Overture. In Teaching Music through Performance in Band. Volume 10, Compiled and edited by Richard Miles, 705–714. Chicago: GIA Publications.
- Jay B. Aiken 2016. The Choral Music of Daron Aric Hagen and a Conductor's Analysis of Flight Music. DMA, University of South Carolina, Columbia, SC.
- Nicole Kenley-Miller 2012–2018. Voicing Virginia: Adaptation of Woolf’s Words to Music. DMA diss., University of Houston, Houston, Texas.
- Noh, Shin-Yeong 2019. Emily Dickinson's Poetic Imagery in 21st-century Songs by Lori Laitman, Jake Heggie, and Daron Hagen. DMA diss., Indiana University, Bloomington, Indiana.
- Kosin, Kelci Dalayne, 2019 A performance guide to selected arias from Daron Hagen's opera Amelia through the study of selected Hagen art songs. DA, Ball State University, Muncie, IN.,
