= Gilda Lyons =

American composer (born 1975)

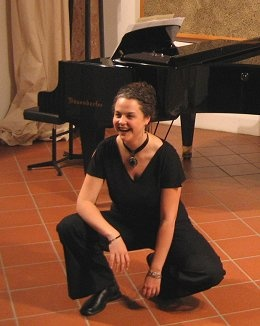
Gilda Lyons in 2012

Gilda Lyons (born January 11, 1975, Rhinebeck, New York) is an American composer, vocalist, and visual artist who writes music that "combines elements of renaissance, neo-baroque, spectral, agitprop Music Theater, and extended vocalism".

== Education and early career ==
Lyons attended Bard College, where she studied with Joan Tower and Daron Hagen, and in 1997 received a Bachelor of Arts degree in Music Composition, Vocal Performance, and Visual Arts.

She then attended the University of Pittsburgh, where she studied with Eric Moe and Anne LeBaron, and received a Master of Arts degree in Music Composition and Theory in 2001.

She studied with Daria Semegen and Peter Winkler at the State University of New York at Stony Brook, receiving a Doctor of Philosophy degree in 2005.

Lyons also studied voice, first at Bard with Arthur Burrows, then privately with heldentenor Barry Busse.

American Opera Projects in New York City chose her doctoral dissertation, "The Walled Up Wife" (opera, libretto and music by Lyons, 2005), for development and concert premiere. Her critically successful 2015 opera, A New Kind of Fallout, commissioned and premiered by the Opera Theater of Pittsburgh with a libretto by Tammy Ryan, addressed "in achingly human terms ... an artful perspective on an important matter [the dangers of pesticides]". Inspired by Rachel Carson's "Silent Spring," Lyons' music moves the opera well, fluently traversing distinctively characterized styles. She creates bright and open lines to start the opera and later when Alice and Jack exemplify a good marriage, and somewhat denser and more rhythmically agitated when there is conflict. Lyons' command of varied musical textures is masterful.

== Performer, impresario, educator ==
She made her professional debut as both vocal soloist and composer in her own orchestral song cycle "Feis" (poetry of Nuala Ní Dhomhnaill, 1997) with the American Symphony Orchestra, Leon Botstein conducting. She made her recording debut as the Maid in Daron Hagen's opera Shining Brow (Naxos, 2006) with the Buffalo Philharmonic, conducted by JoAnn Falletta. Of her performance, David Shengold, in Opera, UK, wrote, "Gilda Lyon’s clear soprano compels admiration."

Lyons founded the Phoenix Concerts, a New York City-based contemporary music performing and presenting organization, in 2005 and serves as its Artistic and Executive Director. The New Yorker describes it as "New York’s plucky Upper West Side new-music series". As of October 2014, Lyons had programmed music by over 160 composers on over fifty concerts. She has commissioned and performed premières of works by numerous living composers, including Kathryn Alexander, Juhi Bansal, Hayes Biggs, Robert Carl, Chen S’iang, Jesse D’Aiello, Stephen Dembski, Jed Distler, Kaeza Fearn, Daniel Felsenfeld, Daniel Gilliam, Daron Hagen, Wang Jie, Paula Kimper, Wendy Wan'ki Lee, Katarina Leyman, Eli Marshall, Jorge Martin, Daphna Mor, Frank Oteri, Glen Roven, David Rakowski, Jessica Rudman, She Ye, Faye-Ellen Silverman, Daniel Sonenberg, Dennis Tobenski, Craig Urquhart, Barbara White, Beth Wiemann, Peter Winkler, Randall Woolf, and Zhou Xu.

Lyons served as Assistant Executive Director of the New York New Music Ensemble (2006–2008) and Executive Director of the Lotte Lehmann Foundation (2008–2011). She has served as Adjunct Assistant Professor at Bronx Community College (2006–2012), as a Special Projects Instructor for Empire State College (2006–2008), and as a member of the composition faculty of the Seasons Music Festival Academy (2009–2012),

Since 2013, she has served as a Senior Artist Teacher with her own composition studio on the faculty of The Hartt School. In 2014, she joined the composition faculty of the Wintergreen Summer Music Festival and Academy.

== Compositions ==
Lyons has received commissions from, among others, the ASCAP Foundation / Charles Kingsford Fund, American Opera Projects, Amy Pivar Dances, the Beijing New Music Ensemble, ComposersCollaborative Inc., Fort Greene Park Conservancy, Paul Sperry, Two Sides Sounding, Adrienne Dandrich, Thomas Bagwell, the Finisterra Trio, Entelechron Trio, Kyo-Shin-An Arts, the 5 Borough Music Festival, the AIDS Quilt Songbook at Twenty, Mirror Visions, IonSound, Sweet Plantain String Quartet, and The Walt Whitman Project.

Lyons often turns to unusual sources for texts, and combines ritualistic chant and expanded vocal techniques. Tom Strini in the Milwaukee Journal Sentinel described "Nahuatl Hymn to the Earth Mother" for treble choir as “hair-raising, yet elegant, [with] slides, dips, yips and yelps amid ceremonial intensity." (Clarion CLCD-936) The wide range of her textual sources embraces poetry by grade school children in the Bronx "Songs from the F Train", (commissioned by American Opera Projects, and published by Schott, 2010), the Anne Sexton-inspired solo voice cycle "A Small Handful" (EC Schirmer, 2006), and even "transforms acronyms, route numbers and letters and a listing of transit-authority service changes into a comic soprano and mezzo-soprano duet [called] rapid transit".

She also incorporates visual imagery, as in the multi-media work "riverrun", (images by Holen Sabrina Kahn) and combines voice with pre-recorded sound, as in "walk, run, fly", which she premiered at The Flea Theater in New York City in 2012, and "Coney Run", in which she integrates piano, voices, and music concrete.

Schott Music, EC Schirmer, and Burning Sled Music publish her music. Recordings are available on the GPR and Clarion labels.
