= Lotte Lehmann =

German lyric soprano (1888–1976)

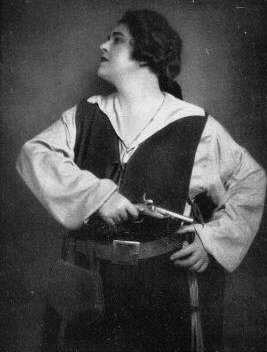
Lehmann in Beethoven's Fidelio

Charlotte "Lotte" Pauline Sophie Lehmann (February 27, 1888 – August 26, 1976) was a German-American dramatic soprano noted for her successful performances with international opera houses, on the recital stage and in teaching. She gave memorable appearances in the operas of Richard Strauss, Richard Wagner, Ludwig van Beethoven, Puccini, Mozart, and Massenet. The Marschallin in Der Rosenkavalier, Sieglinde in Die Walküre and the title-role in Fidelio are considered her greatest roles. During her long career, Lehmann also made almost five hundred recordings in both opera and art song.

== Life and career ==
Lehmann was born in Perleberg, a middle-sized town about halfway between Hamburg and Berlin, in the Province of Brandenburg, Germany.

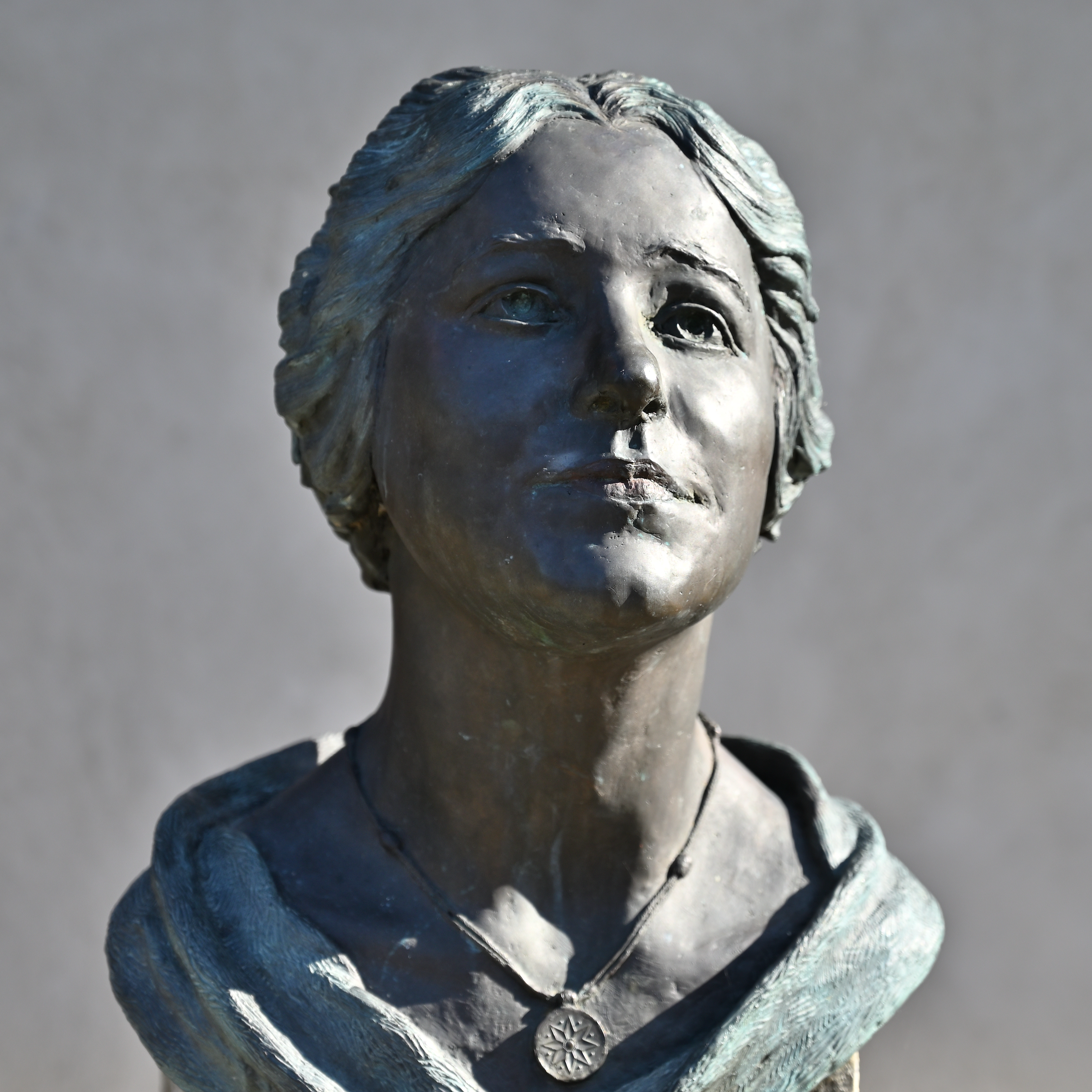
Lotte Lehmann bust in her birthplace Perleberg

She studied, unsuccessfully, at two music schools in Berlin, (where her family had moved), before finding Mathilde Mallinger (Wagner’s first Eva in Die Meistersinger) who within a year and a half developed Lehmann’s voice to the level at which she could audition for and achieve a beginner’s contract with the Hamburg Opera in 1910. At that time she sang roles of pages and other minor roles. By her third year in Hamburg Lehmann was singing important roles such as Agathe in Der Freischütz and Micaëla in Carmen. Her big break came when the absence of the soprano scheduled to sing Elsa in Lohengrin allowed Lehmann her first acknowledged success. She was coached in the role by the young assistant conductor at the Hamburg Opera, Otto Klemperer. Thereafter she further sang larger roles such as Irene in Rienzi, Antonia in Les contes d’Hoffmann, Dorabella in Così fan tutte and Gutrune in Götterdämmerung. In 1913, Hans Gregor, the director of the Vienna Court Opera, came to Hamburg to hear a tenor, but noticed Lehmann as Micäela and offered her a contract.

Lehmann began her Vienna career with a trial appearance in 1914 as Eva in Die Meistersinger von Nürnberg at the Vienna Court Opera – the later Vienna State Opera – which she joined in 1916. She quickly established herself as one of the company's brightest stars in roles such as Elisabeth in Tannhäuser and Elsa in Lohengrin.

She created roles in the world premieres of a number of operas by Richard Strauss, including the Composer in Ariadne auf Naxos in 1916 (later she sang the title-role in this opera), the Dyer's Wife in Die Frau ohne Schatten in 1919 and Christine in Intermezzo in 1924. Her other Strauss roles were the title-roles in Arabella (she sang in the Viennese premiere on 21 October 1933, even though her mother had died earlier that day) and in Der Rosenkavalier (earlier in her career, she had also sung the role of Sophie and Octavian; when she finally added the Marschallin to her repertoire, she became the first soprano in history to have sung all three female lead roles in that opera).

Her Puccini roles at the Vienna State Opera included the title-roles in Tosca, Manon Lescaut, Madama Butterfly, Suor Angelica, Turandot, Mimi in La bohème and Giorgetta in Il tabarro. In her 21 years with the company, Lehmann sang more than fifty different roles, including Marie/Marietta in Korngold's Die tote Stadt, the title-roles in La Juive by Fromental Halévy, Mignon by Ambroise Thomas, and Manon by Jules Massenet, Charlotte in Werther, Marguerite in Faust, Tatiana in Eugene Onegin and Lisa in The Queen of Spades.

In the meantime she had made her debut in London in 1914, sung on tour in South America in 1922, and from 1924 to 1935 performed regularly at the Royal Opera House, Covent Garden where aside from her famous Wagner roles and the Marschallin she also sang Desdemona in Otello and Donna Elvira in Don Giovanni. She appeared regularly at the Salzburg Festival from 1926 to 1937, performing with Arturo Toscanini, among other conductors. She also gave recitals there accompanied at the piano by the conductor Bruno Walter.

In August 1936, while in Salzburg, she discovered the Trapp Family Singers, later made more famous in the musical The Sound of Music. Lehmann had heard of a villa available for let and as she approached the villa she overheard the family singing in their garden. Insisting the children had a precious gift, she exclaimed that the family had "gold in their throats" and that they should enter the Salzburg Festival contest for group singing the following night. Having regard to the family's aristocratic background the Baron insisted performing in public was out of the question; however Lehmann's fame and genuine enthusiasm persuaded the Captain to relent, leading to their first public performance.

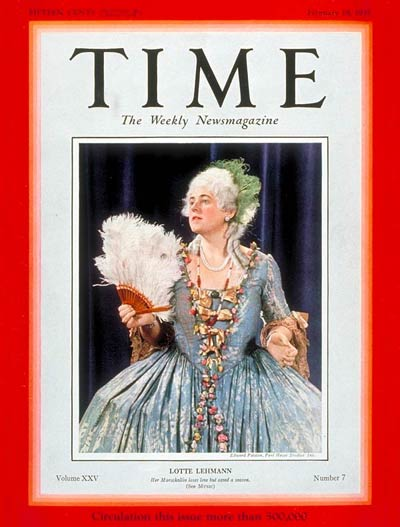
On the cover of Time magazine February 18, 1935

In 1930, Lehmann made her American debut in Chicago as Sieglinde in Wagner's Die Walküre. She returned to the United States every season thereafter making her Metropolitan Opera debut as Sieglinde in 1934. Before Germany annexed Austria in 1938, Lehmann emigrated to the United States. There, she continued to sing at the Metropolitan Opera until 1945 and the San Francisco Opera until 1946.

In addition to her operatic work, Lehmann was a renowned singer of lieder, giving frequent recitals throughout her career. She recorded and toured with pianist Ernő Balogh in the 1930s. Beginning with her first recital tour to Australia in 1937, she worked closely with the accompanist Paul Ulanowsky. He remained her primary accompanist for concerts and master classes until her retirement fourteen years later.

She also made a foray into film acting, playing the mother of Danny Thomas in MGM's Big City (1948), which also starred Robert Preston, George Murphy, Margaret O'Brien and Betty Garrett.

After her retirement from the recital stage in 1951, Lehmann taught master classes at the Music Academy of the West in Montecito, California, which she helped found in 1947. She also gave master classes in New York City's Town Hall (for the Manhattan School of Music), Chicago, London, Vienna, and other cities. Some of her most successful students included: Jeannine Altmeyer, Judith Beckmann, Grace Bumbry, William Cochran, Marilyn Horne, Mildred Miller, Norman Mittelmann, Carol Neblett, William Olvis, and Benita Valente. For her contribution to the recording industry, Lehmann has a star on the Hollywood Walk of Fame at 1735 Vine St. However, her first name is misspelled there as "Lottie."

She was a prolific author, publishing a book of poems Verse in Prosa in 1923, a novel, Orplid, mein Land in 1937, which appeared in English as Eternal Flight, and a book of memoirs, Anfang und Aufstieg (1937), which later appeared as On Wings of Song in the U.K. in 1938 and as Midway in My Song in the U.S. She also published More than Singing (1945), on the interpretation of song, and My Many Lives (1948), on the interpretation of opera roles. Later books included Five Operas and Richard Strauss, known as Singing with Richard Strauss in the U.K., a second book of poems in 1969, and Eighteen Song Cycles in 1971, consisting of material drawn largely from earlier works.

Lehmann was an active painter, especially in her retirement. Her painting included a series of twenty-four illustrations in tempera for each song of Schubert's Winterreise.

Lehmann died in 1976 at the age of 88 in Santa Barbara, California. She is interred in the Zentralfriedhof in Vienna. Her headstone is inscribed with a quote from Richard Strauss: "Sie hat gesungen, daß es Sterne rührte." ("She sang such that it moved the stars.")

== Personal life ==
In 1926 Lehmann married Otto Krause, a former officer in the Austrian army. They had no children. Krause, who died of tuberculosis in 1939, had four children from a previous marriage. Lehmann never remarried.

After Krause's death until her own death in 1976 Lehmann shared a home with Frances Holden (1899–1996), a psychologist who specialised in the study of genius, particularly that of classical musicians. The two women named their Santa Barbara house "Orplid" after the dream island described in Hugo Wolf's art song "Gesang Weylas".

She held a long correspondence with numismatist Dorothy B. Waage.

== Legacy ==
- Lehmann helped establish the Music Academy of the West in Santa Barbara, California, where there is a hall named for her.
- The Lotte Lehmann Concert Hall on the campus of the University of California, Santa Barbara was also named in her honor. She had given many master classes there.
- The Lotte Lehmann Collection at the UCSB Library's Special Collections contains Lehmann's recordings, papers, photos, etc.
- A collection of manuscripts, photos and recordings called the Gary Hickling Collection on Lotte Lehmann is housed at the Stanford Archive of Recorded Sound at Stanford University.
- The bulk of Lehmann's private recordings is held at the Miller Nichols Library Marr Sound Archives at the University of Missouri-Kansas City.
- Lehmann's friend Hertha Schuch willed her large collection (now in 18 boxes) of Lehmann recordings, correspondence, photos, etc. to the Austrian Theatre Museum in Vienna (Österreichisches Theatermuseum, Wien).
- The Lotte Lehmann Foundation was established in 1995 to preserve and perpetuate Lotte Lehmann's legacy and at the same time to bring art song into the lives of as many people as possible. It ceased activity in 2011. In 2011, the Lotte Lehmann League developed a website in her honor.
- In her native city, Perleberg, the Lotte Lehmann Akademie was established in her name in 2009. A summer program for young opera singers wishing to specialize in the German repertoire, the academy's faculty has included Karan Armstrong and Thomas Moser, both former students of Lehmann.

== Honors ==
- Lehmann received the title of Kammersängerin (the first singer to receive that designation since the collapse of the monarchy), 1926.
- Lehmann was made Ehrenmitglied der Wiener Staatsoper [Honorary Member of the Vienna State Opera], 1928.
- The King of Sweden conferred upon her the golden medal Literis et Artibus after a performance of Fidelio in February 1929.
- France awarded her the Légion d’honneur (“Offizier der Ehrenlegion”) 1931.
- Lehmann earned the Ehrenring der Stadt Wien [the Honor or Dedication Ring of the City of Vienna], 1962.
- From Germany, Lehmann received the “Großes Deutsches Verdienstkreuz” [the Great German Service Cross], 8 February 1964.
- Salzburg presented Lehmann with the Große Silbermedaille der Stadt Salzburg, [the Great Silver Medal of the City of Salzburg], 1969.

== Works ==
- Eighteen song cycles: studies in their interpretation (London: Cassell, 1971)
- Eternal Flight, translated by Elsa Krauch (NY: G.P. Putnam's Sons, 1937)
- Five operas and Richard Strauss. (New York, Macmillan Co. [1964])
- Midway in my Song: The Autobiography of Lotte Lehmann (NY: Bobbs-Merrill Company, 1938)
- More Than Singing: The Interpretation of Songs (Westport, CT: Greenwood Press, 1945)
- My Many Lives (NY: Boosey & Hawkes, 1948)

== Recordings ==
- Great Recordings of the Century: EMI: CDH 7610422: Lotte Lehmann: Operatic Arias
- Great Opera Recordings: NAXOS: 8.110250-51: Die Walküre: Acts I & II
- Immortal Performances: NAXOS: 8.110034-36: Der Rosenkavalier (live 1939)
- Great Opera Recordings: NAXOS: 8.110191-92: Der Rosenkavalier (1933)
- Great Singers: NAXOS: 8.11244: Lotte Lehmann: Lieder Recordings, Vol. 3
- Masterworks Portrait: Sony Music: MPK 47682: Lotte Lehmann: Songs from Vienna
- Masterworks Portrait: CBS: MPK 44840: Lotte Lehmann/Bruno Walter: Schumann: Frauenliebe und -Leben, Dichterliebe

== Sources ==
- Nigel Douglas, Legendary Voices (London: Deutsch, 1992)
- Beaumont Glass, Lotte Lehmann: A Life in Opera and Song (Santa Barbara, CA: Capra Press, 1988)
- Alan Jefferson, Lotte Lehmann, 1888–1976: A Centenary Biography (London : J. MacRae Books, 1988); German version: Lotte Lehmann: Eine Biographie (1991)
- Michael H. Kater, Never Sang for Hitler: The Life and Times of Lotte Lehmann (NY: Cambridge University Press, 2008)
- Kathy H. Brown, "Lotte Lehmann in America: Her Legacy as Artist Teacher" (Missoula, Montana: The College Music Society, 2012)
