= Le prophète =

1849 opera by Giacomo Meyerbeer

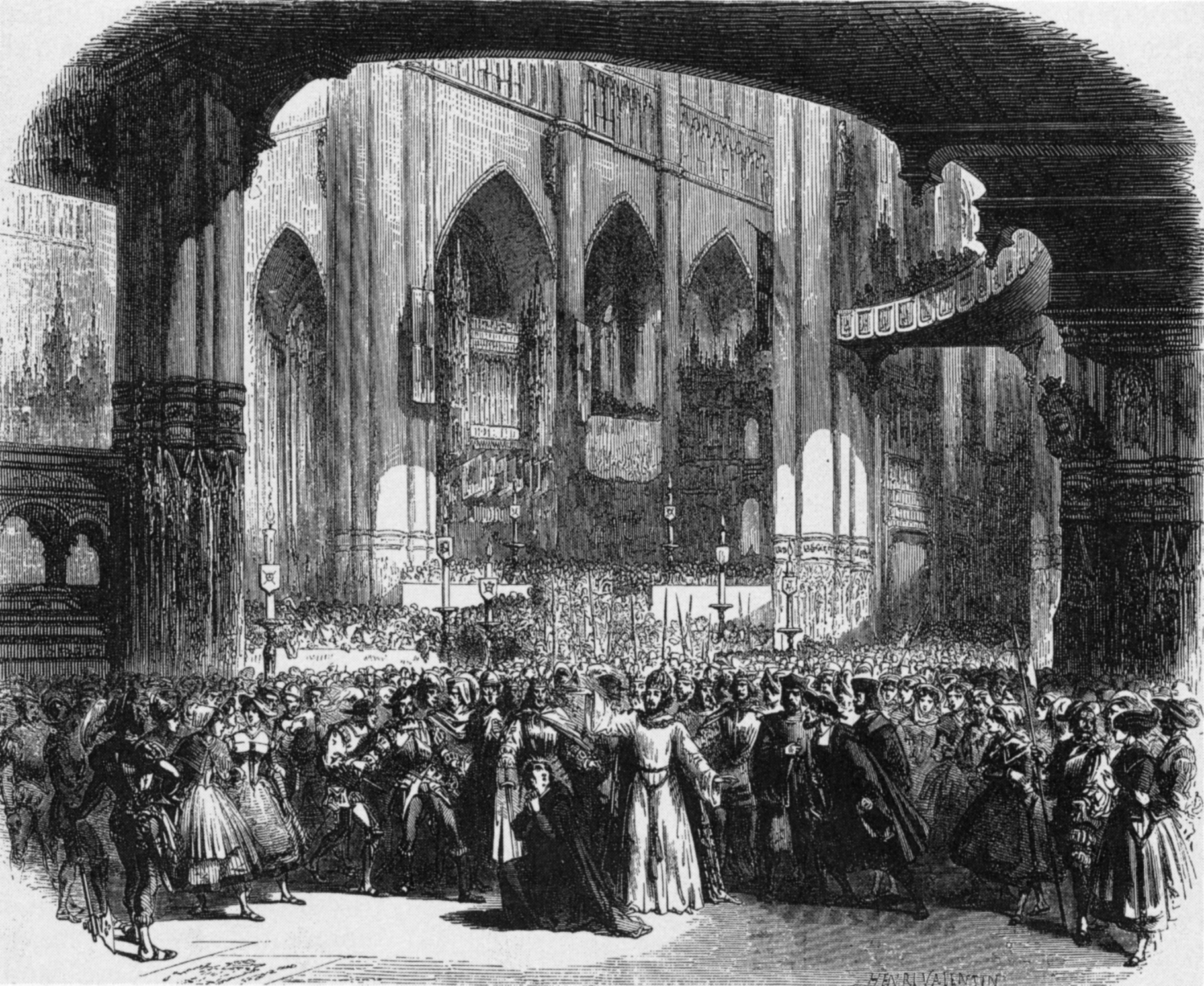
Act 4, scene 2 of the original production, set design by Charles-Antoine Cambon and Joseph Thierry

Le prophète (The Prophet) is a grand opera in five acts by Giacomo Meyerbeer, which was premiered in Paris on 16 April 1849. The French-language libretto was by Eugène Scribe and Émile Deschamps, after passages from the Essay on the Manners and Spirit of Nations by Voltaire. The plot is based on the life of John of Leiden, Anabaptist leader and self-proclaimed "King of Münster" in the 16th century.

== Composition ==
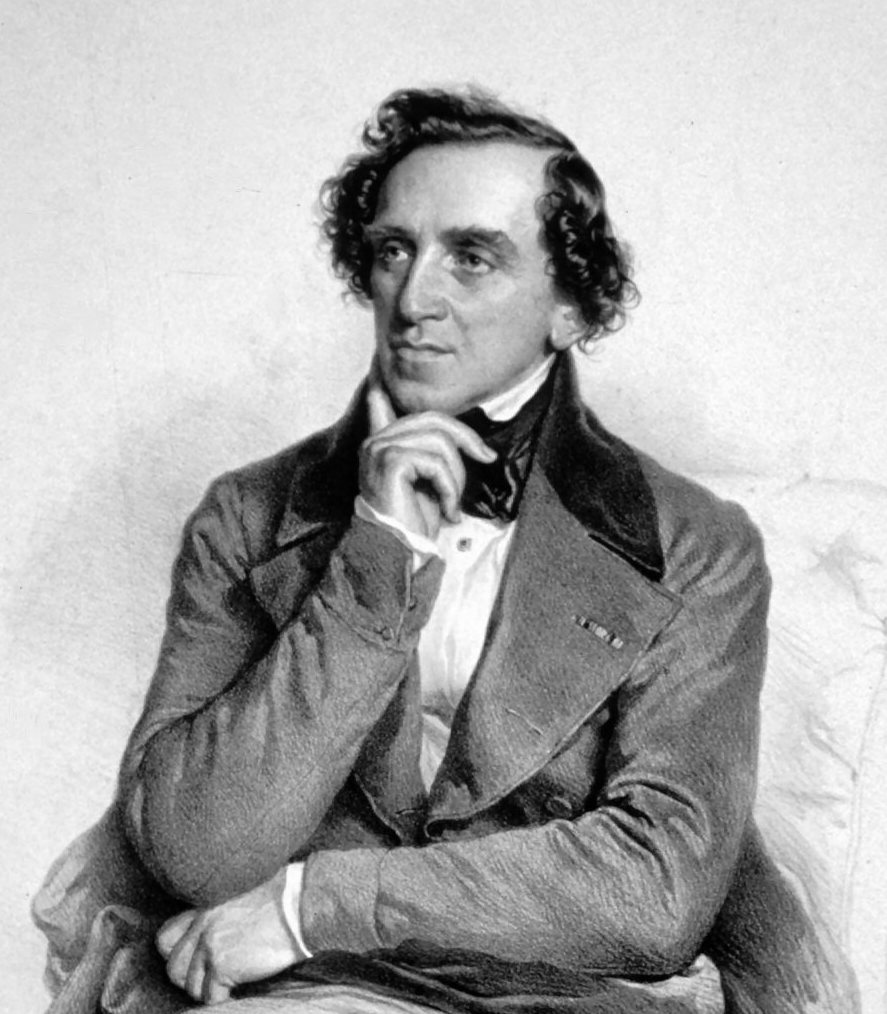
Giacomo Meyerbeer, portrayed in 1847

After the brilliant success of their grand opera Les Huguenots (1836), Meyerbeer and his librettist Scribe decided to collaborate again on a piece based on a historical religious conflict. Meyerbeer's great personal wealth and his duties as official court composer to King Frederick William IV of Prussia meant that there was no hurry to complete the opera; the composition and planning took more than a decade.

== Performance history ==
Le prophète was first performed by the Paris Opera at the Salle Le Peletier on 16 April 1849. The production featured costumes by Paul Lormier and sets by Charles-Antoine Cambon and Joseph Thierry (acts 1 and 4), Charles Séchan (acts 2 and 5), and Édouard Desplechin (act 3). It involved the first use ever on stage of Léon Foucault and Jules Duboscq's electric arc light (régulateur à arc électrique), imitating the effect of sunlight.

The creators of the three main roles were Jeanne-Anaïs Castellan as Berthe, Pauline Viardot as Fidès, and Gustave-Hippolyte Roger as Jean. A sensational success at its premiere, the second city to hear it was London, at Covent Garden on 24 July of the same year. It was given all over Germany in 1850, as well as in Vienna, Lisbon, Antwerp, New Orleans, Budapest, Brussels, Prague and Basel. Its tremendous success continued throughout the 19th and into the early 20th century. Contralto Marie Goetze was a celebrated interpreter of the role of Fides and performed the role at many theaters; among them the Metropolitan Opera (1890) and the Vienna State Opera (1891).

Like Meyerbeer's other operas, Le prophète lost favor in the early part of the twentieth century and it fell out of the operatic repertoire worldwide, except for very occasional revivals. The Metropolitan Opera revived the opera in 1918 as a vehicle for star tenor Enrico Caruso. Since the Second World War, notable productions have included: Zürich in 1962, Deutsche Opera Berlin in 1966 (both starring Sandra Warfield and James McCracken) and the Metropolitan Opera in 1977 with Marilyn Horne as Fidès, directed by John Dexter. A production of the opera by Hans Neuenfels was performed at the Vienna State Opera in 1998 with Plácido Domingo and Agnes Baltsa in the leading roles. Beginning in 2015, new productions of Le prophète would appear in European opera houses.

== Roles ==
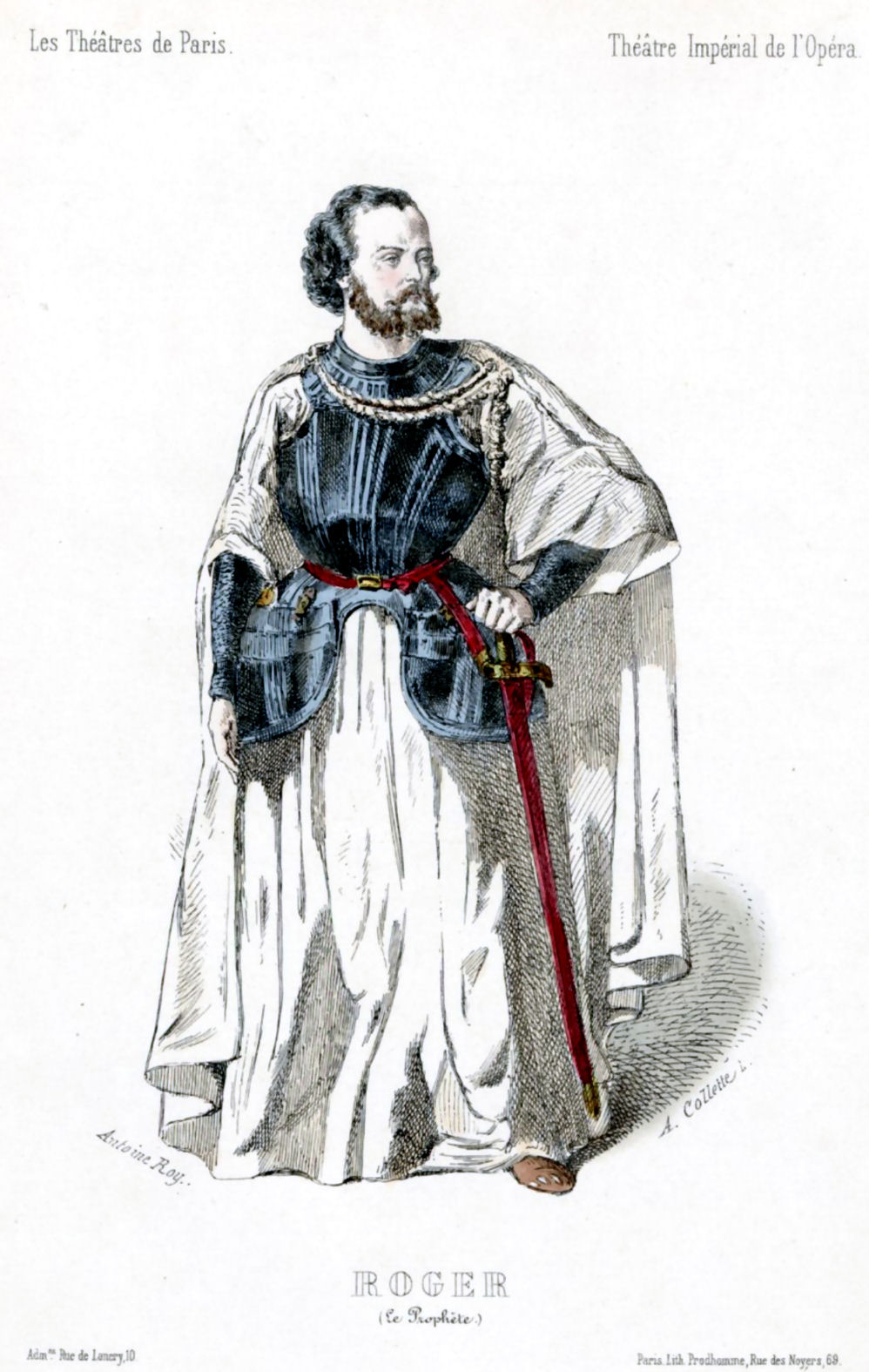
Gustave-Hippolyte Roger as Jean de Leyde in the original production of Le prophète

Roles, voice types, and premiere cast
Role	Voice type	Premiere cast, 16 April 1849 (Conductor: Narcisse Girard)
Jean de Leyde	tenor	Gustave-Hippolyte Roger
Fidès, Jean's mother	mezzo-soprano	Pauline Viardot
Berthe, Jean's bride	soprano	Jeanne-Anaïs Castellan
Jonas, an Anabaptist	tenor	Louis Guéymard
Mathisen, an Anabaptist	bass or baritone	Euzet
Zacharie, an Anabaptist	bass	Nicolas Levasseur
Oberthal, a feudal count	bass	Hippolyte Bremond
Nobles, citizens, Anabaptists, peasants, soldiers, prisoners, children

== Synopsis ==
Time: The religious wars of the 16th century
Place: Dordrecht and Münster

Precis: Jean de Leyde (based on the historical John of Leiden), whose beloved, Berthe, is coveted by Count Oberthal, ruler of Dordrecht, is persuaded by a trio of sinister Anabaptists to proclaim himself king in Münster.

Meyerbeer originally wrote a long overture for the opera which was cut during rehearsals, along with various other sections of the work, due to the excessive length of the opera itself. For over a century, the overture was thought to survive only in piano arrangements made at Meyerbeer's request by Charles-Valentin Alkan, but Meyerbeer's manuscript full score was rediscovered in the Bibliothèque Nationale in Paris in the early 1990s; the original parts were discovered in the archives of the Paris Opèra shortly thereafter and a newly edited edition was published in 2010.

=== Act 1 ===
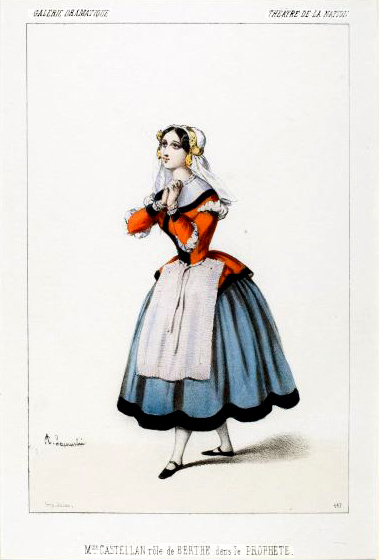
Jeanne-Anaïs Castellan as Berthe in the original production of Le prophète

The countryside around Dordrecht in Holland. At the bottom flows the Meuse. On the right, Oberthal's castle with a drawbridge and turrets; on the left, the farms and mills connected with the castle.

It is morning. The peasants and millers leave to work, the wings of the mills begin to turn (Prelude and pastoral chorus: La brise est muette). Berthe, a young peasant girl, is very happy to be able to marry the man she loves (Aria: Mon cœur s'élance et palpite). She welcomes her future mother-in-law, Fidès, who blesses her and puts an engagement ring on her finger. Berthe explains to Fidès that she needs the Count's permission to marry Jean whom she has loved ever since he rescued her from the Meuse. Before leaving for Leiden, where Fidès runs an inn with her son, Berthe must obtain permission from Oberthal to leave the country and to marry. The two women head for the count's castle, but stop at the sight of three men dressed in black. These are three Anabaptists, Jonas, Matthisen and Zacharie, singing their chorale, Ad nos ad salutarem (to a tune created by Meyerbeer). The Anabaptists arouse the interest of the local peasants in their ideas of social revolution and urge them to revolt against their overlord. The peasants arm themselves with pitchforks and sticks and make for the castle, but all stop at the sight of the Count of Oberthal and his soldiers. Seeing Berthe, Oberthal asks the girl about the reasons for her presence. Berthe explains that she has loved Fidès' son Jean since he saved her from drowning and asks his permission to marry. Oberthal however recognizes one of the Anabaptists, Jonas, as a former steward and orders soldiers to beat the three men. Taken by Berthe's beauty, he refuses her request and arrests the two women. The people become angry, and with the returning Anabaptists, threaten the castle.

=== Act 2 ===
The interior of the inn of Jean and Fidès in the suburbs of Leiden in Holland. At the back, a door with crosses overlooking the countryside. Doors to the right and left of the stage

The Anabaptists enter with merrymaking peasants and try to persuade Jean that he is their destined leader, claiming that he closely resembles the picture of King David in Münster Cathedral. Jean recounts to them a dream in which he was in a temple with people kneeling before him. Jean tells the three Anabaptists that he lives only for his love for Berthe and refuses to join with them (Aria: Pour ma Berthe, moi je soupire); they leave. Berthe hurries in, having fled Oberthal; the Count next arrives and threatens to execute Jean's mother Fidès unless Berthe is returned to him. In despair, Jean gives in and hands over Berthe to Oberthal. Fidès blesses her son and attempts to console him (Aria: Ah! mon fils sois béni). When the Anabaptists return, Jean is ready to join them in vengeance against Oberthal; he goes, without letting Fidès know (Quartet: Oui, c'est Dieu qui t'appelle).

=== Act 3 ===
==== Scene 1 ====
The camp of the Anabaptists in a forest of Westphalia. A frozen pond extends to the horizon lost in the mist and is bordered to the left and right of the scene by the forest. On the banks of the pond are erected the tents of the Anabaptists

Jean has been proclaimed to be a prophet. Anabaptist soldiers bring in a group of prisoners made up of richly clothed nobles and monks, whom they are threatening with axes. All the captives were going to be massacred, but Mathisen intervened and reminded the other Anabaptists that it would be better to execute them only once their ransom had been demanded and paid. Farmers arrive, skating across the frozen pond, bringing food which has been paid for with money stolen from the captives. The farmers are invited by the Anabaptist soldiers to celebrate with them (Ballet and chorus).

==== Scene 2 ====
The interior of the tent of Zacharie, a few moments later

The Anabaptists determine to seize Münster; their decision is overheard by Oberthal who has entered the camp in disguise. He pretends that he wants to join the Anabaptists and Zacharie and Jonas then make him swear to respect the peasants and the poor, but to mercilessly massacre the nobles and the burghers, after having stripped them of their wealth (Comic trio: Sous votre bannière que faudra-t-il faire?). On his detection, he is arrested; but, when he informs Jean that Berthe escaped from his clutches and he has seen her alive in Münster, Jean, wearying of the violence and bloodshed caused by the Anabaptist campaign, cancels the order for his execution.

==== Scene 3 ====
The Anabaptists' camp

An attack on Münster led by the three Anabaptists fails, and the returning rabble are rebellious. However, Jean, as Prophet and Leader, inspires the Anabaptist troops with a celestial vision of their impending success (Triumphal hymn: Roi du ciel et des anges).

=== Act 4 ===
==== Scene 1 ====
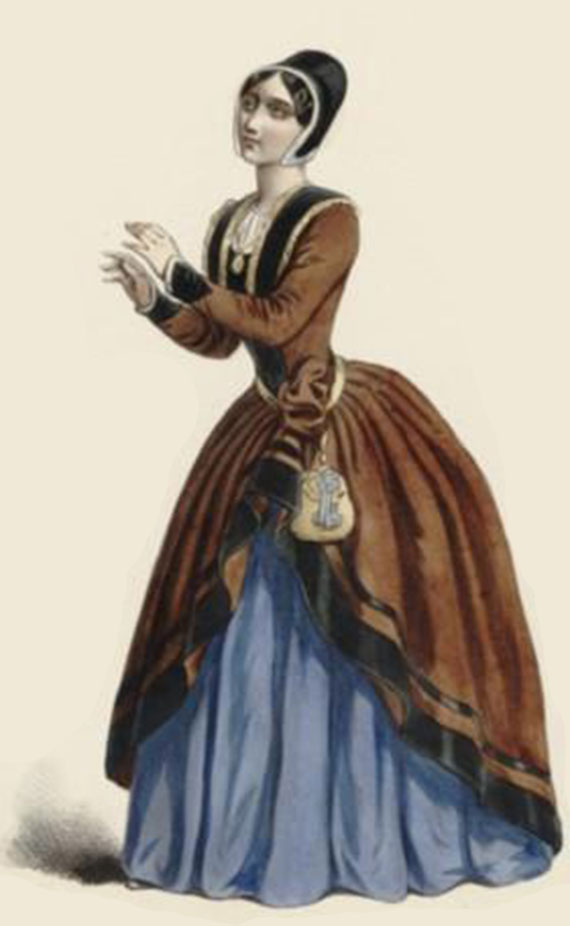
Pauline Viardot as Fidès in the original production of Le prophète

The town hall of Münster, where several streets end. To the right, a few steps leading to the door of the town hall

Jean, who wishes to make himself Emperor, has taken the city, whose citizens are in despair at his rule. Fidès sits on a pillar and begs for alms to pay for a Mass for the rest of her son, whom she thinks dead. Berthe, dressed in pilgrim's clothes, arrives in the square. She recognizes Fidès and the two women fall into each other's arms. Berthe relates that after she managed to escape from the Count of Oberthal, she sought Jean and her mother in their inn in Leiden. Neighbors told her they would have gone to Münster. Berthe immediately set out to try to find them. Fidès then tells the girl that her son died: she found only his bloodied clothes while an unknown person claimed to have witnessed his assassination ordered by the prophet of the Anabaptists. Berthe then decides to assassinate the prophet, while Fidès prays God to bring her son eternal rest. Exalted, the girl runs to the palace of the prophet while Fidès tries in vain to catch up (Duet: Pour garder à ton fils le serment).

==== Scene 2 ====
Inside Münster Cathedral

The second scene is Jean's coronation in the cathedral and is preceded by a Coronation March, during which the crown, the scepter, the sword of justice, and the seal of the State, are handed over to Jean. Fidès is determined to carry out Berthe's plan for revenge; entering the cathedral, she curses the Anabaptists' prophet (Prayer and imprecation: Domine salvum fac regem). The coronation ends while the crowd marvels at the miracles already accomplished by the prophet and acclaim him as the Son of God, not conceived by woman (Children's chorus with general chorus: Le voilà, le roi prophète). When Fidès hears Jean say that he is anointed by God, she recognizes his voice and cries out "My son!". This threatens Jean's plan and he pretends not to know her. He calls on his followers to stab him if the beggar woman claims again to be his mother. This forces Fidès to retract, saying her eyes have deceived her.

=== Act 5 ===
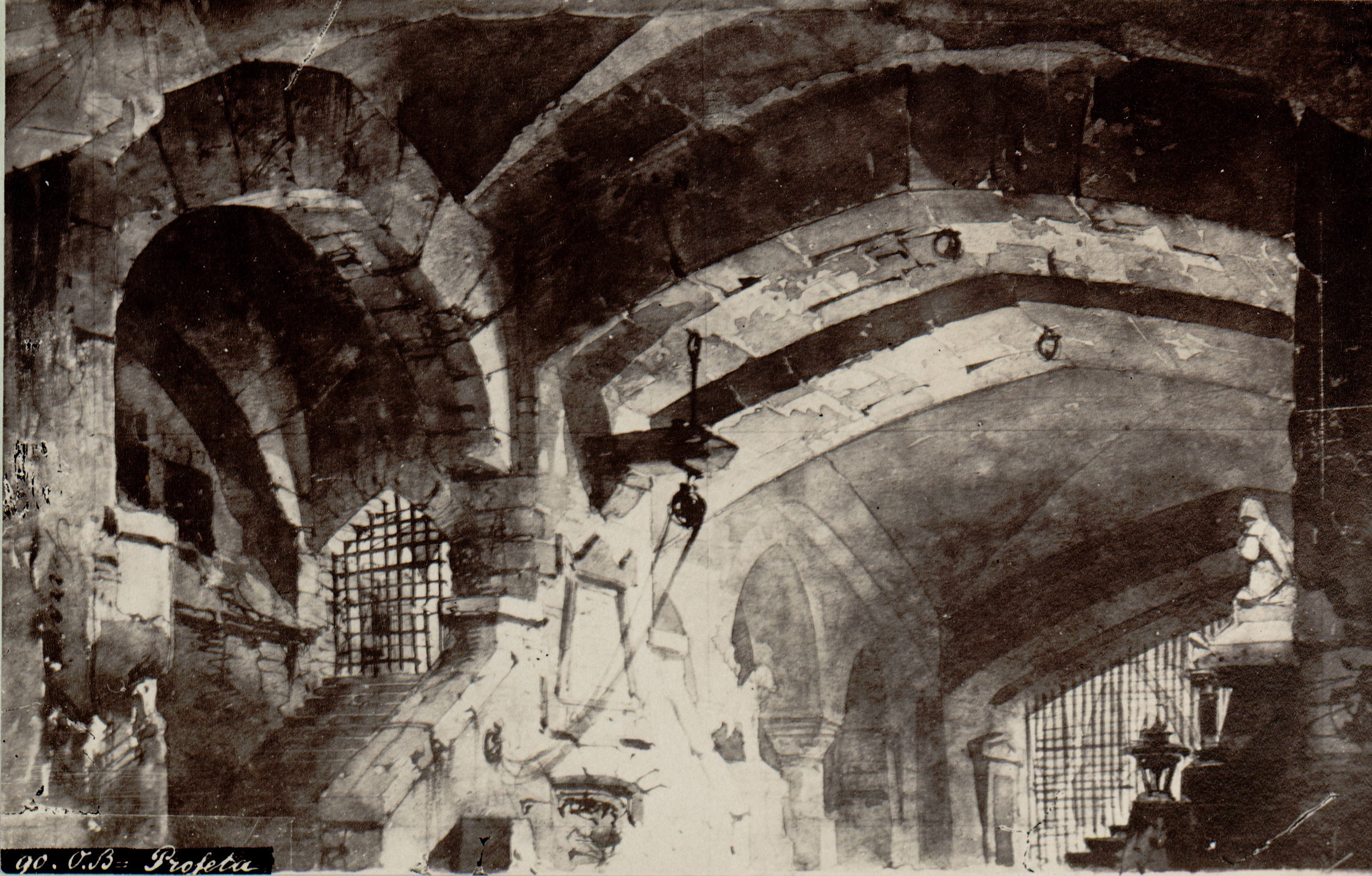
Sotterraneo a volta nel palazzo di Münster, set design for Il profeta act 5 scene 6 (1863)

==== Scene 1 ====
A vault in Jean's palace in Münster: on the left, a staircase through which one descends into the vault. To the right, an iron gate opening onto a tunnel that leads out of the city

"Ô, Prêtres de Baal" (Fidès, act 5)
Ernestine Schumann-Heink (1907)

The Anabaptist trio resolve to hand over Jean to the German Imperial armies, which are preparing to invade the city, to buy their own protection. Soldiers bring Fidès to the vault where she is held prisoner. She is torn apart by contradictory feelings: she still loves her son, but she loathes what he has become, a false prophet who pretends to be the son of God and who leads armies responsible for many crimes. Finally, Fidès seems ready to forgive the faults of her son, while wishing that death should come to free her from all her ills (Aria: Ô prêtres de Baal). A soldier announces to Fidès the visit of the prophet. She then regains a little hope and prays for her son to repent and take the right way. Jean finally arrives and asks his mother to forgive him. Fidès reproaches her son for his behavior. Jean tries to justify himself by recalling that he wished to avenge himself for the oppressions of the earl of Oberthal. The only way for Jean to obtain pardon from his mother is to give up his power and wealth and no longer claim to be a prophet. At first reluctant to abandon all those who trusted him, Jean is gradually convinced. He agrees to follow his mother who forgives all his faults (Grand duet: Mon fils? je n'en ai plus!) Informed by a member of her family about the existence of secret passages, Berthe enters the vault in order to access the powder magazine and blow up the palace and all its inhabitants. As soon as she sees Jean, she throws herself into his arms and is about to flee with him and Fidès, abandoning her avenging mission. Jean, Berthe and Fidès, finally united, dream of their future life, peaceful and full of bliss. (Trio: Loin de la ville). A soldier, however, enters and warns Jean that the Imperial troops, assisted by the three Anabaptists, have invaded the city and entered the palace. Berthe realizes suddenly that Jean and the prophet are one and the same person. Shocked, she curses her fiancé and then stabs herself to death. Having lost forever the one he loved, Jean decides to die as well and to drag all his enemies to death.

==== Scene 2 ====
The great hall of the Münster palace. A table placed on a platform rises in the middle of the stage

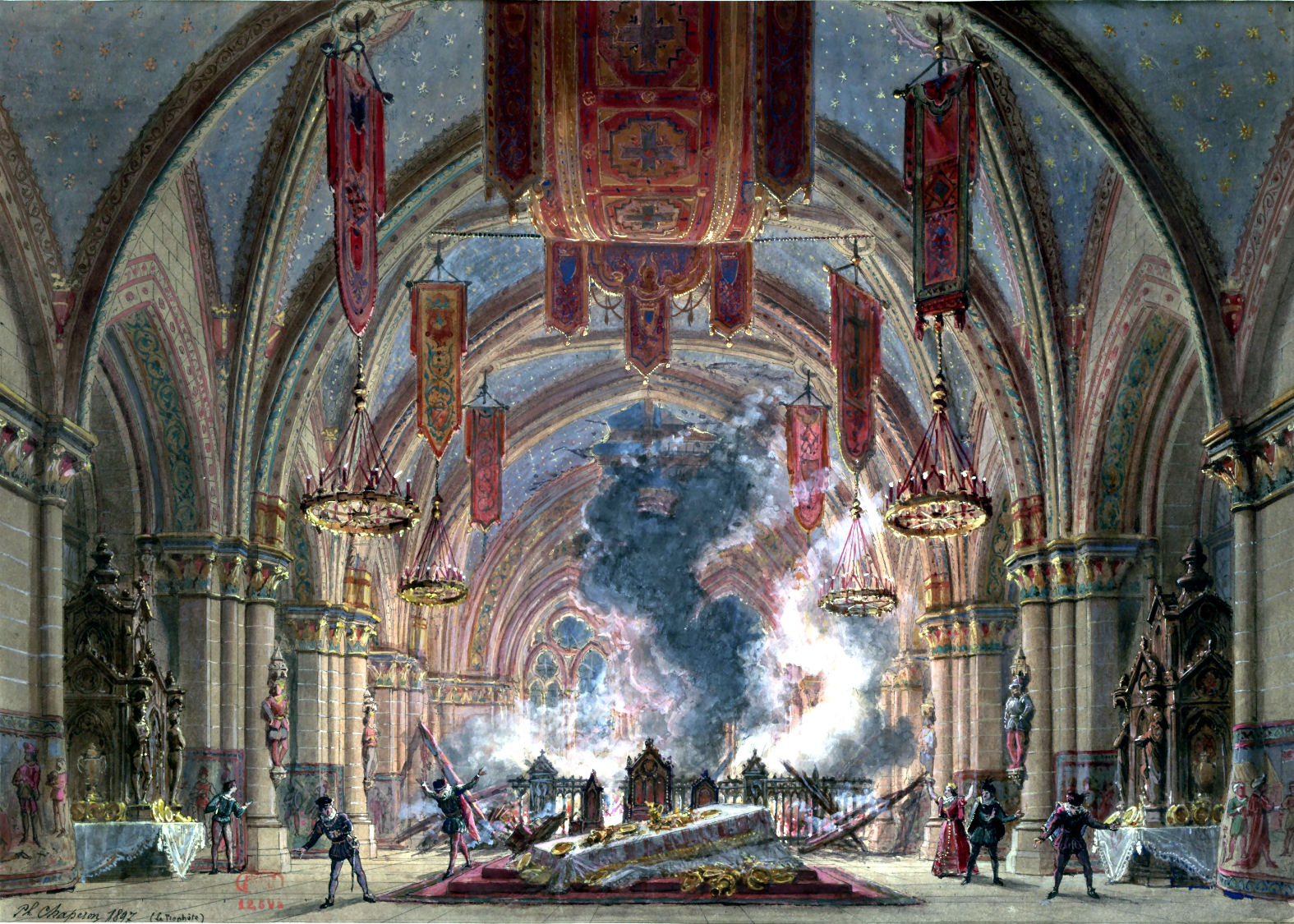
Design by Philippe Chaperon for the final scene in a production of the opera in 1897

The Anabaptist soldiers feast and sing of the glory of their prophet at the banquet to celebrate his coronation. Young girls dance for them while others bring them wine and food (Bacchanale/choral dance: Gloire, gloire au prophète) The three Anabaptists are watching Jean hoping that he will be drunk enough to be easily captured. Jean, for his part, warns his soldiers that they must be ready to close all the doors of the palace as soon as they receive his order. Jean encourages all to get drunk and asks the three Anabaptists to stand by his side as a reward for their fidelity (Drinking song: Versez, que tout respire l'ivresse). Suddenly, Oberthal at the head of imperial soldiers appears in the hall. He demands that the false prophet be executed without delay, a request which the three Anabaptists eagerly approve. In the confusion, nobody realizes that the doors of the palace have all been closed. A huge explosion then occurs and the flames grow from all sides. A wall collapses, allowing Fidès to join her son. Jean and his mother throw themselves into each other's arms for a last farewell, while all try in vain to escape from the conflagration that spreads more and more. The palace collapses in smoke and flames, killing all within (Final duet with chorus: Ah! viens, divine flamme).

== Analysis ==
=== Dark and complex libretto ===
==== Pessimistic worldview ====
The richness and complexity of the libretto particularly impressed contemporaries at the creation of the work. Noted writer and literary critic Théophile Gautier began his review of the premiere in La Presse by noting that "the choice of the libretto is ... for Meyerbeer of major importance" and that "Meyerbeer is the most dramatic composer ever heard at the Opera: he has the highest level of theatrical understanding, ... and that is, in our opinion, the distinctive quality of his genius." Many of the critics of the time are struck by the correspondence between the libretto of Le prophète and the post-revolutionary period of the years 1848 to 1849 in France. T. Gautier notes that "the Anabaptists and the peasants have dialogue that might be taken from the pages of the Communist newspapers". As Meyerbeer himself acknowledged, the general tone of the work is "sombre and fanatical". The view of the world conveyed by the opera is particularly pessimistic: the three Anabaptists advocate revolution only in their own interest; too cowardly to expose themselves directly, they seek a charismatic leader whom they will not hesitate to betray when they feel the wind turn. But the old system against which the Anabaptists rise is far from being presented in a favorable manner: it is even, in the person of the Count of Oberthal, very clearly condemned for his arbitrariness, his injustice and the abuses of power which are inherent. As for the people, they are characterized successively by their cowardice (in the first act) and their bloody brutality (at the beginning of the third). Just before disappearing into the flames, Jean de Leiden states the "moral" of the opera:

(To the Anabaptists) You, traitors!
(to Oberthal) You, tyrant, whom I lead in my fall!
God dictated your end ... and I execute it! All are guilty ... and all are punished!

==== No heroes nor love story ====
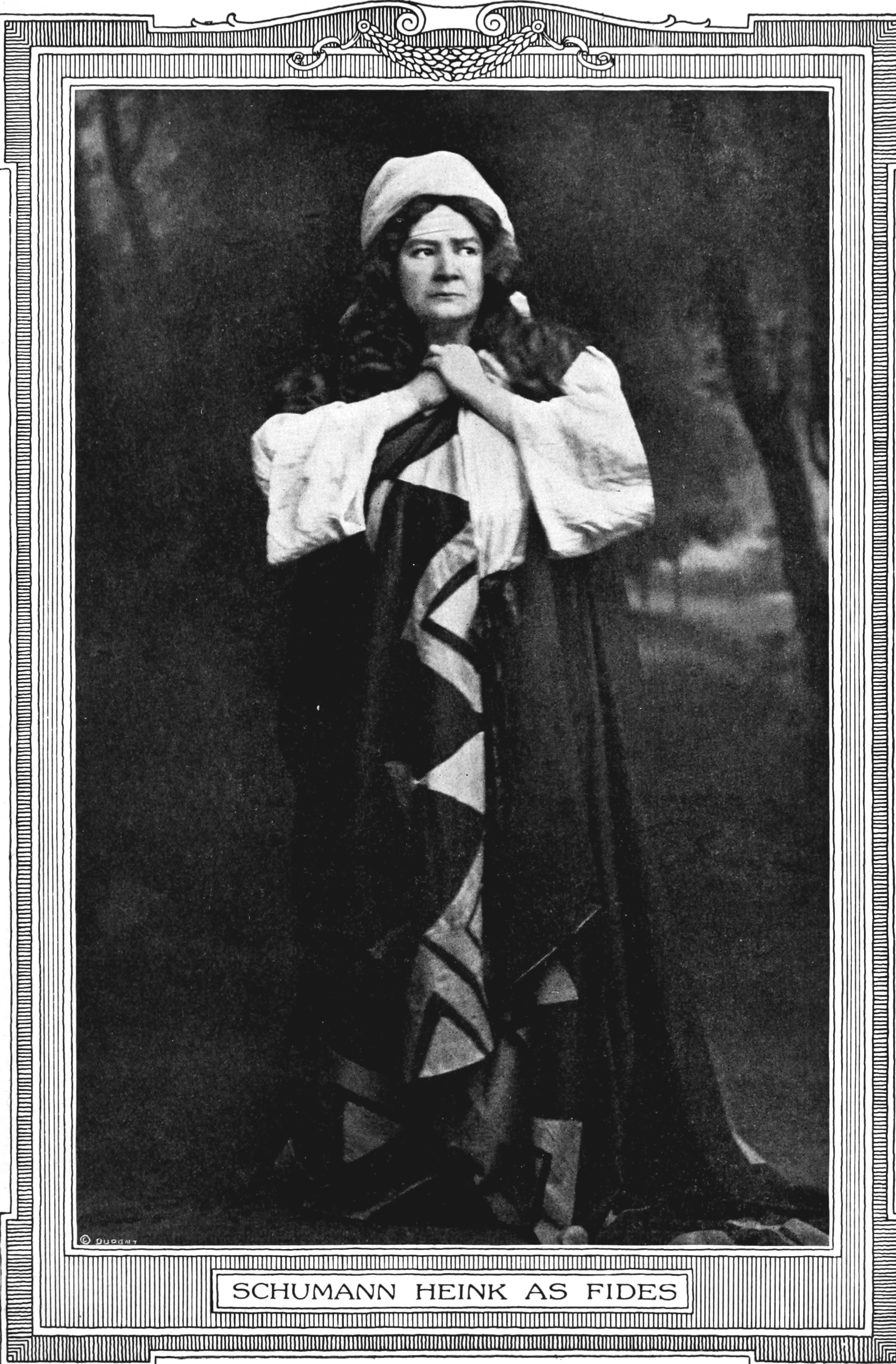
Ernestine Schumann-Heink as Fidès

In contrast to the usual opera texts of the day, the love story is very clearly in the background in the libretto. Scribe prefers to focus on characters with unusually detailed psychology.

The first of these characters is the "hero" (or rather the anti-hero) Jean of Leiden. The deepest nature of the character remains ultimately ambiguous: does he truly believe in the mission that God is said to have entrusted to him (in the prophetic dream of the second act, the vision of his victorious attack on Münster at the end of the third, and the coronation ceremony)? Or does he know that he is ultimately only a usurper who takes advantage of circumstances (hence his bad conscience and his repentance when he confronts his mother in the last act)? Does he really believe in the ideals of equality and social justice he defends? Or does he only act out of vengeance? Is he manipulated by the three Anabaptists? Or is he constantly controlling the situation? The libretto does not say.

According to musical historian Robert Letellier, Scribe would have been inspired by the character of the false Dmitri in the drama Boris Godunov of Pushkin published in 1831 to create his portrait of Jean of Leiden, torn between his sincere religious faith and his imposture as a prophet and son of God. The libretto also mentions twice the character of Joan of Arc; in the second act she is referred to as an example of a war leader acting in the name of faith; in the third, this reference highlights the cruel failure of Jean, who, by his own admission, only directs a group of executioners, while "Joan of Arc, in her footsteps, has given birth to heroes."

The second remarkable figure in the libretto is Fidès, the mother of John. This is the main female character, much more original than the conventional figure of Berthe, Jean's fiancée. Fidès is a devout woman who loves her son and tries to save him many times, even if she has to deny her motherhood and accuse herself of lying when she is not. The scene where Fidès questions the divine origin of her son during the coronation is a direct echo of the scene in Schiller's play The Maid of Orleans, which appeared in 1801, where the father of Joan of Arc accuses his daughter of sorcery at the coronation in Reims of Charles VII. With rare exceptions, Meyerbeer does not entrust the character with particularly virtuosic music; he prefers to invent a kind of lyrical declamation that reinforces the credibility and dignity of this role as a mother. On the musical level, the role is particularly difficult and was specifically written for the rare voice of Pauline Viardot.

Finally, the trio of the Anabaptists, who act, speak and move as if they were only one person, is, for Robert Letellier, an invention of great originality. Perhaps intended as a caricature of the Holy Trinity, the trio personifies hypocrisy, treason and the dangers of demagogy.

=== Music ===
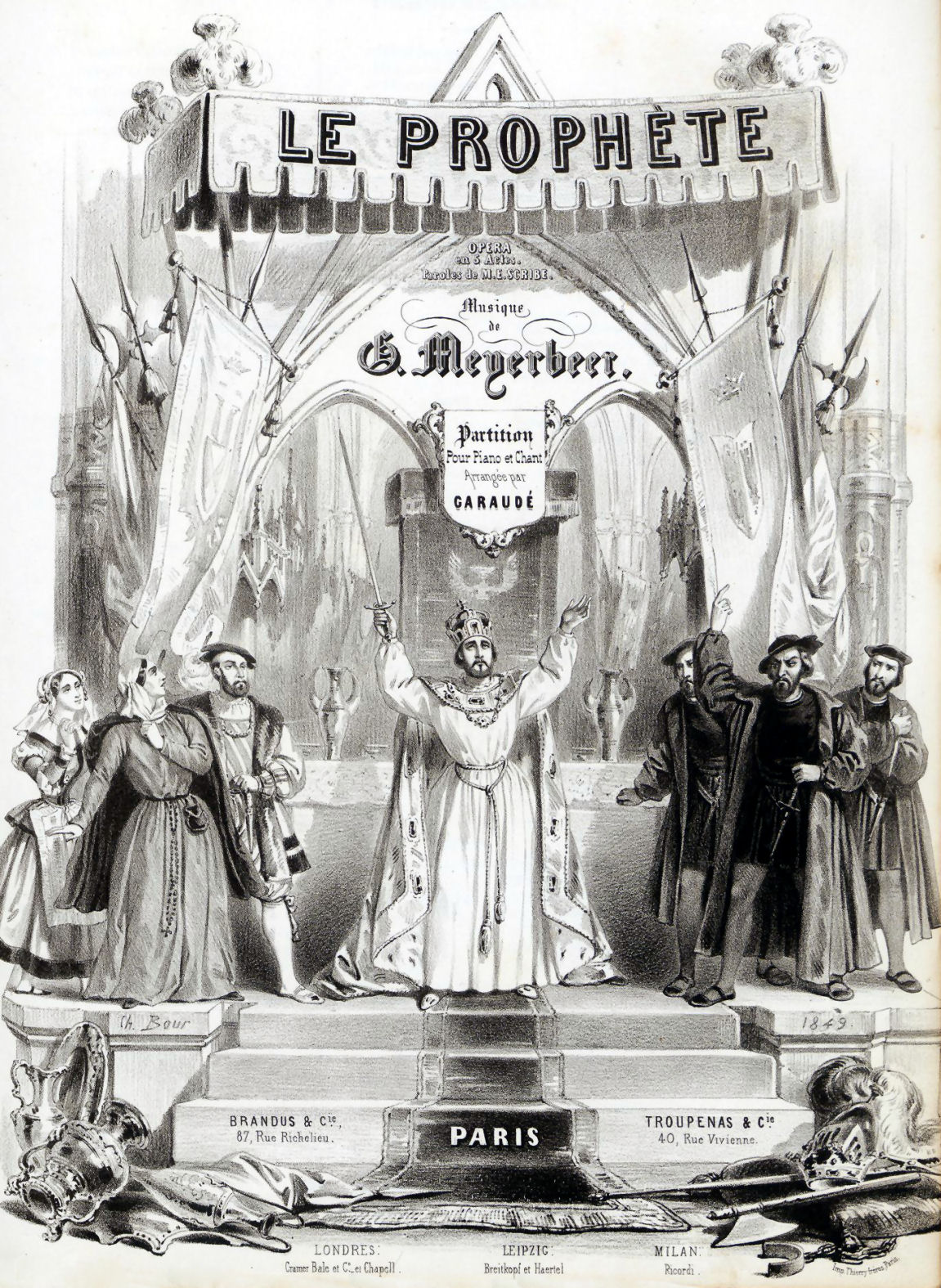
Frontispiece of the original vocal score

The musical unity of the work is established by the existence of some recurring themes: the main one is the Anabaptist hymn "Ad nos, ad salutarem undam, iterum venite miseri", which is heard in the first act with the sinister appearance of the three Anabaptists. It reappears in the third act when Jean calms his troops who have just suffered a defeat, while preparing them for new battles. Finally, the theme appears again at the beginning of the last act as the three Anabaptists plan to betray the "prophet". Another theme used as a recurring motif relates to the role of prophet taken up by Jean. It is heard for the first time in a distorted form in the second act when Jean recounts the dream that haunts him. Then it is heard again, with a different tone and rhythm, in the coronation march of the fourth act.

The many novel orchestral effects of the score were much admired by the composer Hector Berlioz in his review of the original production.

Of the vocal music, the trio in the second scene of act 3 is particularly notable for the original way in which a serious situation is set by Meyerbeer to a comic trio. Count Oberthal has come in the dark to the Anabaptist camp hoping to infiltrate their group and disrupt their plans. The Anabaptists Zacharie and Jonas at first do not recognise him, and in the trio Oberthal swears, to a catchy tune, that he wants to execute as many aristocrats as he can while the Anabaptists gaily add "tra-la-las". But, holding a lamp to Oberthal's face, Jonas recognises his enemy and the same seemingly jolly music is repeated, to sardonic effect, as the two Anabaptists swear to kill him and Oberthal expresses his hatred of them.

A critical edition of the score was published in 2011.

== Influence ==
The musical and theatrical influences of the opera can be felt in, amongst others, Liszt's monumental Fantasy and Fugue on the chorale "Ad nos, ad salutarem undam" for organ which is based on the Anabaptists' chorale, the duet between mother and lost child in Giuseppe Verdi's Il trovatore, and the catastrophic finale of Richard Wagner's Götterdämmerung. The tremendous success of Le prophète at its Paris première also provoked Wagner's anti-Jewish attack on Meyerbeer, Das Judenthum in der Musik.

== Ballet ==
The first scene of act 3 of Le prophète contains a ballet, titled "Les Patineurs", in which the dancers mimic ice skaters. In this opera's premiere in 1849, the dancers wore a type of primitive inline roller skates, which had been invented in Europe in the previous century, to more convincingly look like they were ice skating (quad roller skates had not yet been invented). In 1937, Constant Lambert arranged the ballet music of this opera and excerpts from the ballet music of L'étoile du nord into the ballet Les Patineurs, choreographed by Sir Frederick Ashton, in which the dancers mimic ice skaters.

== Orchestration ==
- Pit orchestra
  - Strings: First violins, second violins, violas, cellos, double basses, 2 harps
  - Woodwinds: 1 piccolo, 2 flutes, 2 oboes, 1 cor anglais, 2 clarinets, 1 bass clarinet, 4 bassoons
  - Keyboard: 1 organ, 4 hands
  - Brass: 4 French horns, 4 trumpets (natural and piston), 3 trombones, 1 ophicleide
  - Percussion: timpani (3 sets for the finale of the third act), triangle, cymbals, tam-tam, bass drum, snare drum
- Stage band (coronation scene)
  - 18 saxhorns (2 sopraninos in Eb, 4 sopranos in Bb, 4 altos in Eb, 2 baritones in Bb, 4 basses in Bb, 2 contrabasses in Eb), 2 cornets, 2 trumpets, 4 military drums, antique cymbals (played by the children's chorus)

== Recordings ==
- 1976: James McCracken (Jean de Leyde), Marilyn Horne (Fidès), Renata Scotto (Berthe), Jean Dupouy (Jonas), Christian Du Plessis (Mathisen), Jerome Hines (Zacharie), Jules Bastin (Oberthal); Ambrosian Opera Chorus, Royal Philharmonic Orchestra, Henry Lewis, conductor. Recorded 1976. Sony CD Cat:88875194782.
- 2017: First recording of the new critical edition: John Osborn (Jean), Marianne Cornetti (Fides), Lynette Tapia (Berthe), Albrecht Kludszuweit (Jonas), Pierre Doyen (Mathisen), Tijl Faveyts (Zacharie), Karel Martin Ludvik, (Oberthal). Essener Philharmoniker, Giuliano Carella, conductor. Recorded 2017. Oehms CD Cat:OC971.
- 2023: John Osborn (Jean de Leyde), Elizabeth DeShong (Fidès), Mané Galoyan (Berthe), Valerio Contaldo (Jonas), Guilhem Worms (Mathisen), James Platt (Zacharie), Edwin Crossley-Mercer (Oberthal); Maîtrise des Bouches-du-Rhône, Lyon Opera Chorus, Mediterranean Youth Orchestra, London Symphony Orchestra, Mark Elder, conductor. Recorded live 15 July 2023, Grand Théâtre de Provence, Aix Festival. LSO Live CD Cat: LSO0894.
