= Hugues Cuénod =

Swiss operatic tenor (1902–2010)

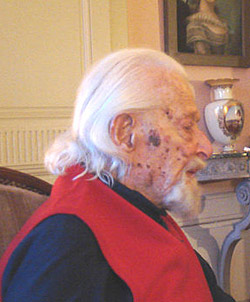
Cuénod on 22 February 2010 at his ancestral home Le Chateau de Lully in Vaud, Switzerland

Hugues-adhémar Cuénod (French pronunciation: [yɡ kɥeˈno]; 26 June 1902 – 6 December 2010) was a Swiss classical tenore di grazia, sometimes placed in the haute-contre category, and music educator known for his performances in international opera, operetta, both traditional and musical theatre, and on the concert stage, in character roles where he was particularly known for his clear, light, romantic and expressive poised interpretation of mélodie (French art song).

A master of diction and technique, his repertoire encompassed everything from the medieval chansons of Guillaume de Machaut, Elizabethan lute songs, the sacred renaissance compositions of Claudio Monteverdi to the operas of Emilio de Cavalieri and Jacques Offenbach to the avant garde works of Igor Stravinsky.

Cuénod contributed to the revival of baroque music, performing compositions by Francois Couperin and Francesco Cavalli and others. A distinguished singer of Johann Sebastian Bach's music, he was particularly praised for his interpretation of the Evangelist in Bach's St Matthew Passion.

He gave his first performance in Paris in 1928, appearing in German musical comedies, theatre, light music and cabarat, however by the late 1930s he gravitated more towards concert and grand opera, he became best known for debuting in Jean Francaix 1937 opera Le viable boiteux and originating the role of Sellem, the Auctioneer in Stravinsky's The Rake's Progress.

Cuénod was perhaps best known as the tenor soliste in Eric Satie's 1975 recording of Socrate, based on the text's of Plato featuring pianist Christian Ivaldi.

He was listed in the Guinness World Records as being the oldest performer to debut at the Metropolitan Opera in New York, when at 84, he played the Emperor Altoum, appearing opposite Plácido Domingo in Puccini's Turandot. He continued to perform in concert until he was 91, and as a tutor into his 90s.

== Early life and career ==
Cuénod was born in Corseaux-sur-Vevey, Switzerland on 26 June 1902. His grandfather, Charles William Cuenod, was the mayor of Corseaux, and he had partial English ancestry through his grandmother, being related to both the Churchill and Spencer families. In 1913, aged 11, Cuénod attended the 78th birthday party of Camille Saint-Saëns, who played piano duets with Ignacy Jan Paderewski. He received his French-German music training at the Ribaupierre Institute in Lausanne, at the conservatories in Geneva and Basel, and in Vienna.

He started his career as a concert recitalist and singer of light music and cabaret.

In 1928, he made his professional stage debut in Paris in the premiere of Ernst Krenek's Jonny spielt auf, and in 1929 he sang for the first time in the United States in Noël Coward's Bitter Sweet. From 1930 to 1933, he was active in Geneva, and then in Paris from 1934 to 1937. During the seasons 1937 to 1939, he made an extensive concert tour of North America.

In Pre-war Vienna and Paris, he frequented aristocratic salons, and worked with Nadia Boulanger, with whom he made set of recordings of madrigals by Claudio Monteverdi in 1937; during 1937 and 1939, he made an extensive tour of North America.

From 1940 to 1946, he taught at the Geneva Conservatory.

In 1943 he resumed his operatic career singing in Johann Strauss II's Die Fledermaus in Geneva, after the war, the new early-music relied on his light unmannered natural sound.

He subsequently sang at Milan's La Scala (1951), the Glyndebourne Festival (from 1954 on) and London's Royal Opera House, Covent Garden (1954, 1956 and 1958).

Cuénod was known for his roles as Basilio in Mozart's The Marriage of Figaro, the Astrologer in Rimsky-Korsakov's The Golden Cockerel, and a role written for him by Stravinsky, Sellem in The Rake's Progress.

On February 4, 1969, Cuénod performed Renaissance music with American lutenist (and later composer) Raymond Lynch at the Smithsonian. In the 1970s he performed a number of recitals in the United States and France (Aix-en-Provence Festival, Radio France) with American lutenist Joel Cohen, recording in Switzerland with Cohen (and Swiss harpsichordist Christiane Jaccottet) an album of lute songs by Elizabethan composer John Dowland.

He holds the record as the oldest person to make a debut at the Metropolitan Opera. He debuted as the Emperor Altoum in Giacomo Puccini's Turandot on 12 March 1987 at the age of 84. He repeated the role the following season for a total of 14 performances. His very last appearance on stage was in 1994, aged 91, when he sang M. Triquet in Tchaikovsky's Eugene Onegin at the Théâtre du Jorat in Mézières. After retiring from the concert circuit, he became an educator of the musical arts in England, with Belgian international soprano Suzanne Danco.

== Personal life ==
Cuénod's native language was French, but he was fluent in English, German and Italian. He resided with his life partner, Alfred Augustin (41 years his junior), in the Vaud region of Switzerland. They lived in the Château de Lully, an 18th-century castle that belonged to his grandfather, who purchased the property in 1899.

He turned 100 in 2002. In June 2007, when Cuénod was 105, he and Augustin entered into a civil union after changes in Swiss law gave same-sex couples many of the legal benefits of marriage.

Cuénod died at his home in Vevey, Switzerland, on 6 December 2010, at the age of 108.

== Awards and honours ==
Cuénod's recording of Erik Satie's Socrate in 1975, released on Nimbus Records, won the Grand Prix du Disque Mondiale award at the Montreux Music Festival. In 1976 he was awarded the Chevalier des Arts et des Lettres.

On his centenary in 2002, he was awarded the World of Song award by the Lotte Lehmann Foundation.

== Sources ==
- Hudry, François (1999). Hugues Cuénod with an Agile Voice: Conversations With François Hudry. Translated by Albert Fuller. Pendragon Press. ISBN 978-1-57647-029-9.
