= Jeanne-Anaïs Castellan =

French soprano

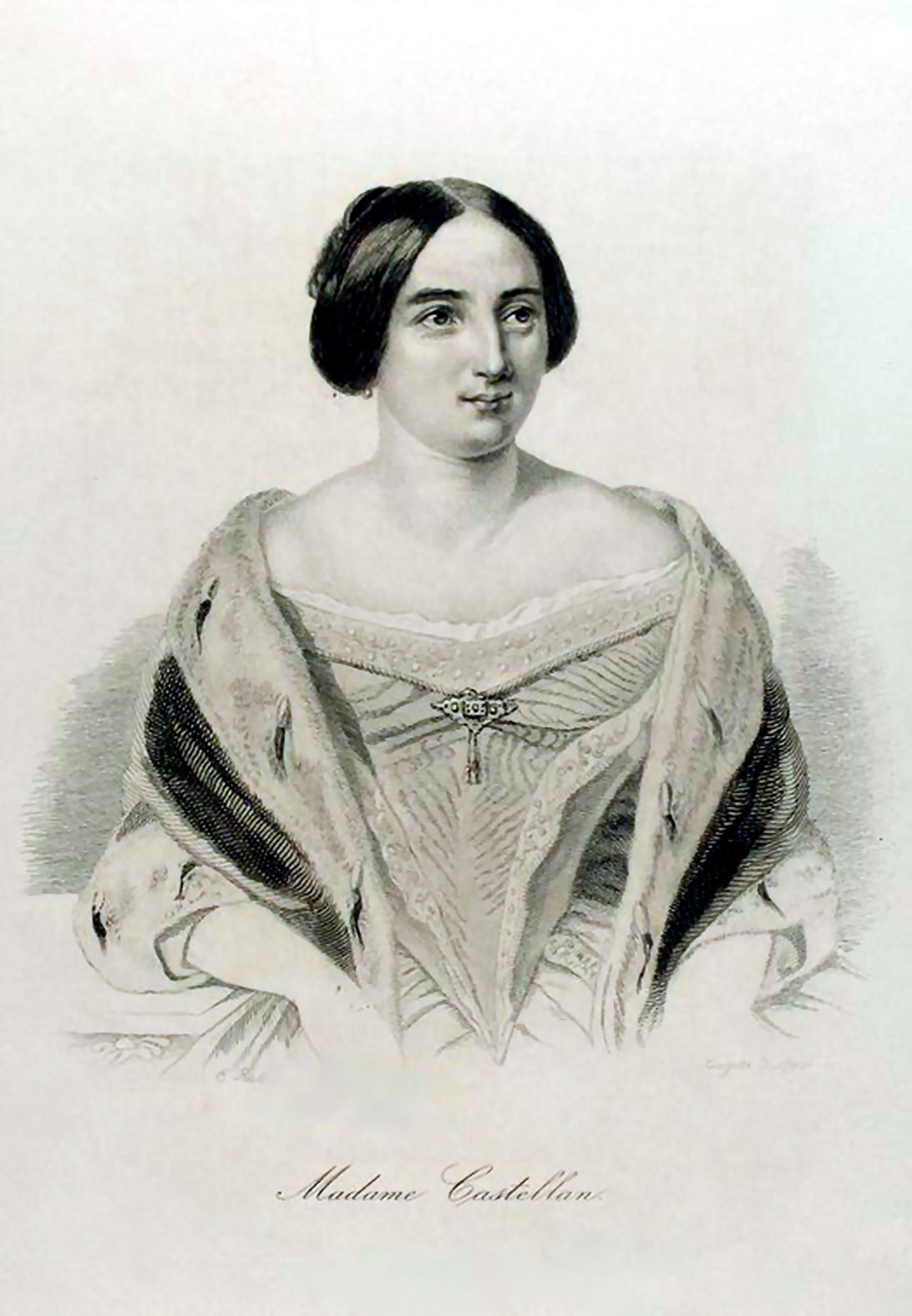

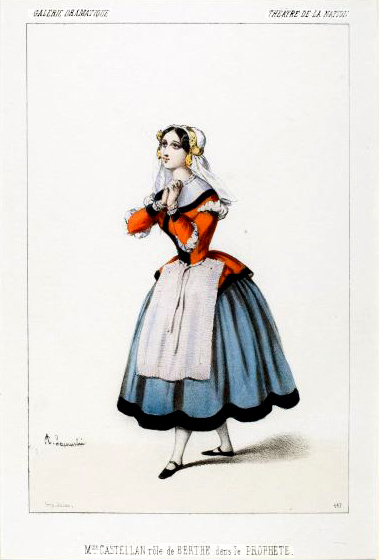
Costume design for Castellan as Berthe in Le prophète in the first production, 1849

Jeanne-Anaïs Castellan (real name Jeanne Anaïs Castel or Chastel), born in Beaujeu, Rhône on 26 October 1819, died after 1858, was a French soprano. She is most notable for creating the part of Berthe in Le prophète by Meyerbeer.

== Training and career ==
Jeanne-Anaïs Castellan entered the Paris Conservatoire aged only twelve and studied there for six years, as a pupil of Laure Cinti-Damoreau and others. Upon completing her studies at the Conservatoire in 1836, she won first prize in singing. She began her career in Italy, singing in Rome, Milan and Florence among other cities, where she met and married the Italian tenor Emilio Giampietro. Castellan enjoyed an international career, singing in Cuba, the United States, England and Russia. In the Italian premiere of Meyerbeer's Robert le diable she sang the role of Isabelle, with Jenny Lind as Alice. This production was attended by the composer, who brought her to Paris to create the leading role of Berthe in his sensationally successful opera Le prophète at the Paris Opera. She had further engagements at the Opera and the Théâtre-Italien and was the soprano soloist in Mozart's Requiem, performed at Chopin's funeral in Paris. She sang frequently in Portugal and England as well as France. Jeanne-Anaïs Castellan apparently retired from the stage in 1858 and lived in retirement until her death three years later.
