= Lotte Lehmann Foundation =

The Lotte Lehmann Foundation, named for the German soprano Lotte Lehmann, was founded in 1999, and served to preserve and perpetuate her legacy, and to honor her dream of bringing art song into the lives of as many people as possible. The organization was founded by Gary Hickling, a musician and expert on Lehmann. Hickling was also the founder of the Lotte Lehmann League.

== Inception and history ==
Founder Gary Hickling had met Lotte Lehmann in the early 1960s when he was a double bass player at university, observing the private voice lessons Lehmann gave at Orplid, her home in Santa Barbara. He later observed her master classes at the Music Academy of the West, which she had helped found in 1947.

Hickling became a noted expert on Lehmann's career and work, compiling a Lehmann discography in 1987. He continued to compile and collect material and memorabilia relating to her career, which now forms a significant part of the Lotte Lehmann Archive in Santa Barbara. The foundation's precursor, the Lotte Lehmann League, published a newsletter from 1989 to 1994; the league was later re-established as a website in 2011.

Hickling founded the Lotte Lehmann Foundation in 1999. In the early years of its existence, he was solely responsible for maintaining it.

Operations of the foundation were transferred from Hawaii, where Hickling lived, to New York City in 2003. The composer Daron Hagen was chosen as the newly configured foundation's president, and an entirely new board of directors was chosen at that time. Mezzo soprano Linn Maxwell was elected president in 2007. Larry Smith was president beginning in 2010. Hickling retired from the foundation in 2005 and became an emeritus member of the Board of Directors.

As of 2016, the foundation is in hiatus. Since 1988, Hickling has hosted a weekly program on art songs on Hawaii Public Radio, initially titled Great Songs, and from 2011 titled Singing and Other Sins. Information and listenable archives of the program are hosted on the Lotte Lehmann League website.

== Activities ==
The Lehmann Foundation was a respected non-profit musical foundation in the United States. Its activities included two competitions, the first of which, the internet-based CyberSing vocal competition occurred every two years and solicited recordings from singers the world over. Entrants submitted recordings of appropriate literature, including a song written expressly for the competition by a distinguished composer. These songs were commissioned from composers such as Ned Rorem, Libby Larsen and Dan Welcher. Winners were chosen solely on the basis of their recorded submissions. Laureates of the 2006 competition included sopranos Debra Stanley and Danielle Talamantes and baritone Andrew Garland.

The ASCAP/Lotte Lehmann Foundation Song Cycle Competition, which occurred in alternating years with CyberSing, solicited compositions by young composers resident in or native of the United States; winners received commissions to compose individual songs or, in the case of the first prize recipient, a song cycle. Winners of the 2005 competition included Scott Gendel and Mark Buntag. Gendel's prize-winning commission, The Space Between, was published by E. C. Schirmer and premiered by soprano Martha Guth and pianist Bradley Moore on 24 February 2007 at the Bruno Walter Auditorium in New York under the auspices of the Joy in Singing Foundation.

VoxNova Media was another aspect of the foundation's activities. The mission of this division was to produce media in a variety of forms, including audio recordings, video recordings, printed materials. VNM plan was to reissue historical audio recordings by Lehmann and her colleagues, present new recordings of contemporary vocal repertoire and of the vocal art of contemporary interpreters.

In addition to these programs and activities, the foundation presented an annual World of Song Award which alternated among composers, singers, and collaborative pianists and served to recognize those who have devoted their creative lives to this enriching form of music. Recipients include pianist and educator John Wustman, composers Dominick Argento and Ned Rorem, pianists Dalton Baldwin and Graham Johnson, tenor Hugues Cuénod, mezzo soprano Janet Baker, and baritone Dietrich Fischer-Dieskau. The foundation also published SongScape, a biannual newsletter edited by board member Craig Urquhart and featuring news of the foundation's activities.
