= Marianne Cornetti =

American operatic mezzo-soprano

- Born: 1962 (age 63–64)
- Occupation: Operatic mezzo-soprano
- Years active: 1990–present
- Title: Artistic Director of Pittsburgh Festival Opera (since 2019)
- Website: www.mariannecornetti.com

Marianne Cornetti (born 1962) is an American opera singer, known for her rendition of mezzo-soprano roles in operas by Giuseppe Verdi, such as Azucena in Il trovatore, Amneris in Aida, and Eboli in Don Carlo.

== Early life ==
Cornetti grew up in Cabot, Butler County, Pennsylvania, a town north of Pittsburgh, to Irish mother and Italian father. Four generations of women in her maternal family had high musical abilities though none of them were formally trained. Although raised Catholic and practicing, she sang in the choir of St. Mary of the Assumption Catholic Church in Herman alongside local churches of other denominations.

Her talent was discovered in her sixth grade, when a chorus teacher invited her to sing a solo. She sang "I'd Like to Teach the World to Sing" and was then recommended to the high school choir director. Since eighth grade, she had four years of private voice lessons before attending college. After graduating from Knoch High School in 1981, she was enrolled into the Manhattan School of Music but she later transferred due to poor experience. She then attended College-Conservatory of Music in Cincinnati. In her sophomore year, a thyroid problem forced her to suspend her studies. After a year's treatment she lost self-confidence and gave up returning in her midway to school.

Considering her strengths in music and human services, she switched major into speech pathology and attended Penn State University. Disliking the academic subjects, she transferred one year later to Duquesne University in Pittsburgh, which was reputed in her field of studies. An administrator there suggested that she could do double major and finish the music degree considering her credits, but she in fact had to choose one. After two months, having regained the passion in singing, she admitted her perplexity to her voice teacher Mija Novich, a dramatic soprano, who in turn told her, "If you don't sing, it will haunt you for the rest of your life." She had committed to music ever since. She is an alumna of the Ezio Pinza Council for American Singers of Opera (EPCASO).

== Career ==
After her studies, Cornetti spent three years in the Young Artists Program of Pittsburgh Opera, where she made her first stage appearance as First maid in Strauss' Elektra in 1989. She was then engaged in small roles elsewhere in the United States, notably the Wolf Trap Opera Company. She made her Metropolitan Opera debut at the end of 1993, as the Russian Nanny in Death in Venice. In New York, she had private studies with Dodi Protero, with whom she worked on the bigger roles for about ten years.

She sang her first major role in 1995 at the Atlanta Opera, where she was originally going to sing Fenena in Nabucco but switched instead to Azucena in Il trovatore. After the performance, she was engaged by Hawaii Opera Theatre to sing Amneris in Aida in 1997, which led to further recognition in major roles. She finally left the Met in 1998 after five years of exclusively small roles, the last being Mamma Lucia in Cavalleria rusticana.

Cornetti has since performed at leading venues, such as the Verona Arena, La Scala, Vienna State Opera, La Monnaie, Bavarian State Opera. She returned to the Metropolitan Opera in 2002, where she has since sang roles including Amneris, Azucena, Ulrica in Un ballo in maschera, and Abigaille in Nabucco.

In 2002, she sang the Princess de Bouillon in Adriana Lecouvreur for the first time at the Teatro dell'Opera di Roma, alongside Nelly Miricioiu in the title role.

Cornetti was appointed Artistic Director of Pittsburgh Festival Opera in November 2019. She is also on the Voice Faculty at Carnegie Mellon University.

== Personal life ==
Cornetti lives in Pittsburgh. She formerly resided in New Kensington for nine years.

== Awards and honors ==
Cornetti was a recipient of Carlow University's 2016 Women of Spirit Awards.
