= Pittsburgh Festival Opera =

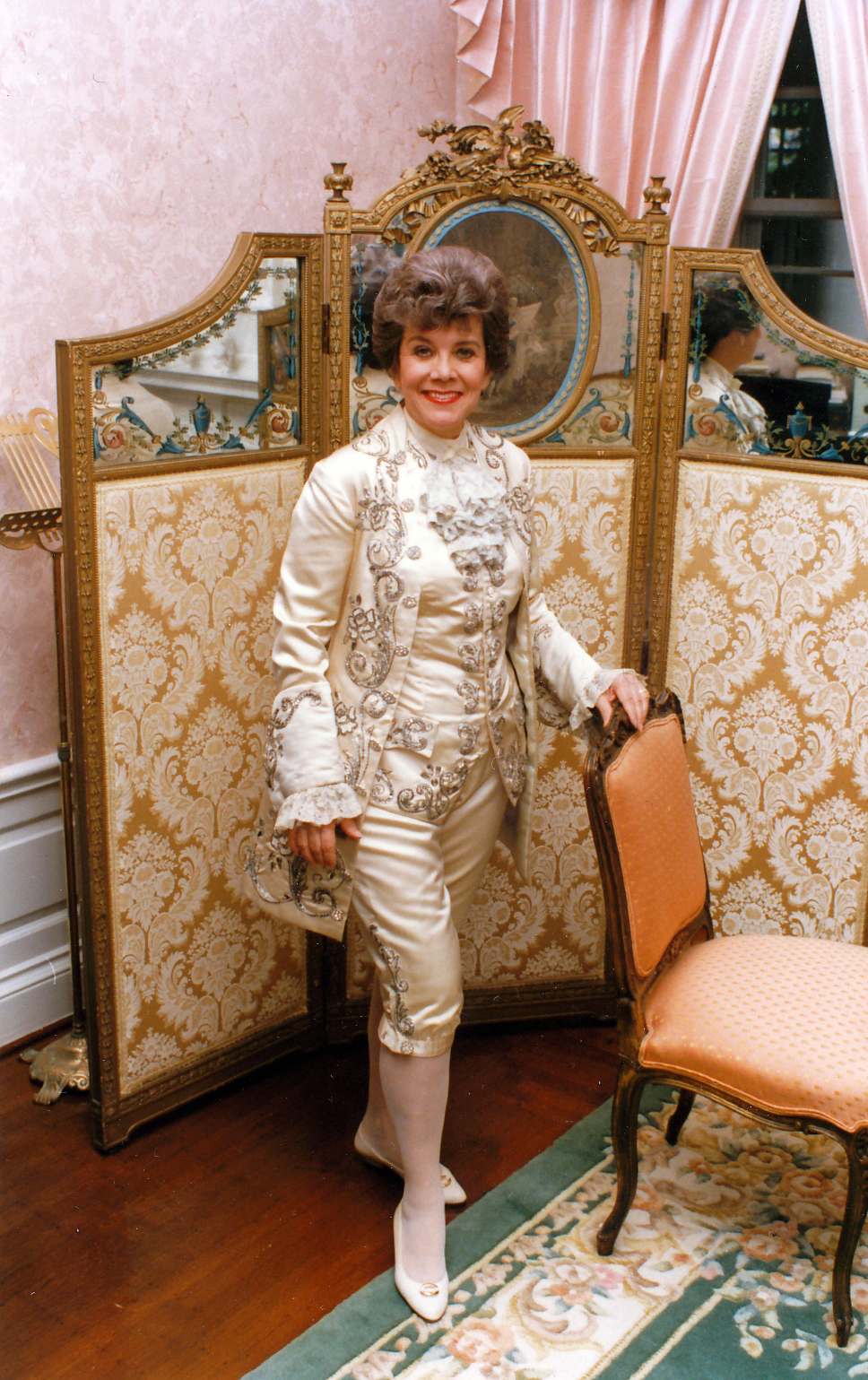
Mildred Miller Posvar, founder

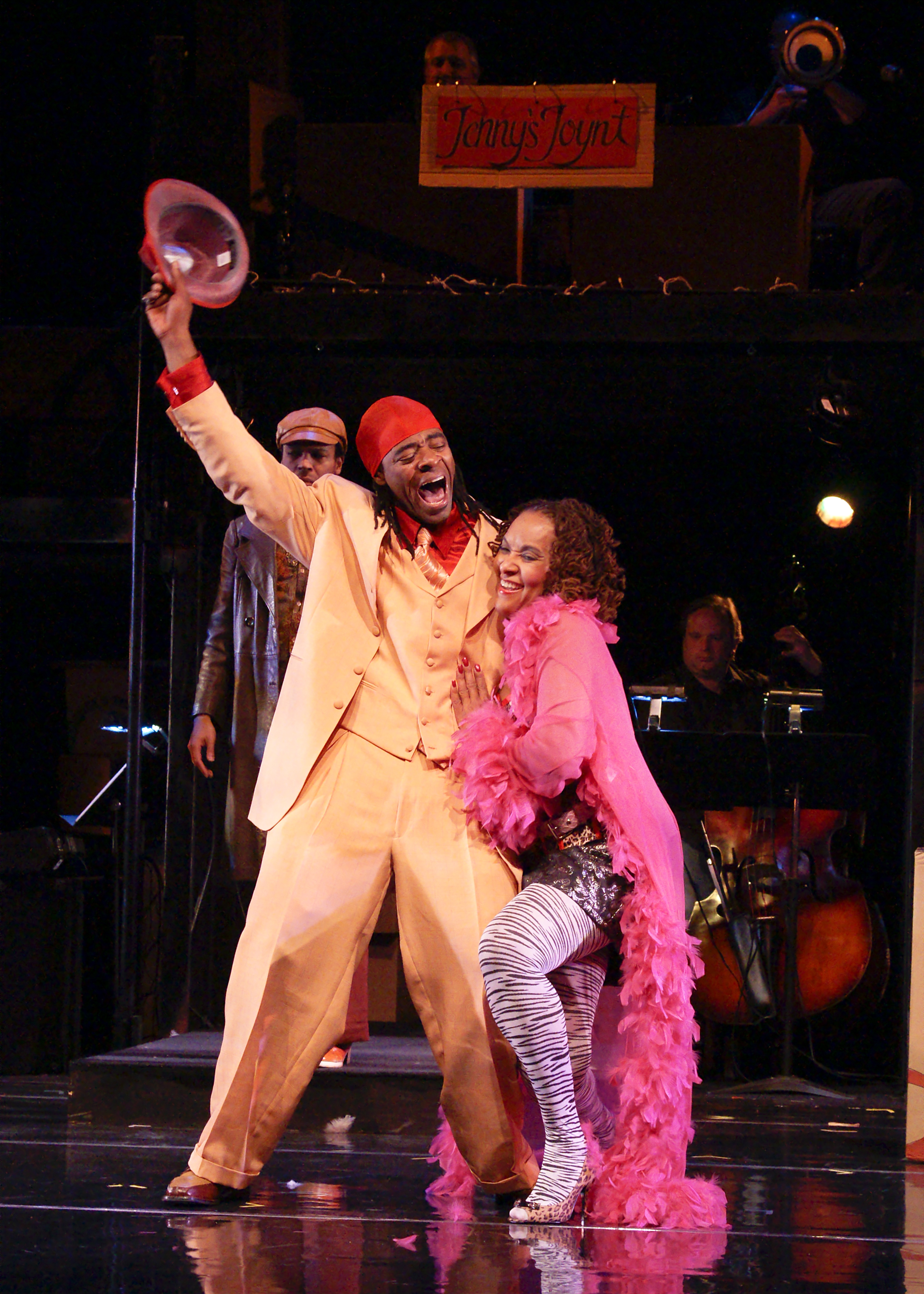
Beggar's Holiday

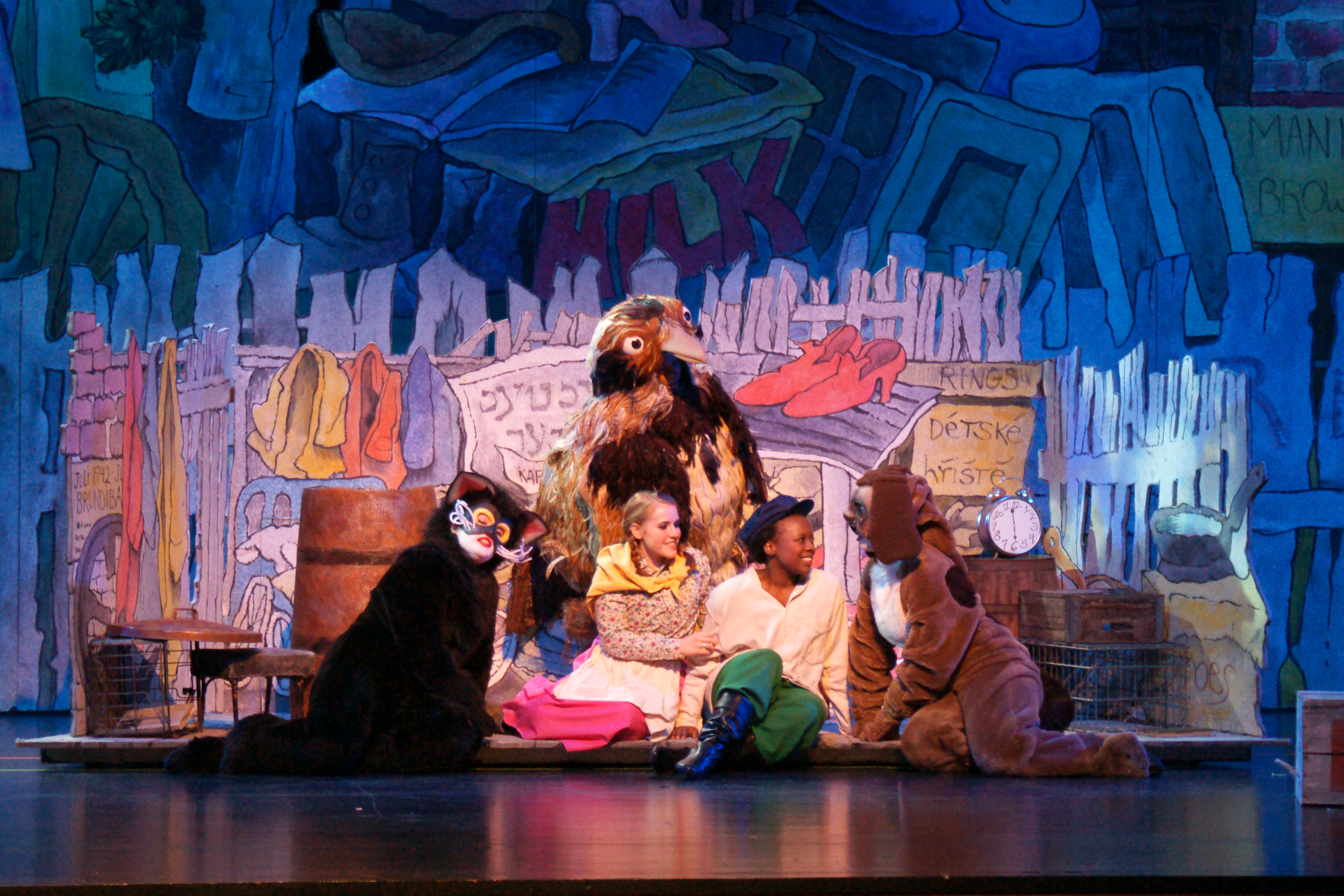
Brundibar

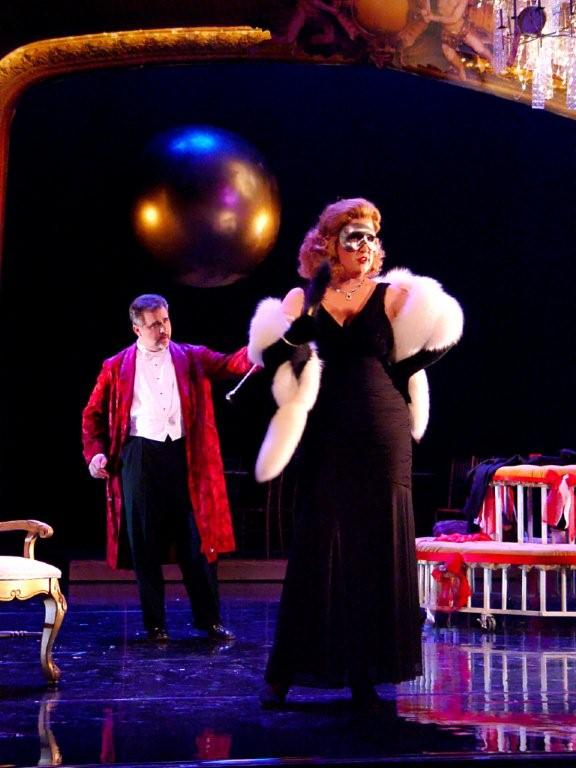
Die Fledermaus

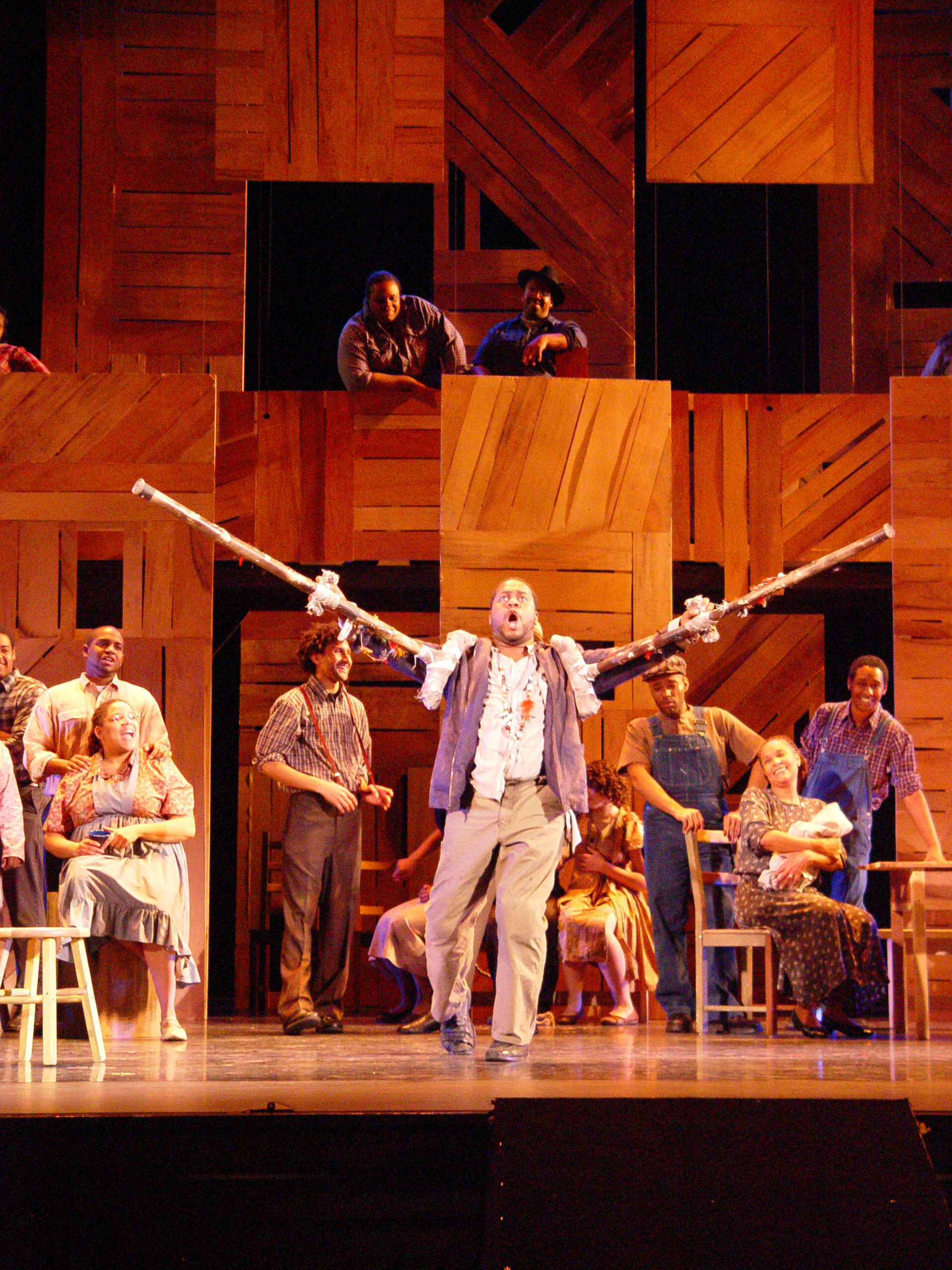
Porgy & Bess

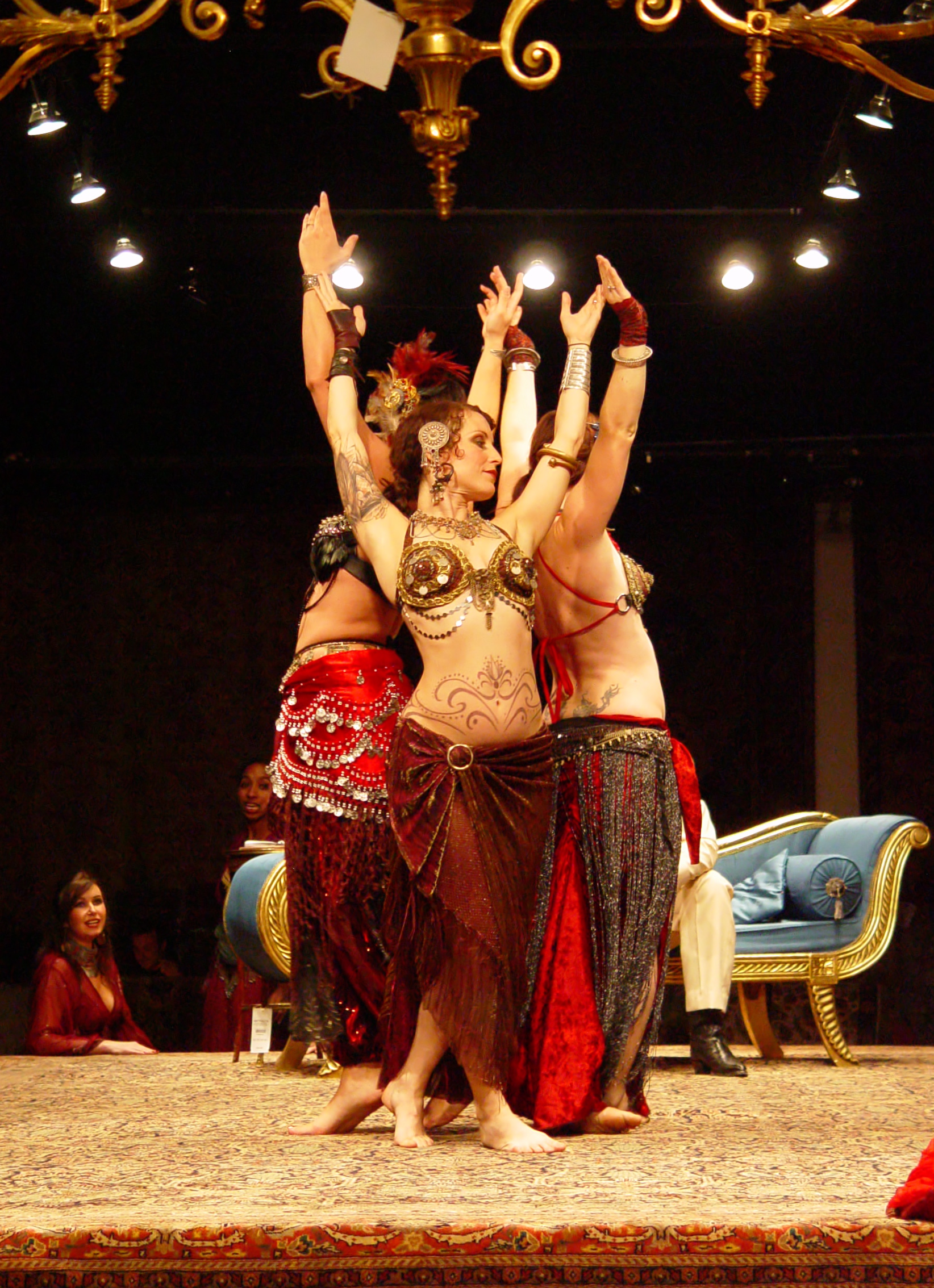
Djamileh

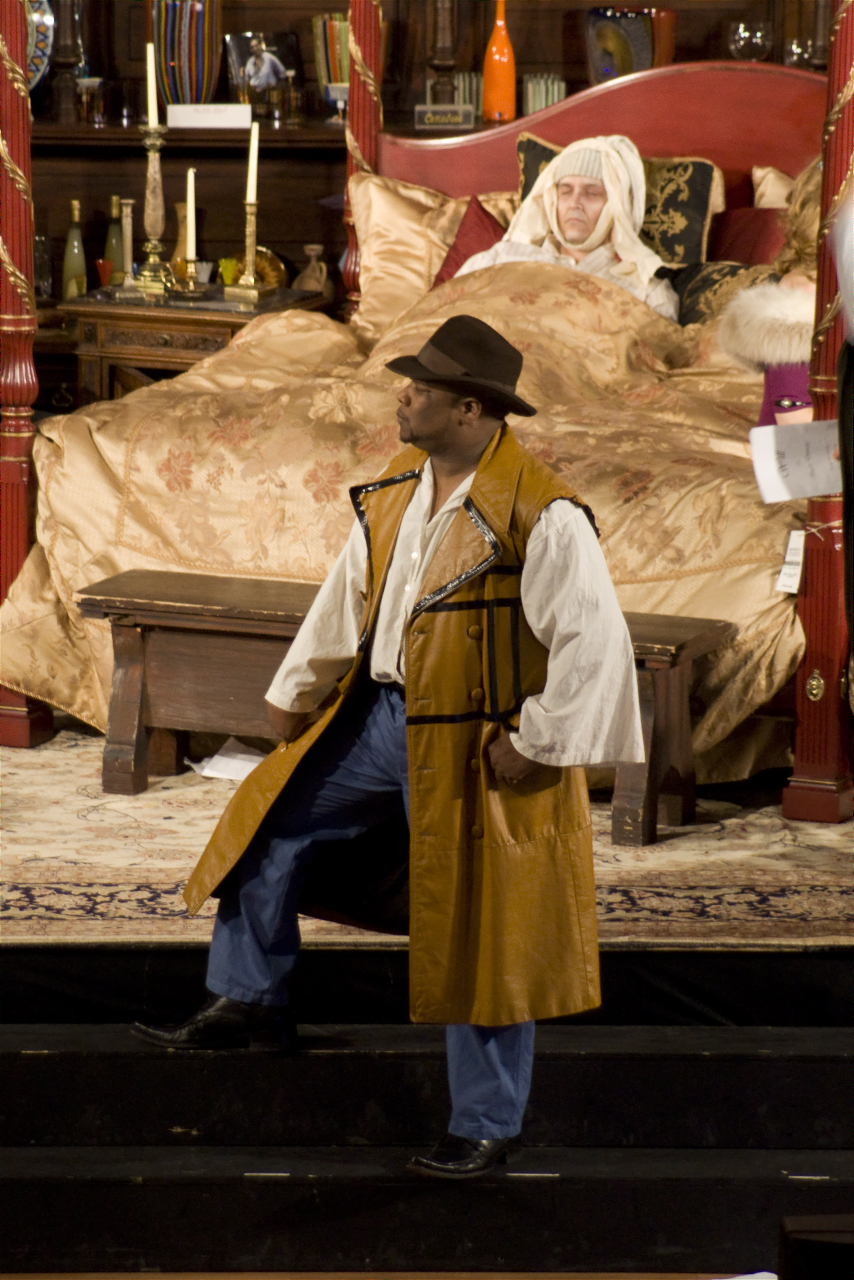
Gianni Schicchi

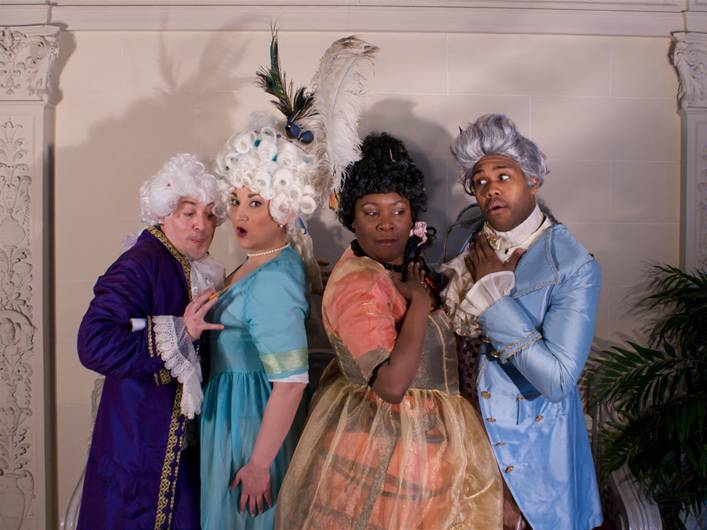
Prima La Musica

Pittsburgh Festival Opera (PFO), formerly Opera Theater of Pittsburgh, is a professional American opera company based in Pittsburgh's university and museum district. Pittsburgh Festival Opera performs at non-traditional venues around the city.

Pittsburgh Festival Opera was established in 1978 by the noted opera star Mildred Miller Posvar and Helen Knox. In 2012, Pittsburgh Festival Opera reinvented itself as a summer festival presenting staged operas, musicals, recitals, and cabaret.

PFO is currently under the leadership of Managing Director Roxy MtJoy and Artistic Director Marianne Cornetti.

== Activities ==
Artistic initiatives have included a Music that Matters series, exploring new work that tells socially relevant stories, a Fusion Festival of American-Asian works at the Andy Warhol Museum which included the world premiere of RedDust, a multi-media opera by Mathew Rosenblum and The Sound of a Voice by Philip Glass and David Henry Hwang. Other projects have included the Pittsburgh Ring, two complete cycles of Wagner's great operas in collaboration with Long Beach Opera using Jonathan Dove's orchestral reduction. Recent American operas include A Gathering of Sons, Just Above My Head, a world premiere jazz opera by Pittsburgher Nathan Davis. Operatic versions of classics American plays have included Lee Hoiby's Summer and Smoke, William Bolcom's A View From the Bridge and Regina, an operatic version of The Little Foxes by Marc Blitzstein. In 2020, Pittsburgh Festival Opera premieres Virgula Divina by Karen Brown and Jessica Lanay.

Aside from forays in the traditional repertory, PFO has sought to present a number of modern masterpieces which are not regularly included on standard programs: Lost in the Stars, The Emperor of Atlantis, Bluebeard's Castle, Brundibar, Der Jasager, and the English language premiere of Weill's Die Bürgschaft.

Past productions also include a "Salon Series" devoted to shorter works performed in unusual spaces, such as Puccini's Gianni Schicchi, performed in a church converted into an art gallery; Bizet's Djamileh, presented in a Persian Carpet Emporium; Thomas Pasatieri's La Divina, and Salieri's Prima la Musica, e Poi le Parole, performed in Pittsburgh's own version of the Petit Trianon Palace.

== The Mildred Miller International Voice Competition ==
Pittsburgh Festival Opera annually hosts the Mildred Miller International Voice Competition in honor of its founder, Mildred Miller Posvar. The event, held in Pittsburgh, is a search for America's best singers. Young professionals aged 18–35 are eligible to compete for cash prizes and solo roles in the company's summer Festival. Past competition winners include Juan José de Leon, Andrey Nemzer, Meghan Kasanders, Alasdair Kent, Karen Chia-ling Ho, and Elizabeth Baldwin.

PFO previously celebrated annually The Millie Awards. The purpose was to reflect several diverse aspects of Mildred Miller's distinguished career - singing, acting, community service and education. The "Millies", as they are affectionately called, recognize and show appreciation for high accomplishments in the performing arts, honoring those individuals whose support has been instrumental in the success of Pittsburgh Festival Opera.

== Community Engagement and Education ==
Pittsburgh Festival Opera's engagement with its community is of primary importance. Working directly with schools as well as in partnership with fellow non-profit organizations, PFO has taken opera to more than 500,000 school children in its 42-year history. In addition, it actively seeks opportunities to include students in productions, exceeding state standards for direct arts experiences and creating partnerships with the communities and the families for which it performs.

== Record of Repertory ==
Festival 2018 - July 6–July 22, 2018

- La Bohème Warhola by Giacomo Puccini
- Arabella by Richard Strauss
- Rhinegold by Richard Wagner
- Goldie B. Locks and the Three Singing Bears by John Davies/Wolfgang A. Mozart

Festival 2017 - June 15–July 23, 2017

- A Gathering of Sons (World Premiere) by Dwayne Fulton
- Intermezzo by Richard Strauss
- Xerxes (opera) by George F. Handel
- Sweeney Todd by Stephen Sondheim
- Hansel and Gretel by Engelbert Humperdinck

Festival 2016 - July 7–24, 2016

- Carmen the Gypsy by Georges Bizet
- The Silent Woman by Richard Strauss
- Julius Caesar (opera) by George F. Handel
- Kiss Me, Kate by Cole Porter
- Little Red Riding Hood by Seymour Barab

Festival 2015 - July 10–August 2, 2015

- The Marriage of Figaro by Wolfgang Amadeus Mozart
- Capriccio by Richard Strauss
- A New Kind of Fallout by Gilda Lyons
- Damn Yankees by Richard Adler and Jerry Ross
- The True Story of the Three Little Pigs by Wallace DePue

Festival 2014 - July 10–27, 2014

- Marianne Cornetti in Concert
- The Merry Widow by Franz Lehár
- The Fantasticks by Tom Jones & Harvey Schmidt
- Ariadne on Naxos by Richard Strauss
- The Jumping Frog of Calaveras County by Lukas Foss
- Happy Hour! by Roger Zahab

Festival 2013 - July 6–21, 2013

- The Tales of Hoffmann - Retold by Jacques Offenbach
- A Little Night Music by Stephen Sondheim
- Shining Brow by Daron Hagen
- La finta giardiniera by Wolfgang Amadeus Mozart
- Night Caps International by various composers

Festival 2012

- The Magic Flute by Wolfgang Amadeus Mozart, English translation by Jeremy Sams - June 29, July 1, 8, 14, 2012
- Carmen -The Gypsy by Georges Bizet, English translation by Sheldon Harnick, musical adaption by Jonathan Eaton and Robert Frankenberry - June 30, July 6, 12, 14, 2012
- Candide by Leonard Bernstein - July 7, 13, 15, 2012
- Night Caps libretto by Rob Handel, music by Alberto Garcia Demestres, Robert Frankenberry, Dwayne Fulton, Daron Aric Hagen, Gilda Lyons, Eric Moe, Roger Zahab - July 6–8, 12–15, 2012

2010-2011

- Euridice and Orpheus by Ricky Ian Gordon - June 9–11, 2011
- The Gospel at Colonus by Bob Telson - March 25–27, 2011
- Orpheus ed Euridice by Christoph Gluck - November 5–7, 2010

2009-2010

- Beautiful Dreamers by Martin Giles - April 15-May 1, 2010
- Love Spell (L'incantesimo) by Italo Montemezzi - February 12–14, 2010
- Beggar's Holiday by Dale Wasserman - December 18–20, 2009
- Brundibar music by Hans Krasa, designed by Maurice Sendak - November 6–8, 2009

2008-2009

- Gianni Schicchi by Giacomo Puccini - April 24–25, 2009
- Prima la Musica, e Poi le Parole by Antonio Salieri - March 24–25, 2009
- Porgy and Bess by George Gershwin - February 14–15, 2009
- Die Fledermaus by Johann Strauss - December 27–28, 2008
- La Divina by Thomas Pasatieri - November 2, 2008
- Djamileh by Georges Bizet - October 3–4, 2008

2007-2008

- Lost in the Stars by Kurt Weill - February 12–14, 2008
- Die Fledermaus by Johann Strauss, December 27–30, 2007
- The Impresario by Wolfgang Amadeus Mozart, November 11, 2007
- The Marriage of Figaro by Wolfgang Amadeus Mozart - September 25, 28–30, 2007

2006-2007

- Fusion Festival - The Sound of a Voice by Philip Glass and Red Dust by Mathew Rosenblum - April 26–29, 2007
- Die Zauberflöte by Wolfgang Amadeus Mozart- collaboration with Pittsburgh Opera - March 24, 27, 30, and April 1, 2007
- Carmen Jones by Georges Bizet and lyrics by Oscar Hammerstein - November 17–18, 2006
- Amahl and the Night Visitors by Gian Carlo Menotti - December 14–17, 2006

2005-2006

- The Ring Cycle (Rhinegold, The Valkyrie, Siegfried, Twilight of the Gods) by Richard Wagner - July 14–16 and 21–23, 2006
- Noye's Fludde by Benjamin Britten and The Jackleg Testament by Jay Bolotin - March 2–5, 2006
- Amahl and the Night Visitors by Gian Carlo Menotti - December 14–18, 2005

2004-2005

- The Ring Cycle (Rhinegold and The Valkyrie) by Richard Wagner with the Pittsburgh Symphony Orchestra - July 15–17, 2005
- Amahl and the Night Visitors by Gian Carlo Menotti - December 8–12, 2004
- The Soldier's Tale by Igor Stravinsky with the Pittsburgh Symphony Orchestra- November 5–7, 2004 with Pittsburgh Symphony
- A View from the Bridge by William Bolcom, based on the play by Arthur Miller - September 16–26, 2004

2003-2004

- Summer and Smoke by Lee Hoiby, based on a play by Tennessee Williams - September 26 - October 5, 2003
- Talking with Tennessee devised and directed by Jonathan Eaton - September 25 - October 5, 2003
- Amahl and the Night Visitors by Gian Carlo Menotti - December 7–13, 2003
- Jazzopera: Just Above My Head by Nathan Davis, based on the novel Just Above My Head by James Baldwin – June 9–13, 2004

2002-2003

- 25th Anniversary Celebration, Gala Concert of American Opera - April 27, 2003
- Amahl and the Night Visitors by Gian Carlo Menotti- December 12–15, 2002
- The Magic Flute by Wolfgang Amadeus Mozart - November 22–23, 2002

2001-2002

- Bluebeard's Castle by Béla Bartók - April 26 & 28, 2002
- The Emperor of Atlantis by Viktor Ullman - April 6–7, 2002
- Brundibar by Hans Krása - March 7, 2002
- Amahl and the Night Visitors by Gian Carlo Menotti - December 13–16, 2001

2000-2001

- Madrigals of Love and War by Claudio Monteverdi - November 4–5, 2000
- Hansel and Gretel by Engelbert Humperdinck
- Amahl and Night Visitors by Gian Carlo Menotti - December 14–17, 2000
- The Cunning Vixen by Leon Janáček
- Limbus - a mechanical opera by Jay Bolotin - March 27–31, 2001

1999-2000

- Die Bürgschaft (The Bond) by Kurt Weill - May 25–28, 2000
- Songplay by Kurt Weill/Jonathan Eaton - April 26 - May 7, 2000
- Weill We're At It by Kurt Weill - collaboration with River City Brass - April 22, 2000
- Nogaku-za in Taniko (The Valley Rite) attributed Komparu Zenchiku - April 10, 2000
- Der Jasager (The Consenter) by Kurt Weill - April 10, 2000

1998-1999

- Susannah by Carlisle Floyd - March 27 & 29, 1998
- Candide by Leonard Bernstein - April 16 & 18, 1999

1997-1998

- The Magic Flute by Wolfgang Amadeus Mozart – April, 1997

1996-1997

- The Marriage of Figaro by Wolfgang Amadeus Mozart - April 16, 1997
- The Ballad of Baby Doe by Douglas Moore

1995-1996

- The Bartered Bride by Bedřich Smetana - March 28 & 30, 1996

1994-1995

- La Cendrillon by Jules Massenet - May 18 & 20, 1995
- Madama Butterfly by Giacomo Puccini - March 22 & 25, 1995

1993-1994

- Julius Caesar in Egypt by George Frideric Handel - March 3 & 5, 1994

1992-1993

- Il barbiere di Siviglia by Gioachino Rossini - April 15, 1993

1991-1992

- The Crucible by Robert Ward - November 23, 1991

1990-1991

- The Consul by Gian Carlo Menotti - May 19, 1991
- The Abduction from the Seraglio by Wolfgang Amadeus Mozart - January 20, 1991
- The Tender Land by Aaron Copland - November 1990

1989-1990

- Orpheus and Euridice by Christoph Willibald Gluck - May 1 & 3, 1990
- Regina by Marc Blitzstein - January 18, 1990
- Così fan tutte by Wolfgang Amadeus Mozart - November 19, 1989
- The Marriage of Figaro by Wolfgang Amadeus Mozart - April 3, 1989

1988-1989

- The Triumph of Honor by Alessandro Scarlatti - January 22, 1989
- Carmen by Georges Bizet - Summer 1989
- Tartuffe by Kirke Meacham - November 20 & 22, 1998

1988

- The Marriage of Figaro by Wolfgang Amadeus Mozart, August 27, 1988 at Hartwood Acres
- Carmen by Georges Bizet

1987

- Hansel and Gretel by Engelbert Humperdinck, May 2, 1987

1986

- La Bohème by Giacomo Puccini

1985

- Hansel and Gretel by Engelbert Humperdinck
- Madama Butterfly by Giacomo Puccini

1984

- The Brute by Lawrence Moss and A Full Moon in March by John Harbison - May 24, 1984

1982

- The Marriage of Figaro by Wolfgang Amadeus Mozart
- Hansel and Gretel by Engelbert Humperdinck, November 29, 1982 with Pittsburgh Symphony
- The Music Master by Giovanni Pergolesi, and Combatimento di Tancredi e Clorinda by Monteverdi, July 12, 1982

1981

- The Barber of Seville by Gioachino Rossini, November 14, 1981 with the Greenville Symphony (Touring Production)

1979

- La Cenerentola by Gioachino Rossini (dress rehearsal), June 1978

1978

- The Telephone by Gian Carlo Menotti and La serva padrona by Giovanni Pergolesi
