= Mildred Miller =

American classical mezzo-soprano (1924–2023)

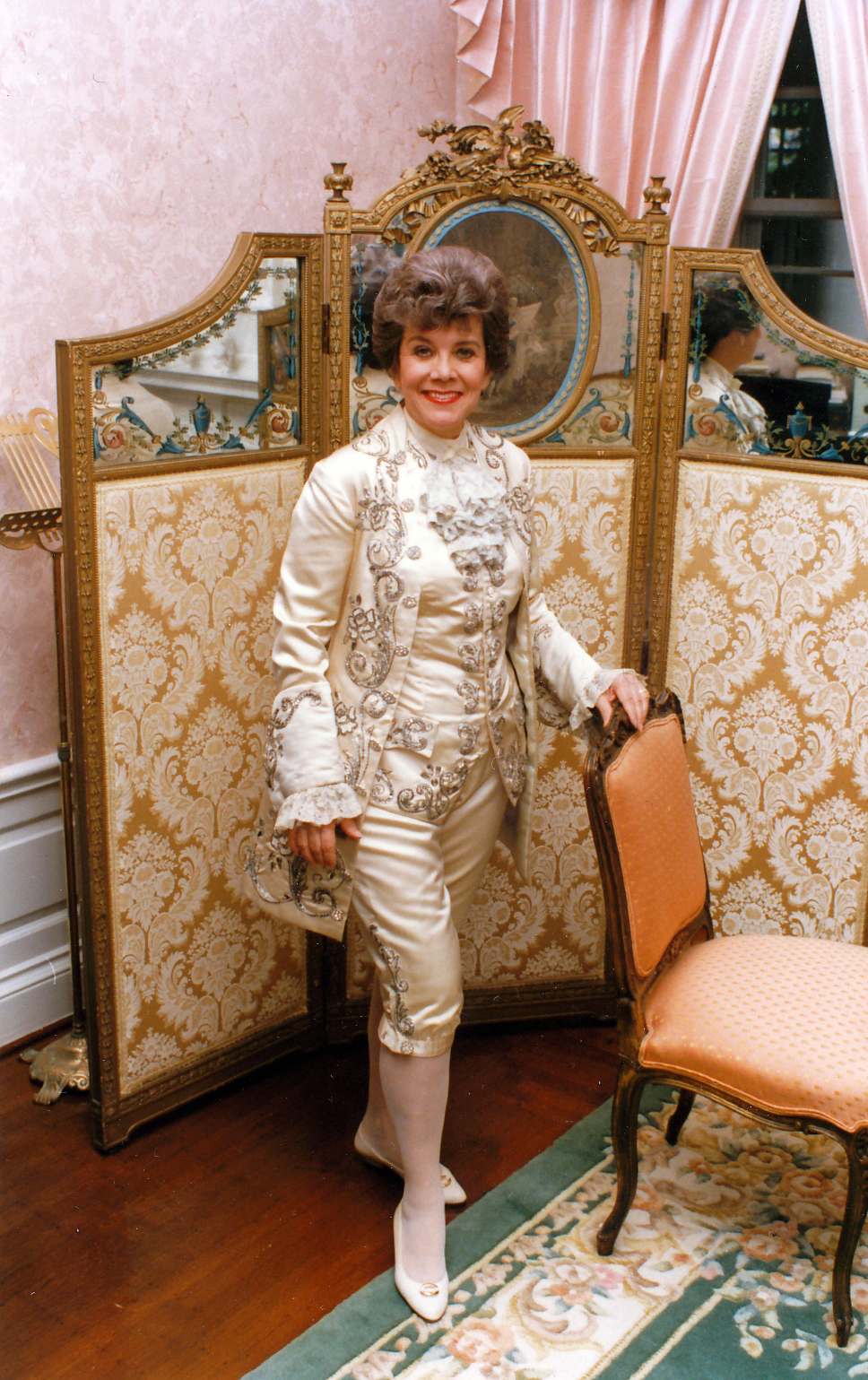
Miller as Octavian in Der Rosenkavalier

Mildred Miller Posvar (December 16, 1924 – November 29, 2023) was an American classical mezzo-soprano who had a major career performing in operas, concerts, and recitals during the mid twentieth century. She was notably a principal artist at the Metropolitan Opera from 1951 through 1974. In 1978 she founded the Opera Theater of Pittsburgh, serving as the company's Artistic Director through 1999.

As a performer, Miller won particular acclaim for her singing of German Lieder and recorded with, among others, conductor Bruno Walter, with whom she won a Grand Prix du Disque for Gustav Mahler's Lieder eines fahrenden Gesellen. On the opera stage she became known for her portrayal of pants roles (in particular the role of Cherubino in The Marriage of Figaro), garnering the nickname "Legs Miller". She is a Gold Medal recipient from the American Academy of Arts and Letters, and held honorary degrees from the Cleveland Institute of Music, the New England Conservatory, Bowling Green State University, and Washington & Jefferson College.

== Early life and career ==
Miller was born Mildred Müller in Cleveland, Ohio, the daughter of Elsa and Wilhem Müller, who were emigrants from Stuttgart, Germany. She attended the Cleveland Metropolitan School District and graduated from West High School in 1942. She entered the Cleveland Institute of Music (CIM) where she was a voice student of Marie Simmelink Kraft.

After graduating in 1946 from the CIM, Miller entered the New England Conservatory (NEC) where she was a pupil of Marie Sundelius. While a student there she spent two summers studying opera under Boris Goldovsky at the Tanglewood Music Center. In 1946 she made her opera debut as one of the nieces in the United States premiere of Benjamin Britten's Peter Grimes at the Tanglewood Music Festival; a production which was conducted by Leonard Bernstein. She went on to perform with Goldovsky's New England Opera Theater in 1947–1948, performing in productions of Carmen and Idomeneo.

After earning an Artist Diploma from the NEC in 1948, Miller studied opera in Italy for several months through the Frank Huntington Beebe Fellowship granted to her by the NEC. In 1949 she moved to her parents' native city to join the roster of singers at the Staatsoper Stuttgart where she was committed for two years. During that time she made many important debuts, including performances at the Bavarian State Opera, the Vienna State Opera, and the Edinburgh Festival. In 1951 she appeared at the Glyndebourne Festival as Preziosilla in Giuseppe Verdi's La forza del destino. In 1950 she married Wesley Posvar, a U.S. Air Force officer and World War II test pilot who was studying in Europe on a Rhodes Scholarship. The couple had previously met in High School in Cleveland but had lost touch with one another before reconnecting in Boston in 1949.

== Working at the Met ==
While performing in Germany, Miller drew the attention of Rudolf Bing, then General Manager of the Metropolitan Opera. He offered her a contract with the company which she initially rejected as she felt the roles she was being offered were too small. However, he returned later with a better offer and Miller made her debut at the Met on November 17, 1951, as Cherubino in Wolfgang Amadeus Mozart's The Marriage of Figaro with Cesare Siepi in the title role, Nadine Conner as Susanna, John Brownlee as Count Almaviva, Victoria de los Angeles as Countess Almaviva, and Fritz Reiner conducting. This was notably the first performance that the mezzo-soprano used the name "Mildred Miller", as Bing had suggested that a different name would counter any potential anti-German sentiment arising, after the World War, which might be stimulated by the German name "Müller".

Miller remained committed to the Met for the next 23 years. Among the many roles she portrayed at the house were Annina and Octavian in Der Rosenkavalier, the Composer in Ariadne auf Naxos, Dorabella in Così fan tutte, Feodor in Boris Godunov, Magdalene in Die Meistersinger von Nürnberg, Meg Page in Falstaff, Nicklausse in The Tales of Hoffmann, the Page in Salome, Preziosilla, Prince Orlofsky in Die Fledermaus, Rosette in Manon, Rosina in The Barber of Seville, the Second Lady in The Magic Flute, the Second Esquire in Parsifal, Siebel in Faust, Suzuki in Madama Butterfly, and the title role in Carmen. Her final and 338th performance at the Met was on December 3, 1974, as Lola in Cavalleria rusticana with Elinor Ross as Santuzza, Harry Theyard as Turiddu, and John Nelson conducting.

== Other career opportunities ==
While performing at the Met, Miller also appeared as a guest artist on the stages of many opera houses throughout the world. She was a frequent performer at the Opern- und Schauspielhaus Frankfurt from 1959 to 1973. She also made appearances at the San Francisco Opera, Lyric Opera of Chicago, Cincinnati Opera, San Antonio Grand Opera Festival, Pittsburgh Opera, Kansas City Opera, Fort Worth Opera, and Opera Pasadena. She was a busy recitalist as well, appearing in concerts in such venues as Carnegie Hall and the White House. She also was a regular guest on both the radio and television broadcasts of The Bell Telephone Hour and appeared several times on The Voice of Firestone and The Ed Sullivan Show.

== Life and career in Pittsburgh ==
Miller and her husband moved to Pittsburgh in 1967 when Posvar was appointed President (ultimately Chancellor) of the University of Pittsburgh. The couple served as the first family of the University of Pittsburgh for nearly 25 years and shared an eclectic life of military assignments, world travel, and academic and artistic pursuits. The University of Pittsburgh continues to award an annual music scholarship in Miller's name.

While in Pittsburgh, Miller established herself as a teacher and coach of singing, and as a producer and director of opera programs. In 1978 she established the Opera Theater of Pittsburgh along with Helen Knox and for many years she served as artistic director and a vocal coach for the company. Although she stepped down as director in 1999, she was still involved with the company. She also taught at the Carnegie Mellon School of Music, and gave master classes all over the world. After more than 50 years of marriage, Miller's husband died of a heart attack in 2001. The couple had three children together: Wesley William Posvar, Marina Posvar, and Lisa Posvar Rossi.

Mildred Miller died on November 29, 2023, aged 98 from Parkinson's disease.

== Sources ==
- Biography of Mildred Miller at Lakewood Public Library Online
- Rome News-Tribune, 1965
- Metropolitan Opera Archives
- Flying Without a Safety Net: The 80 Years of Mildred Miller Posvar, Pitt Chronicle, December 13, 2004
- Mildred Miller Posvar Papers (Mildred Miller Posvar Papers, 1939–2008, CTC.2009.01, Curtis Theatre Collection, Special Collections Department, University of Pittsburgh)
