= Sister Carrie (opera) =

- Opera by Robert Livingstone Aldridge
- Librettist: Herschel Garfein
- Based on: Sister Carrie by Theodore Dreiser
- Premiere: 7 October 2016; Marcus Center; Milwaukee

Sister Carrie is an opera by Robert Livingstone Aldridge to a libretto by Herschel Garfein based upon Theodore Dreiser's 1900 novel of the same name about a country girl's pursuit of the American Dream. The opera premiered in Milwaukee by Florentine Opera on October 7, 2016.

== Recording ==
Released on the Naxos American Classics label, the recording features Adriana Zabala as Carrie, Keith Phares as George Hurstwood, Matt Morgan as Charles Drouet, Alisa Suzanne Jordheim as Lola, Stephen Cunningham as Captain; Florentine Opera, Milwaukee Symphony Orchestra conducted by William Boggs.

== Reception ==
Reviewer Mark Thomas Ketterson, writing in Opera News, called the new opera "an important addition to the American operatic canon."
