= Garfein =

Garfein is a surname. Notable people with the surname include:

- Herschel Garfein (born 1958), American composer, librettist, and stage director
- Jack Garfein (1930–2019), Czech film director and producer
- Rebecca Garfein (fl. 1985–2001), American hazzan
