= Jayne West =

American operatic soprano (born 1955)

Jayne West (born April 24, 1955) is an American operatic soprano.

== Life and career ==
Jayne West was born in White Plains, New York on April 24, 1955. She was raised in Framingham, Massachusetts. After graduating with a Bachelor of Music in Vocal Performance and Masters in Music Teaching from Oberlin College, she moved to Boston, where she received her Masters in Music (Opera Performance), magna cum laude from the Boston Conservatory.

West has appeared with the Austin Lyric Opera (Pamina in Die Zauberflöte), Berkshire Opera Company (Donna Elvira in Don Giovanni, and Anne Trulove in The Rake's Progress), Boston Baroque (Acis and Galatea), Boston Landmarks Orchestra (Beethoven's Ninth Symphony), Houston Grand Opera, Nashville Opera, Opera Festival of New Jersey, Opera/Omaha (world premiere of Weisgall's The Gardens of Adonis), Opera Quotannis, and Théâtre Royal de la Monnaie. She was also in the 1985 world-premiere of the Glass/Moran The Juniper Tree.

West also premiered the Mark Morris Dance Group's productions of L'allegro, il penseroso ed il moderato, Dido and Æneas, and Four Saints in Three Acts. The soprano has been heard with the orchestras of Baltimore, Boston, Buffalo, Detroit, Pensacola, Philadelphia, Seattle, Utah and Washington DC; and has sung at the festivals of Bethlehem Bach, Saito Kinen, San Antonio and Tanglewood.

She portrayed Contessa Almaviva in Peter Sellars' production of Le nozze di Figaro, which was seen in Barcelona, Boston, New York, Paris and Vienna. It was made into a film (1989), as well. West also sings in Robert Craft's important recording of The Rake's Progress (with Jon Garrison, 1993). She can be heard in two excerpts from Handel's Hercules (1999), on the recording entitled "Lorraine at Emmanuel," in duet with Lorraine Hunt Lieberson, which was published in 2008, and as a soloist in Craig Smith's recording of Bach's "St John Passion" (with Frank Kelley as the Evangelist, 1999). In 2009, a "live" recording of the premiere of The Juniper Tree was released on Compact Disc.

The soprano also sang cameo roles in two historic recordings, the original version of Cherubini's Médée (as A Lady of Dircé, 1987) and Gluck's Iphigénie en Tauride (as the Second Priestess and the goddess Diane, 1999).

In 2009, West appeared with the Boston Secession in the world-premiere performance of Ruth Lomon's Testimony of Witnesses, a concert-length oratorio based on the poetry and writings of survivors and victims of the Holocaust, under the direction of Jane Ring Frank. Earlier, she had recorded the same composer's "Songs of Remembrance," for CRI.

As of 2023, the soprano lives in Bristol, Rhode Island, and is on the voice faculty at the Longy School of Music and New England Conservatory Prep and Continuing Education Departments.
