= Frank Kelley (tenor) =

American tenor

Frank Kelley is an American tenor who has performed in concert and in opera throughout North America and Europe. He holds music degrees from Florida State University and the University of Cincinnati College-Conservatory of Music. Kelley has appeared with the San Francisco Opera, Brussels Opera (Professor Maginni in Hans Zender's Stephen Climax, 1990), Boston Opera Theater, Boston Lyric Opera, Oper Frankfurt, Opéra de Lyon, Gran Teatre del Liceu (Barcelona), and the New Israeli Opera. The other ensembles he has sung with include Emmanuel Music, Tanglewood Festival, Ravinia Festival, Marlboro Music Festival, Orchestra of St. Luke's, New Jersey Symphony, Dallas Symphony, Dallas Bach Society, Handel and Haydn Society, Cleveland Orchestra, PepsiCo SummerFare Festival, Baldwin-Wallace Conservatory of Music Bach Festival, Next Wave Festival, Boston Symphony Orchestra, Mark Morris Dance Company, and the National Symphony Orchestra.

Kelley has worked with the director Peter Sellars, including Così fan tutte, Le nozze di Figaro (with Jayne West as the Contessa), and Die sieben Todsünden (with Teresa Stratas). Among the conductors the tenor has sung under are Craig Smith, Christopher Hogwood, Seiji Ozawa, Kent Nagano, and Sir Roger Norrington.

His discography includes recordings of Zender's Stephen Climax (1990), Stravinsky's Renard (conducted by Hugh Wolff), Bach's "St John Passion" (as the Evangelist, conducted by Smith, 1999), Ruth Lomon's song-cycle "Songs of Remembrance" (for CRI), the title role of Monteverdi's L'Orfeo (conducted by Daniel Stepner, 2006), Aldridge's Elmer Gantry (as Eddie Fislinger, 2010), and Floyd's Wuthering Heights (as Joseph, 2015).

As of 2009, Mr Kelley is on the Voice Faculty of Boston University. Notable students who have studied with Kelley include Debbie Kavasch and Diamanda Galás.

== Videography ==
- Mozart: Così fan tutte (Smith, Sellars, 1989) Decca
- Mozart: Le nozze di Figaro (Smith, Sellars, 1989) Decca
- Weill: Die sieben Todsünden (Nagano, Sellars, 1993) Kultur
