= An Amateur Laborer =

- First edition
- Author: Theodore Dreiser
- Language: English
- Genre: autobiography
- Publisher: University of Pennsylvania Press
- Publication date: 1983
- Publication place: United States

An Amateur Laborer is an autobiographical book by Theodore Dreiser.

== Overview ==
Although started in 1904, it was only published posthumously in 1983.

The book is an autobiographical account of a three-year struggle with neurasthenia in the aftermath of Sister Carrie 's financial failure. After being constantly turned down for publications while living in Brooklyn, Dreiser finds a job as a manual worker on a railroad. Eventually, his brother Paul Dresser sends him to a health resort, leading to his replenished morale.
