= Lillie Lainoff =

Award-winning disability and children's book author

- Born: 1994/1995; Washington DC
- Education: Yale University (BA); University of East Anglia (MA)
- Writing career
- Language: English
- Genres: Fiction; YA; Non-fiction; Poetry; Historical Fiction
- Subject: Disability
- Notable work: One for All (2022)
- Website: Official Website

Lillie Lainoff (1994/95 – ) is a young adult author, disability rights activist, and the founder of Disabled Kidlit Writers.

== Biography ==
Lainoff began fencing at 9 years old. She was diagnosed with postural orthostatic tachycardia syndrome (POTS) at 14. She later told The Ace Couple podcast that "for me, the two are inextricably linked. I can’t really think about… or I can’t really remember a time when I was fencing when I didn’t have POTS symptoms.".

Lainoff completed a Bachelor of Arts at Yale University and a Master of Arts in creative writing prose fiction at the University of East Anglia.

At Yale, Lainoff was a NCAA Division fencer. She is currently a women’s sabre coach. In 2017, Lainoff was awarded for her fencing career with the inaugural Spirit of the Sport Honor by the United States Fencing Association.

Lainoff began writing about disability and stories centering disabled characters. She sees her writing as a form of activism. Their activism journey began after they published a piece in the Washington Post about their experience with POTS and chronic illness at university. In 2019, Lainoff won the Literary Award in Short Fiction from the Los Angeles Review for her short story "How to Tell That Guy You’ve Been Dating, Your Boyfriend, or Your Friend (Whom You’re Actually in Love With) You Have a Disability."

Lainoff has also written for the Disability Visibility Project, Washington City Paper, The Washington Post, The Yale Daily News, and more. She has also published poetry with The Yale Daily News

=== One for All ===
Lainoff published her debut novel in 2022 to positive reviews. One for All is a retelling of the The Three Musketeers with a female fencing main character, Tania de Batz, with POTS. de Batz fulfills the role of D'Artagnan in the retelling, spending the novel investigating the mysterious death of her father, a Musketeer. Ableism also is a major theme in the book.

Booklist, which awarded it its prize for Best First Novel for Youth, wrote that "Lainoff’s debut is a rare treat, telling an honest story about a disabled protagonist in a historical setting without infantilizing the character or glossing over her experience." Reviewer Alaina Leary added "Reading as a person with dysautonomia, it was an incredibly powerful experience for this reviewer to see how Tania’s newfound community sees the whole of who she is, which means recognizing the complexity of her disabled identity, as well.”

NPR described the book as a "Lupin-esque tale... one of disguise, intrigue, seduction, and non-stop action."

=== Disabled Kitlit Writers ===
Lainoff founded Disabled Kidlit Writers (not to be confused with Kody Keplinger and Corinne Duyvis's Disability in Kidlit) in 2019. As of September 2026, the group has 580 members. The Facebook group is a collective of disabled young adult and children's authors.

== Bibliography ==
- One for All (2022). ISBN 978-1-2508-6658-5
- "Thy Creature" (2025). In Dyer, Madeline (ed.). These Bodies Ain't Broken. ISBN 979-8-8900-3303-1
- "Much Ado About Sadie" (2026). In Nijkamp, Marieke (ed.). Boundlesss. ISBN 978-0-3743-9367-0

== Awards and Honors ==
Year	Work	Award	Awarding Body	Reference
2023	One for All	Best Fiction for Young Adults	Young Adult Library Services Association	
2022	One for All	Best of the Best	Chicago Public Library	
2022	One for All	Best Book of the Year	NPR	
2022	One for All	Gold Standard selection	Junior Library Guild	
2022	One for All	Best First Novel for Youth	Booklist	
2022	One for All	Best Young Adult Books Of 2022	Buzzfeed	
2022	One for All	Best Young Adult Novels of 2022	Paste Magazine	
2019	"How to Tell That Guy You’ve Been Dating, Your Boyfriend, or Your Friend (Whom You’re Actually in Love With) You Have a Disability"	Literary Award in short fiction	Los Angeles Review	
2017		Spirit of the Sport Honoree	USA Fencing	
