= The Rake's Progress =

Opera by Igor Stravinsky

- Opera by Igor Stravinsky
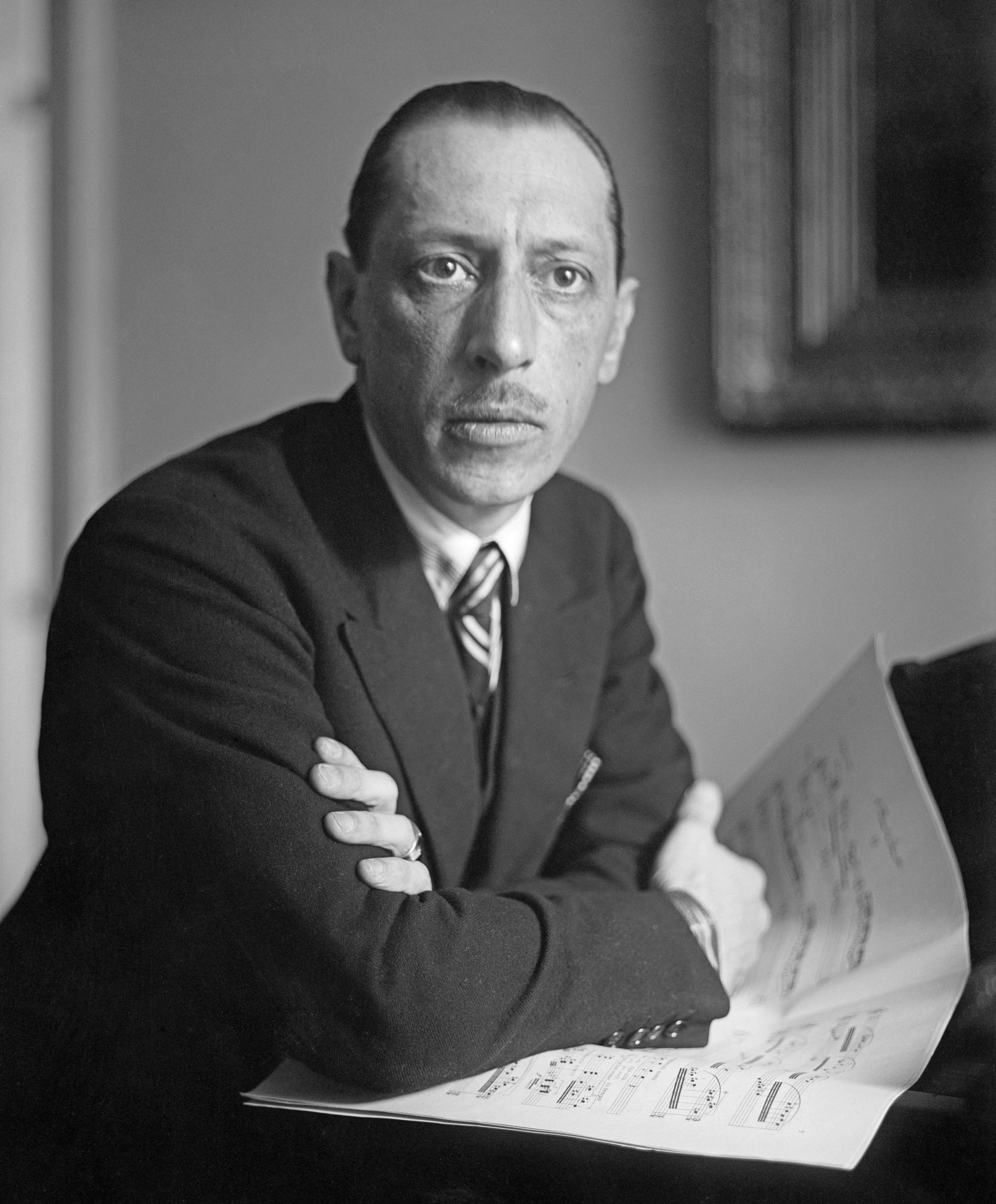
- The composer
- Librettist: W. H. Auden; Chester Kallman
- Based on: A Rake's Progress by William Hogarth
- Premiere: 11 September 1951; Teatro La Fenice, Venice

The Rake's Progress is an English-language opera from 1951 in three acts and an epilogue by Igor Stravinsky. The libretto, written by W. H. Auden and Chester Kallman, is based loosely on the eight paintings and engravings A Rake's Progress (1733–1735) by William Hogarth, which Stravinsky had seen on 2 May 1947, in a Chicago exhibition.

The story concerns the decline and fall of one Tom Rakewell, who deserts Anne Trulove for the delights of London in the company of Nick Shadow, who turns out to be the Devil. After several misadventures, all initiated by the devious Shadow, Tom ends up in Bedlam, a hospital for the insane at that time situated in the City of London. The moral of the tale is: "For idle hearts and hands and minds the Devil finds work to do."

== Performance history ==
It was first performed at the Teatro La Fenice in Venice on 11 September 1951, with Robert Rounseville as Tom Rakewell, Elisabeth Schwarzkopf as Anne Trulove, and Otakar Kraus as Nick Shadow. It was first given in Paris at the Opéra-Comique on 18 June 1952, under the baton of André Cluytens and produced by Louis Musy.

The American premiere was on 14 February 1953, at the Metropolitan Opera in New York, conducted by Fritz Reiner and produced by George Balanchine. Although the BBC had previously produced a studio recording (broadcast on 2 January 1953), and the Glyndebourne Opera mounted a staged production at the King's Theatre in Edinburgh in August 1953, the first staging in England was by the same company at the Glyndebourne Festival itself, opening on 15 July 1954.

In 1957, it was a part of the first season of the Santa Fe Opera under the direction of John Crosby, who persuaded the composer to attend rehearsals. Stravinsky returned to the SFO each summer through 1963. In 1961, Ingmar Bergman produced the opera at the Royal Swedish Opera in Stockholm, where it opened on 22 April. The noteworthy 1975 Glyndebourne Festival Opera production was directed by John Cox, used sets and costumes were designed by David Hockney, and starred Leo Goeke as Tom Rakewell.

In 2010 the Berlin Staatsoper debuted Krzysztof Warlikowski's production, which transported the action from England to America and set it in the 20th century. The production was full of references to American culture, such as Andy Warhol.

In 2015, the Utah Opera produced the opera with the costumes and set designed by David Hockney, first seen at Glyndebourne in 1975. Utah Symphony music director Thierry Fischer conducted, with stage direction by Roy Rallo, who assisted John Cox during San Francisco Opera's 2000 revival.

In 2015, Portland Opera presented the David Hockney production. The conductor was Ari Pelto and the major roles were taken by Jonathon Boyd, David Pittsinger, Maureen McKay and Angela Niederloh.

== Roles ==
Role	Voice type	Premiere cast, 11 September 1951 (Conductor: Igor Stravinsky)
Tom Rakewell, a Rake	tenor	Robert Rounseville
Anne Trulove, his Betrothed	soprano	Elisabeth Schwarzkopf
Nick Shadow, a Devilish Manservant	bass-baritone	Otakar Kraus
Baba the Turk, a Bearded Lady	mezzo-soprano	Jennie Tourel
Father Trulove, Anne's Father	bass	Raffaele Arié
Sellem, an Auctioneer	tenor	Hugues Cuénod
Mother Goose, a Whore	contralto	Nell Tangeman
Keeper of the Madhouse	bass	Emanuel Menkes

== Instrumentation ==
Stravinsky scored the opera for a classical-sized orchestra of two flutes (one doubling piccolo), two oboes (one doubling cor anglais), two clarinets, two bassoons, two horns, two trumpets, timpani, bell, harpsichord (or piano) and strings.

== Synopsis ==
=== Act 1 ===
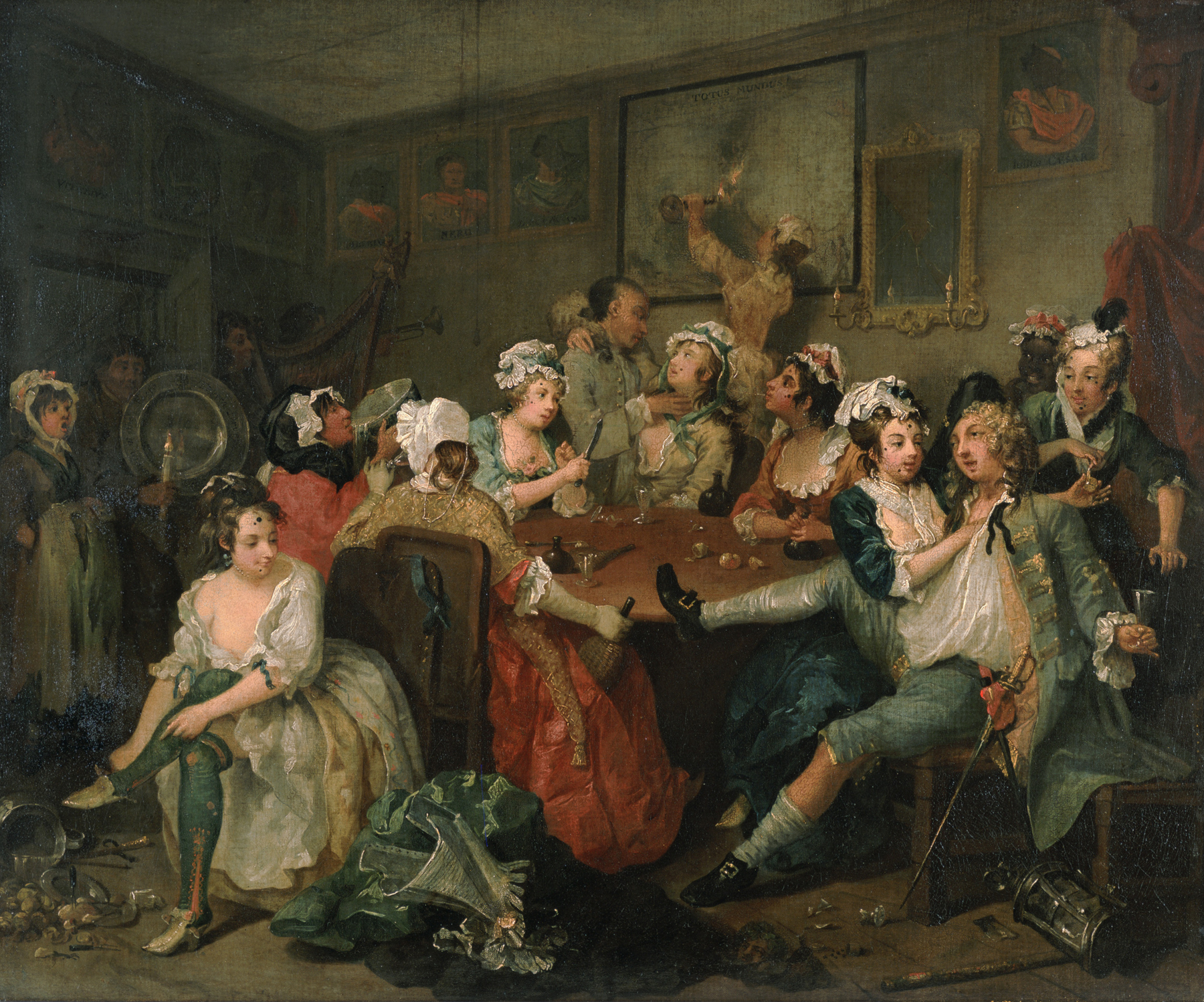
Hogarth's third painting, showing Tom experiencing a brothel in London

Tom Rakewell is courting Anne Trulove outside her father's house in the country. Father Trulove has doubts about his daughter's proposed marriage and tries to arrange a regular job for Tom; but Tom resists the idea and, left on his own, declares his intention to "live by my wits and trust to my luck." When Tom expresses his wish for money, Nick Shadow appears and tells him that an unknown uncle has left him a substantial fortune. He then invites Tom to employ him as a servant and accompany Tom to London to sort out the inheritance.

The second scene, set in Mother Goose's brothel, shows Shadow introducing his new master to the sleazy aspects of London life. But Tom is uneasy and laments his betrayal of love, yet accepts Mother Goose's invitation to spend the night with her. Meanwhile, back in the country, Anne wonders why she has not heard from Tom. She knows somehow that he is in danger, and sets out for London to aid him.

=== Act 2 ===
Tom is bored with his dissolute life. He utters his second crucial wish, for happiness, whereupon Nick makes the odd suggestion that he demonstrate his freedom by marrying Baba the Turk, the famous bearded lady. Soon afterwards Anne finds Tom's London house, only to see him emerge from a sedan chair which also contains Baba, whom he has just married. Tom tells Anne to leave, yet genuinely regrets what has happened.

In the next scene Tom is clearly finding his eccentric marriage intolerable, as Baba is a chatterbox with a fiery temper. He silences her by throwing his wig over her face, then falls asleep. Nick enters with a "fantastic Baroque Machine" and demonstrates how, through the use of a hidden compartment in the machine, it appears to turn stones into bread. Tom cries out in his sleep that he wishes it were true, and waking, finds the machine he has dreamt of. Nick hints that if such machines were mass-produced Tom could become a saviour of mankind and Tom sets out to market the machine, not knowing it is a sham.

=== Act 3 and Epilogue ===
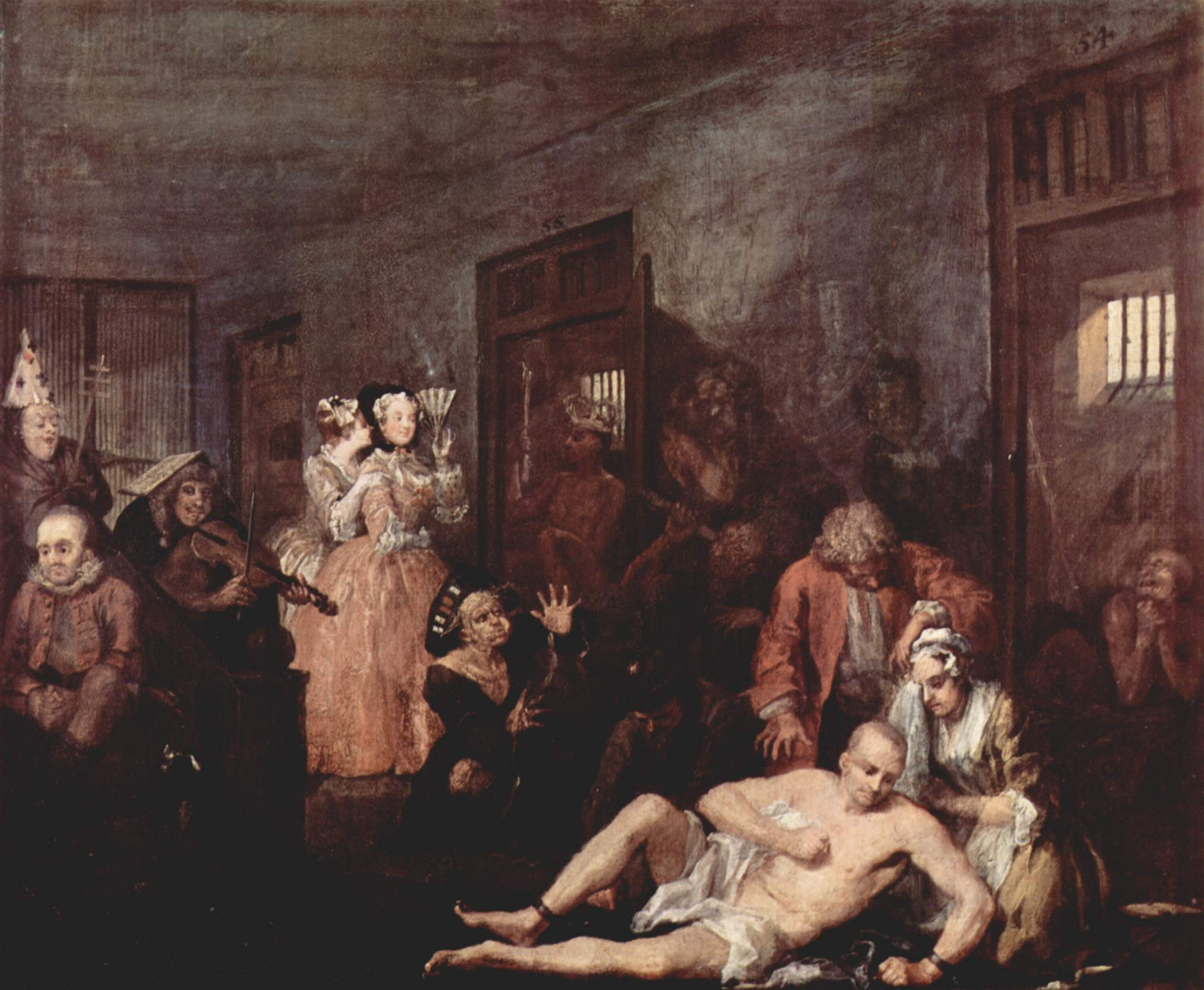
Tom in Bedlam, comforted only by Sarah Young (Anne in the opera) – the last of Hogarth's paintings.

The plan has failed – the act starts with the auction of the ruined Tom's property by the maniac auctioneer Sellem. The objects for sale include Baba, who has remained immobile since being silenced by the wig. When unwrapped, she resumes her tantrum, now directed at the auction-goers for disturbing her belongings, but calms down when Anne enters. Baba advises her to find Tom and "set him right", and warns her against Nick Shadow. She announces her intent to return to her life on the stage.

In a graveyard, Nick reveals his identity and demands payment from Tom, in the form of his soul; but as midnight strikes, Nick offers him an escape in the form of a game of cards; this section is accompanied only by harpsichord. Tom wins, thanks to the benign influence of Anne. Defeated, Nick sinks into the ground, condemning Tom to insanity as he goes. Consigned to Bedlam, Tom believes he is Adonis. Anne ("Venus") visits him, sings him to sleep, then quietly leaves him. When he realises she has gone, he dies.

In an epilogue, each of the principal characters gives a moral drawn from their scenes in the opera, and then come together to ascribe a final joint moral, "for idle hands, and hearts and minds, the Devil finds work to do."

== Noted arias ==
- Shadow's Aria ("Come, master, observe the host of mankind.")
- Shadow's Departure ("I burn! I freeze!")
- Anne's Aria ("No word from Tom.")
- Tom Rakewell's Aria ("Here I stand...")
- Tom Rakewell's 2nd Aria (“Love Too Frequently Betrayed”)
- Tom Rakewell's 3rd Aria (“Vary the Song”)
- Baba the Turk's Aria and Monologue ("As I was saying, both brothers wore moustaches...")
- Anne's Lullaby ("Gently, little boat")

== Quotes ==
Shadow (goading Tom into further ridiculous behaviour):

No eye his future can foretell
No law his past explain
Whom neither Passion may compel
Nor Reason can restrain.

== Recordings ==
There have been at least eight recordings of the opera. The Gala recording of the 1951 live performance is available. A Sony recording, with Judith Raskin as Anne and John Reardon as Nick Shadow, is from London 1964 and is conducted by Stravinsky himself. It is currently available on the Sony/BMG 22-CD box set Works of Igor Stravinsky.

Year	Cast (Tom, Anne, Nick, Baba)	Conductor, opera house and/or orchestra	Label
1953	Eugene Conley, Hilde Gueden, Mack Harrell, Blanche Thebom	Igor Stravinsky, Metropolitan Opera Chorus and Orchestra	CD: Naxos, Catalogue No: 8.111266-67 (Original recording issued by Columbia)
1964	Alexander Young, Judith Raskin, John Reardon, Regina Sarfaty	Igor Stravinsky, Sadler's Wells Opera Chorus, Royal Philharmonic Orchestra	CD: Sony (Original recording issued by Columbia)
1983	Philip Langridge, Cathryn Pope, Samuel Ramey, Sarah Walker	Riccardo Chailly, London Sinfonietta and Chorus	CD: DECCA
1993	Jon Garrison, Jayne West, John Cheek, Wendy White	Robert Craft, Gregg Smith Singers, Orchestra of St. Luke's	CD: Naxos, Catalogue No: 8.660272-73, (original recording issued by Musicmasters Classics)
1995	Jerry Hadley, Dawn Upshaw, Samuel Ramey, Grace Bumbry	Kent Nagano, Lyon Opera Orchestra and Chorus	CD: Erato; Cat. No. 0630 12715-2
1997	Anthony Rolfe-Johnson, Sylvia McNair, Paul Plishka, Jane Henschel	Seiji Ozawa, Tokyo Opera Singers, Saito Kinen Orchestra	CD: Philips
1999	Ian Bostridge, Deborah York, Bryn Terfel, Anne-Sofie von Otter	John Eliot Gardiner, Monteverdi Choir, London Symphony Orchestra	CD: Deutsche Grammophon
2010	Paul Groves, Dawn Upshaw, Samuel Ramey, Stephanie Blythe	James Levine, Metropolitan Opera Orchestra and Chorus	CD: Metropolitan Opera

== Sources ==
- Fuller, John. W. H. Auden: A Commentary. London: Faber and Faber, 1998. ISBN 0-571-19268-8 (cased); ISBN 0-571-19272-6 (pbk). Princeton, New Jersey: Princeton University Press, 1998. ISBN 0-691-00419-6 (cased); ISBN 0-691-07049-0 (pbk.)
- Griffiths, Paul, with Igor Stravinsky, Robert Craft, and Gabriel Josipovici. Igor Stravinsky: The Rake's Progress. Cambridge Opera Handbooks. Cambridge: Cambridge University Press, 1982. ISBN 0-521-28199-7
- Mendelson, Edward. Later Auden. London: Faber, 1999. ISBN 0-571-19784-1. New York: Farrar, Straus and Giroux, 1999. ISBN 0-374-18408-9
