= Parables (oratorio) =

Parables is an oratorio by Robert Aldrige to a libretto by Herschel Garfein. The work commissioned by the Topeka Symphony Orchestra and premiered in May 2010.

== Recordings ==
- Parables - Monica Yunus, Adriana Zabala, Joseph Okell, Philip Zawisza, University of Minnesota Choruses, University of Minnesota Symphony Orchestra, Kathy Saltzman Romey. DVD Naxos, 2013
