= Elmer Gantry (disambiguation) =

Elmer Gantry is a 1927 novel by Sinclair Lewis.

Elmer Gantry may also refer to:

- Elmer Gantry (film), a 1960 adaptation of the novel
- Elmer Gantry (opera), another adaptation, which premiered in 2007
- Gantry (musical), a 1970 Broadway adaptation of the novel Elmer Gantry
- Elmer Gantry, stage persona of musician Dave Terry of Elmer Gantry's Velvet Opera and Stretch (band)
- Elmer Gantry, played by Buster Keaton in Spite Marriage (1929 film)
- Elmer Gantry, name of a race horse in Pride of the Blue Grass (1939 film)
