= Jane Frank (disambiguation) =

Jane Frank was an American artist.

Jane Frank may also refer to:

- Jane Harman (born 1945), married name Jane Frank, U.S. Representative
- Jane Ring Frank, conductor
