= Kate Gale =

American poet

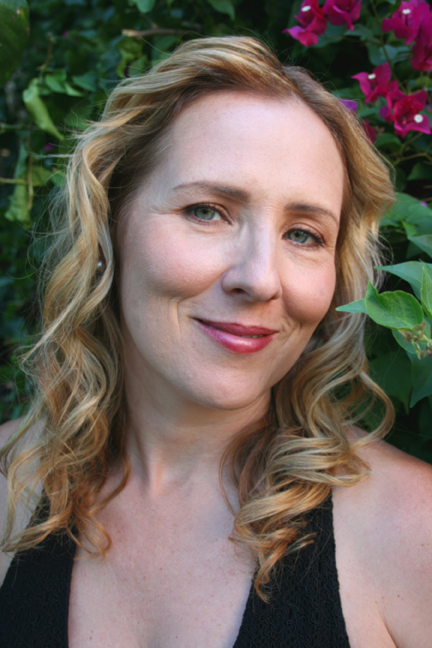
Kate Gale

Kate Gale (born 1966) is an American author, poet, librettist, and independent publisher. She is the publisher of Red Hen Press.

== Life ==
Kate Gale was born in Binghamton, New York to Stephen Gale and Evadene Swanson. She graduated with a B.A. in English from Arizona State University. She received an M.A. in English with a creative writing emphasis from California State University Northridge in 1990 and a Ph.D. in English from Claremont Graduate University in 2003.

== Career ==
Gale, along with her husband Mark E. Cull, founded Red Hen Press in 1994. Gale is the managing editor of Red Hen Press; the editor of the Los Angeles Review, which is also part of Red Hen Press; and the past president of the Los Angeles chapter of the American Composers Forum. She was the 2005-2006 president of PEN USA and serves on the board of the School of Arts and Humanities of Claremont Graduate University and Poetry Society of America. She teaches in the Low Residency MFA program at the University of Omaha and at the MFA in Creative Writing Program at San Diego State University. Gale is an author for HuffPost.

== Works ==
Gale's work began with Blue Air, a book of poetry published by Garden Street Press, San Luis Obispo. She published three collections of poetry with Red Hen Press: Where Crows and Men Collide, Selling the Hammock, and Fishers of Men. Mating Season was published by Tupelo Press in 2004. She has also written the librettos to two operas. Rio de Sangre, with composer Don Davis, was showcased at Walt Disney Concert Hall in 2005, by the New York City Opera VOX in May 2007 and had its world premiere on October 22, 2010 with the Florentine Opera Company in Milwaukee. Paradises Lost, co-written with Ursula K. Le Guin with composer Stephen Taylor, was showcased at the New York City Opera VOX in 2006. In 2014, Kate published two poetry collections: Goldilocks Zone, by the University of New Mexico Press, and Echo Light, by Red Mountain Press—winner of the Red Mountain Press Editor's Award. 2016 saw the appearance of The Palm Trees Are Restless: Five Poems of Kate Gale, a song cycle by composer Mark Abel released on the Delos label. The piece is a setting of texts from Echo Light sung by soprano Hila Plitmann. Kate Gale's The Loneliest Girl and The Goldilocks Zone were published by the University of New Mexico Press. Her novel Under a Neon Sun was published by Three Rooms Press in 2024. She is now the publisher of Red Hen Press.

== Awards ==
- Allen Ginsberg Poetry Award
- Claremont Graduate University Fellowship
- Mitchell Lathrop Fellowship
- Red Mountain Press Editor's Award

== Bibliography ==
- The Loneliest Girl (University of New Mexico Press, 2022)
- Echo Light (Red Mountain Press, 2014)
- Goldilocks Zone (University of New Mexico Press, 2014)
- The Crucifix is Down (Red Hen Press, 2005) (ed.)
- Mating Season (Tupelo Press, 2004)
- Fake-City Syndrome (Red Hen Press, 2002) (ed.)
- Lake of Fire (Winter Street Press, 2000)
- Blue Cathedral (Red Hen Press, 2000) (ed.)
- Fishers of Men (Red Hen Press, 2000)
- African Sleeping Beauty (Blue Beginnings Publishing, 2000)
- Selling the Hammock (Red Hen Press, 1998)
- Anyone is Possible (Red Hen Press, 1997) (ed.)
- Where Crows and Men Collide (Red Hen Press, 1995)
- Water Moccasins (Title Wave Press, 1994)
- Blue Air (Garden Street Press, 1993)

== Librettos ==
- Río de Sangre with composer Don Davis
- Paradises Lost with Ursula K. Le Guin and composer Stephen Andrew Taylor
- Inner Circle adapted from the novel by T. C. Boyle with composer Daniel Felsenfeld
- Che Guevara with composer Andrew Bayola
- The Web Opera with composer Michael Roth
- Gargoyles with composer Julia Adolphe
