= Red Hen Press =

American non-profit publishing company

- Founded: 1994
- Founder: Kate Gale and Mark E. Cull
- Country of origin: United States
- Headquarters location: Pasadena, California
- Distribution: Ingram Publisher Services
- Publication types: Books
- Fiction genres: literary fiction and poetry
- Imprints: Arktoi Books and Boreal Books
- Official website: www.redhen.org

Red Hen Press is an American non-profit press located in Pasadena, California, and specializing in the publication of poetry, literary fiction, and nonfiction. The press is a member of the Community of Literary Magazines and Presses, and was a finalist for the 2013 AWP Small Press Publisher Award. The press has been featured in Publishers Weekly, Kirkus Reviews, and Independent Publisher.

Red Hen Press titles have been reviewed in Library Journal, Publishers Weekly, Booklist, Kirkus Reviews, The Washington Post, The New York Times, and other publications. Authors have been interviewed or featured on NPR, PBS Newshour, in The Boston Globe, Southern Review of Books, and other venues. Authors representative of the poets and writers the press publishes include Chris Abani, Jan Beatty, Camille Dungy, Gaylord Brewer, Aimee Liu, Ron Carlson, Nickole Brown, and Steve Almond.

== History ==
Red Hen Press was founded in 1994 by Mark E. Cull and Kate Gale. The press was reorganized as a non-profit 501(c)(3), getting its federal exemption in 2004. It established a Writing in the Schools program in 2003, which has received funding from the Los Angeles County Arts Commission, the Los Angeles Department of Cultural Affairs, the Kinder Morgan Foundation, the City of Pasadena Cultural Affairs, Sony Pictures Entertainment, the Rose Hills Foundation, the Dwight Stuart Youth Fund, the Macy's Foundation, and the Ahmanson Foundation.

It has held reading series at the Ruskin Art Club, Boston Court Performing Arts Center, Annenberg Beach House, and the Geffen Playhouse. The press has received funding from the National Endowment for the Humanities for a poetry lecture and discussion series.

== Imprints ==
Red Hen Press has eight imprints: Arktoi Books, Boreal Books, Canis Major Books, Crooked Hearts, DJS Books, Pig Hog Press, Story Line Press and Xeno Books.

Arktoi Books was established in 2006 by Eloise Klein Healy and publishes literary fiction and poetry by lesbian writers. It publishes at least one book every year, by new and established authors, such as Celeste Gainey’s The Gaffer, and Veronica Reyes, whose Chopper! Chopper! Poetry from Bordered Lives won the 2014 Golden Crown Literary Society Award, the 2014 International Latino Book Award, and was a finalist for the 2014 Lambda Literary Award.

Boreal Books was established in 2008 and focuses on literature and fine art from Alaska, such as Nicole Stellon O’Donnell’s Everything Never Comes Your Way, and Mark Rozema’s Road Trip. It is edited by Peggy Shumaker, State Laureate Writer of Alaska.

Red Hen Press has also published many artist's books by Welsh printmaker Shirley Jones.

== See also ==
- Los Angeles Review
