= Eloise Klein Healy =

- Born: 1943 (age 82–83); El Paso, Texas
- Occupations: Poet, professor
- Writing career
- Notable awards: First Poet Laureate of Los Angeles, 2012, Grand Prize of the Los Angeles Poetry Festival
- Literary movement: Feminist movement

Eloise Klein Healy (born 1943) is an American poet who writes predominantly about sexuality, identity, community, and feminism. Over the span of 46 years, she has published ten works, many of which have gained recognition and received awards. Healy was chosen to be the first Poet Laureate of Los Angeles in 2012. In addition to being a poet, Healy is also a feminist and LGBTQ+ advocate.

== Personal life ==
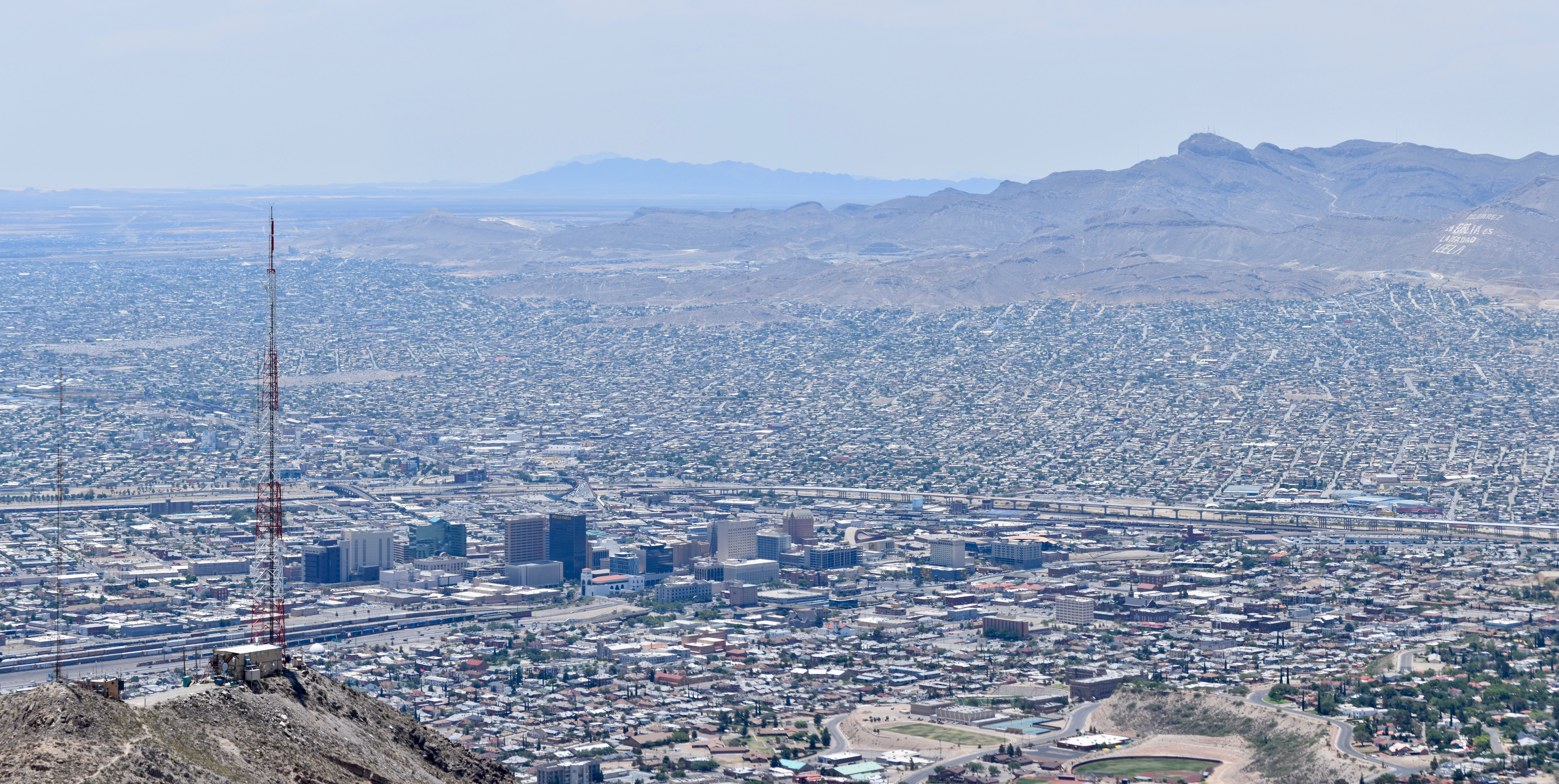
El Paso, Texas: Healy's birthplace

Healy was born in 1943 in El Paso, Texas, and grew up in rural Remsen, Iowa. However, she has spent most of her life in Los Angeles. When Healy is not writing, she enjoys Chinese brush painting and baseball—hobbies that have made an occasional appearance in her poetry.

A few months after being named Poet Laureate of Los Angeles, Healy contracted viral encephalitis. This illness eventually caused aphasia, a disorder that affects one's ability to process and understand language. Healy had to "get language back" by relearning how to read and write. While recovering, she had to redevelop parts of her brain. This consisted of reconnecting words to objects or concepts, understanding word classes like nouns and verbs, and sometimes, learning language from square one. With the help of her spouse, Colleen Rooney, and therapist, Betty McMicken, Healy has been able to recover from this condition.

== Career ==
Healy graduated from Immaculate Heart College, a Catholic university in Los Angeles. After completing her undergraduate degree, Healy began teaching as she continued to grow as a poet. In her late thirties, she decided to go to graduate school, pursuing an MFA. In her years as an educator, Healy taught at Immaculate Heart College, was the Director of a Women's Studies Program and a professor at California State University Northridge, was a Distinguished Professor of Creative Writing Emerita and the Founding Chair of the MFA in Creative Writing at Antioch University, and finally, Healy taught a Feminist Studio Workshop, was part of staff for the Women's Graphic Center, and served as a member of the Board of Directors at the Woman's Building in the mid-1980s, a West Coast feminist cultural center.

After 42 years, she retired from teaching in 2006 and began putting all of her time into poetry. Healy has published seven books of poetry and three chapbooks, many of which have won awards. Her published works include Building Some Changes (1976), A Packet Beating Like a Heart (1981), Artemis in Echo Park (1991), Women's Studies Chronicles (1998), Passing (2002), Ordinary Wisdom (2005), The Islands Project (2007), A Wild Surmise: New & Selected Poems & Recordings (2013), Another Phase (2018), and A Brilliant Loss (2022).

Due to the age of Building Some Changes, there is little information on the poetry within the book.

Her chapbook A Packet Beating Like a Heart includes themes of identity, growth, relationships, and reflection. This work contains several poems that highlight her experience in Los Angeles, "Entries: LA Log" being an example. This poem depicts Healy traveling in a car on the freeway. As she drives, she reflects on her life in Los Angeles, noting both the beauty and exhaustion that comes from living in the city. Additionally, there is a live recording of this chapbook being read at The Women's Building in 1980.

Artemis in Echo Park is also connected to Los Angeles, which can be assumed due to her mention of Echo Park, a neighborhood in Los Angeles, home to her suburban life.

There is no information available to the public on Women's Studies Chronicles.

Passing discusses Healy's experience losing significant individuals in her life such as a parent, as well as the inclusion of several elegies for her friends that she has lost due to AIDS and breast cancer. Using a combination of elegies, lyricism, and more, she reflects on the Civil Rights Movement, gender identity, and community. Healy explores several themes including grief, loss, and power.

Ordinary Wisdom was written during her stay at Dorland Mountain Colony, an artists retreat in the Temecula Valley within Southern California. Healy did not have access to electricity or a phone while at the retreat, giving her a cleanse from the distractions of reality. She writes about the typical routines of life and the simplicity of it all. After the retreat, a wildfire destroyed Dorland Mountain Colony in May 2004. Healy reflects on her memories at the artists retreat, noting the beauty of its setting for writing poetry.

The Islands Project: Poems for Sappho includes work that is mainly written to the Ancient Greek poet Sappho. Healy converses with Sappho, understanding the historical differences and complexity of relating herself as an ordinary poet, to Sappho, an ancient Greek Goddess. Many of these poems also discuss Healy's struggle with watching her mother's aging.

A Wild Surmise: New & Selected Poems & Recordings is the first published book of Healy's that includes QR codes which link to audio recordings of her poetry. In addition to new poetry, Healy also showcases work from previous books such as Building Some Changes, Artemis in Echo Park, and The Islands Project . She writes about the city, nature, hobbies, feminism, lesbianism, love and death, and other subjects. Healy described poetry as nearly impossible to translate, yet always worth the effort, which is why she named the collection "a wild surmise."

Another Phase (2018) shares Healy's experience with contracting encephalitis in 2013 that led to aphasia, a brain disorder which affects the ability to process and understand language. Although this condition impacted her life as a poet, poetry was the motivation to strive toward recovery. This collection includes five-line poems that Healy created as she struggled with the disorder, relearned language, and followed her recovery process.

Finally, A Brilliant Loss (2022) is a collection which is also influenced by Healy's journey with aphasia. The poems analyze the intricacy of language and its connection to one's self. Healy invites the reader into her world and experience with losing a significant aspect of her life.

== Publications ==
=== Individual works ===
- Artemis In Echo Park: Poetry, Firebrand Books, 1991, ISBN 9780932379900
- Building Some Changes, (chapbook), (A Beyond Baroque New Book), Beyond Baroque Foundation, 1976, OCLC: 2462676
- The Islands Project, Red Hen Press, 2007, ISBN 978 1597090858
- Ordinary Wisdom, Red Hen Press, 2005, ISBN 978 1597090568
- A Packet Beating Like a Heart, (chapbook), Books of a Feather, 1981, OCLC: 8463876
- Passing, Red Hen Press, 2002, ISBN 978-1888996548
- Another Phase, Red Hen Press, 2018, ISBN 978-1-59709-042-1
- A Brilliant Loss, Red Hen Press, 2022, ISBN 978-1-63628-061-5
- A Wild Surmise: New & Selected Poems & Recordings, Red Hen Press, 2013, ISBN 978-1597097598
- Women's Studies Chronicles (Laguna Poets Series, 99), The Inevitable Press, 1998, ISBN 978-1891281334 (chapbook)

=== Anthologies including her writings ===
- Another City: Writing from Los Angeles, ed. David L. Ulin, City Lights Publishers, 2001, ISBN 978-0872863910
- The Geography of Home: California's Poetry of Place, Heyday Books, 1999, ISBN 9781890771195
- Grand Passion: Poets of Los Angeles and Beyond, principal ed., Suzanne Lummis, Red Wind Books, 1995, ISBN 9780962284793
- Intimate Nature: The Bond Between Women and Animals, eds., Barbara Peterson, Brenda Peterson and Deena Metzger, Ballantine Books, 1999, ISBN 9780449911228
- The World in Us: Lesbian and Gay Poetry of the Next Wave, eds., Michael Lassell, Elena Georgiou, St. Martin's Press, 2000, ISBN 9780312209438

== Feminist Movement ==
Healy's role as an educator, poet, and activist has impacted the feminist movement. Much of her work contains themes of feminism, sexuality, gender identity, and social justice. Compared to present day, these topics were not as widely vocalized in American literature in the late 1970s.

In addition to her own work, Healy is the founding editor of Arktoi Books (2006), an imprint with Red Hen Press, which publishes literary fiction and poetry by lesbian writers. This imprint ensures space for voices that are often underrepresented.

Healy's time at The Women's Building informed both her identity as a feminist and poet. While working at The Women's Building, she taught a feminist studio workshop which distanced itself from Westernized society and focused on a female-centered culture. This way of thinking allowed the writers to explore new avenues which represent and depict life as a woman.

In early 2012, Mayor Antonio Villaraigosa decided to establish a namesake poet of Los Angeles. In December, Healy was chosen out of three finalists to be the first Poet Laureate of Los Angeles at Central Library. This award comes with $10,000 and grants the ability to serve as a literary art ambassador. With feminist themes often being central to her work, this title provided increased recognition and representation of queer identity, sexism, and feminist resistance. Additionally, selecting a woman for this inaugural role challenged the tendency to give men awards for major "firsts" within a community, disrupting the gender barrier.

== Accomplishments ==
- 2000: Founding member of ECO-ARTS LLC, a program which combines sustainable travel and the arts.
- 2003: Passing was a finalist for both the 2003 Lambda Literary Awards in Poetry and the Audre Lorde Award from The Publishing Triangle
- 2006: Founding editor of Aktoi Books
- 2007: The Islands Project: Poems for Sappho won the Golden Crown Literary Society Poetry Award
- 2012: The first Poet Laureate of Los Angeles.
- 2016: Receives the Bill Whitehead Award for Lifetime Achievement from The Publishing Triangle for her dedication as a poet and contributions to the literary and queer communities
- She is currently a Distinguished Professor of Creative Writing Emerita at Antioch University.

Undated

- Won the Grand Prize of the Los Angeles Poetry Festival and has received six Pushcart Prize nominations.
- Building Some Changes received a Beyond Baroque Foundation NewBook Award.
- Won the inaugural Horace Mann Award at Antioch University Los Angeles, highlighting her expertise as a professor.
