= Río de Sangre =

Opera by Don Davis

- Opera by Don Davis
- Kerry Walsh as Antonia and John Duykers as Jesús Guajardo
- Librettist: Kate Gale
- Language: Spanish
- Premiere: 22 October 2010; Florentine Opera, Milwaukee, Wisconsin, United States

Río de Sangre is a Spanish-language opera in 3 acts and 14 scenes by the film score composer of the Matrix trilogy, Don Davis. Kate Gale wrote the original English prose libretto which was translated into Spanish by Alicia Partnoy. Commissioned by the Florentine Opera Company, the work premiered in October 22, 2010 in a production starring soprano Kerry Walsh and tenor John Duykers. The original cast recorded the opera for Albany Records in 2010. The opera is set in an unnamed South American country with a story centering on political intrigue and family tragedy. The role of its main character, Christian Delacruz, the country's newly elected president, was sung by Guido LeBron.
