= Carrie (1952 film) =

1952 American film directed by William Wyler

- Theatrical release poster
- Directed by: William Wyler
- Screenplay by: Ruth Goetz; Augustus Goetz
- Based on: Sister Carrie by Theodore Dreiser
- Produced by: William Wyler; Lester Koenig (associate producer)
- Starring: Laurence Olivier; Jennifer Jones; Miriam Hopkins
- Cinematography: Victor Milner
- Edited by: Robert Swink
- Music by: David Raksin
- Production company: Paramount Pictures
- Distributed by: Paramount Pictures
- Release date: July 17, 1952 (New York)
- Running time: 118 minutes
- Language: English
- Budget: $2 million
- Box office: $1.8 million (U.S. rentals)

Carrie is a 1952 American drama film directed by William Wyler and starring Jennifer Jones and Laurence Olivier. The script is based on the novel Sister Carrie by Theodore Dreiser.

== Plot ==
At the turn of the 20th century, Carrie Meeber leaves her family in a small rural town and heads to Chicago. On the train, she meets salesman Charles Drouet.

In South Chicago, Carrie stays with her sister and her husband Sven, but she loses her sweatshop sewing job after injuring her hand. She connects with Drouet and he takes her to dinner at Fitzgerald's, a fancy restaurant, and gives her $10. Carrie later returns to Fitzgerald's to return the money to Drouet and meets George Hurstwood, the restaurant manager, who is immediately smitten with her.

Carrie moves in with Drouet and pressures him to marry her because the neighbors are gossiping, but he tries to distract her and invites Hurstwood to their home. With Drouet's permission, Hurstwood takes Carrie to the theater while Drouet is on a business trip. Hurstwood and Carrie fall in love. Just before she is about to run away with Hurstwood, she learns that he is married. She confronts him, and he admits that he is married but discloses that he is terribly unhappy.

At the restaurant one night, Hurstwood accidentally locks a timed safe and is left holding $10,000. He tries to return it, but when he learns that his boss intends to give his salary directly to Hurstwood's wife because of his relationship with Carrie, he takes the money to run away with Carrie. The first few days together are blissful, but Hurstwood's boss sends an officer from the bond company to collect the money. Hurstwood cannot secure a job because of the theft and soon he and Carrie are living in poverty.

Carrie becomes pregnant. Hurstwood's wife appears, wanting his signature and his agreement to sell the house that they jointly own. Hurstwood wants his share of the proceeds, but his wife threatens to press charges against him for bigamy if he insists. She had refused to consent to a divorce, which Hurstwood has not told Carrie. Hurstwood tells his wife that he will sign and agree to not request money if she will grant him a divorce.

Carrie loses the baby and tries her luck at acting. Hurstwood learns that his son is due in New York and meets him at the docks. While he is there, Carrie leaves him because she thinks that he will use the opportunity to reenter his family's life.

While Hurstwood drifts further into poverty and becomes homeless, Carrie finds success and fame on the stage. Weak from hunger, Hurstwood visits her at the theater. She has learned from Drouet that Hurstwood took the money to start a life with her and blames herself for his predicament. She wants to make amends with Hurstwood, but he refuses to accept more than a quarter and disappears after toying with the gas burner in her dressing room.

== Cast ==
- Laurence Olivier as George Hurstwood
- Jennifer Jones as Carrie Meeber
- Miriam Hopkins as Julie Hurstwood
- Eddie Albert as Charles Drouet
- Ray Teal as Allen
- Barry Kelley as Slawson
- William Reynolds as George Hurstwood Jr.
- Mary Murphy as Jessica Hurstwood
- Basil Ruysdael as Mr. Fitzgerald
- Walter Baldwin as Carrie's father
- Dorothy Adams as Carrie's mother
- Lester Sharpe as Blum, the elderly tailor
- Melinda Plowman as the next-door neighbour and friend

== Production ==
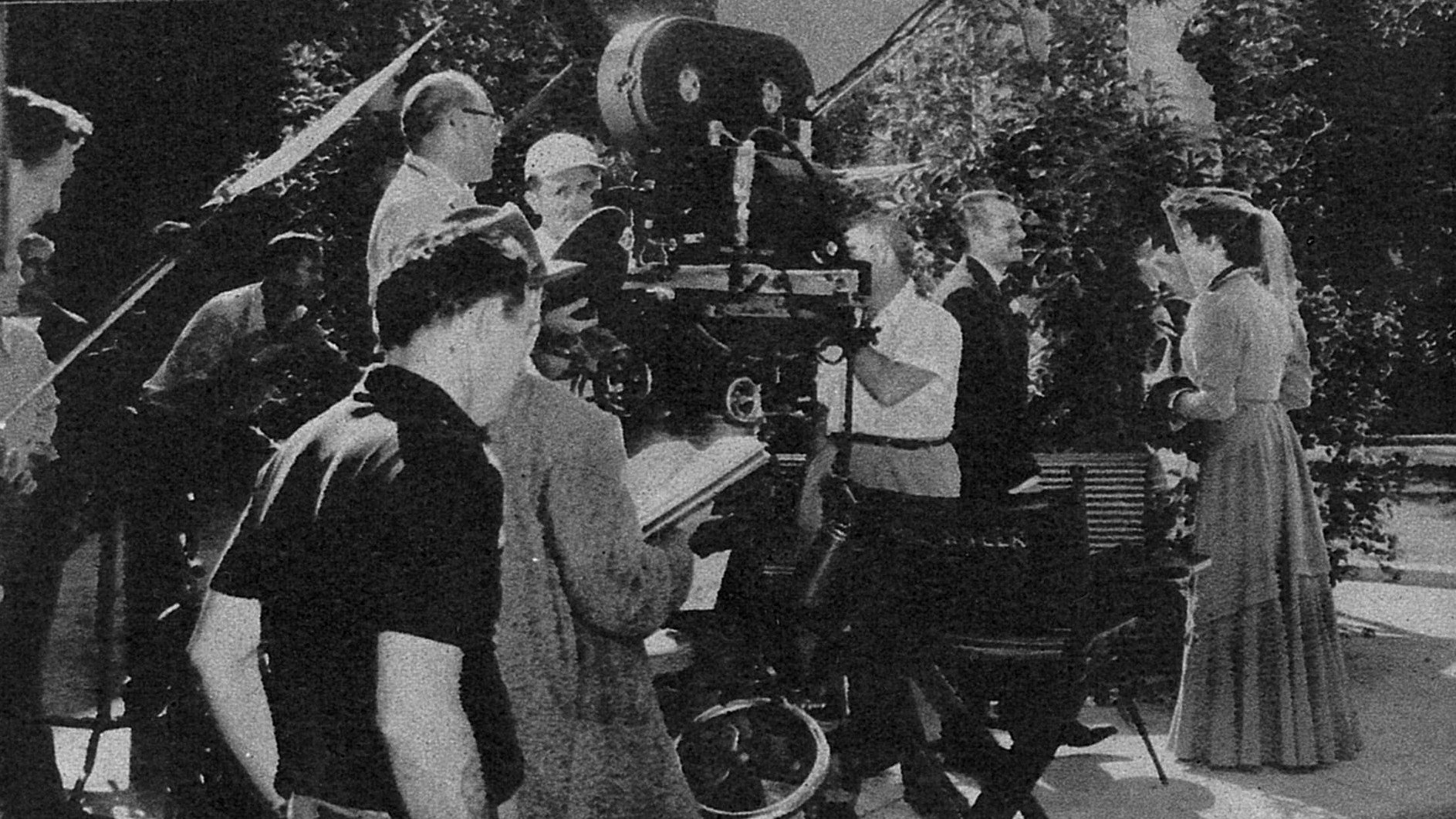
Set photo with camera and sound technicians

The original novel Sister Carrie by Theodore Dreiser was controversial when it was first published in 1900, and when Paramount Pictures first asked for Motion Picture Production Code approval in 1935, the book was rejected. Rights to the book were transferred to Warner Bros. and then to Columbia Pictures and RKO Radio Pictures, but none could acquire approval.

Director William Wyler acquired the rights in 1947 and asked Lillian Hellman and then Arthur Miller to adapt the novel for the screen, but neither was available. Wyler hired Ruth and Augustus Goetz to write the screenplay and added the character of Hurstwood's upstanding business partner in an effort to secure Production Code approval. The Breen Office demanded the excision of Hurstwood's suicide from the script, but Wyler refused.

Wyler asked producer David O. Selznick for assistance with the script, titled Carrie Ames, and Selznick envisioned the title role as a vehicle for his wife, actress Jennifer Jones. He sent Wyler many script suggestions, titles and ideas for leading men, including Laurence Olivier. Wyler interested Olivier in the part after having offered it to Cary Grant. The role marked Olivier's return to Hollywood, where he had not appeared in a film since That Hamilton Woman (1941).

Wyler had initially tried to recruit Elizabeth Taylor for the female lead, but MGM refused, and Ava Gardner and Jeanne Crain were also considered. Selznick was upset that other actresses were courted, believing that Jones had already won the role. Jones was formally announced as the female lead in June 1951.

The production of the film was troubled, as Jones was pregnant, Wyler was grieving the loss of his infant son and Olivier was in pain and hated working with Jones. Selznick frequently complained to Wyler that he was overworking Jones.

Paramount was reluctant to release the film in the political climate of the early 1950s and acquired Wyler's consent to edit the film to present the characters in a more positive light and to remove the suicide scene.

== Release ==
The film's world premiere was held at the Capitol Theatre in New York on July 16, 1952.

== Reception ==
In a contemporary review for The New York Times, critic Bosley Crowther wrote:

Those who have read the old novel will recall that it makes a dubious case for the fundamental virtue and benevolence of its self-seeking heroine. Carrie is a candid opportunist in Mr. Dreiser's book, forced to suppress her surface scruples by the harsh society in which she lives. And her affair with the romantic Hurstwood and her eventual desertion of him when he has lost all and has notl1ing more to give her are indicative of her natural greed. In the Goetzes' conception, however, Carrie is a gentle country girl who is lured by the craftiest deceptions into a career of unwedded wife. ... This arrant distortion of Carrie—and the coy performance Miss Jones gives—reduces the theme of the drama to that of hopeless, deathless love, with most of tl1e human implications and social ironies of the novel removed. And, on this romantic level, the story and the picture becon1e pretty much of a handsome. sentimental display of emotional ecstasies and despairs. As such it is beautifully presented. ... We do not know what is responsible for the pious turn of this film—the moral guardians (with whom Dreiser was familiar) or the commercial caution of the people who turned it out. But it isn't "Sister Carrie'' and it isn't a realistic show. It is a lush and resplendent romance that ends in tears and a drop to Skid Row.

== Awards ==
Carrie received two Academy Award nominations: Costume Design (Edith Head), and Best Art Direction (Hal Pereira, Roland Anderson, Emile Kuri).
