= Leo Goeke =

American opera singer

Leo Goeke (November 6, 1937, Kirksville, Missouri — September 18, 2012, Pittsfield, Massachusetts) was an American operatic tenor who had an active international career from the 1960s through the 1980s. He was particularly admired for his portrayal of Tom Rakewell in The Rake’s Progress at the Glyndebourne Festival in 1975 and its subsequent revivals there in 1977, 1978 and 1980. He was also lauded for his portrayal of Gandhi I in Philip Glass’ Satyagraha which he performed in a production staged by Achim Freyer at the Stuttgart Opera in 1983. Other opera companies which he sang leading roles with included the Metropolitan Opera, the New York City Opera, the Royal Opera, London, the Santa Fe Opera, and the Portland Opera among others.

Goeke was an alumnus of Missouri Teachers College, Louisiana State University, and Iowa State University. He also studied voice at the Metropolitan Opera Studio. From 1994-2004 he was a professor of voice and director of the opera theatre program at DePauw University.
