= Lies Before Kisses =

- Genre: Drama; Thriller
- Written by: Ellen Weston
- Directed by: Lou Antonio
- Starring: Jaclyn Smith; Ben Gazzara; Greg Evigan; Nick Mancuso
- Composer: Don Davis
- Country of origin: United States
- Original language: English

Production
- Producer: Robert Bennett Steinhauer
- Cinematography: Mike Fash
- Editor: Gary Griffin
- Running time: 93 minutes
- Production companies: Grossbart Barnett Productions; Spectacor Films

Original release
- Network: CBS
- Release: March 3, 1991

Lies Before Kisses is a 1991 American made-for-television thriller film directed by Lou Antonio. The film, starring Jaclyn Smith and Ben Gazzara, focuses on the trial against a successful businessman who has allegedly murdered a call girl as a consequence for a blackmailing incident.

== Plot ==
The film opens at the birthday party of Elaine (Jaclyn Smith) and successful businessman Grant's (Ben Gazzara) daughter Abby (Laura Dobbin). A seemingly happy housewife, Elaine is shocked to overhear a romantic phone conversation of Grant and a 20-year-old girl. Elaine confronts her husband, who claims that the affair was nothing more than a one-night stand with a call girl.

Life seems to turn to normal, until one day Grant runs into the call girl, Adrianne Arness (Lisa Rinna), and pictures are taken of their meeting. The pictures, along with photos of a bruised Adrianne, are sent to Elaine. Grant is able to make Elaine believe that Adrianne is setting her up, and inspires her to contact an old family friend, Sonny (Nick Mancuso), to investigate Adrianne on her background and motives. Adrianne sues Grant for abuse. When Adrianne offers to drop the case in exchange for $50,000, Grant gives in to the demand and gives her a late visit to hand over the money.

The next day, Adrianne is found murdered with the money missing, and Grant becomes the prime suspect. Elaine seeks comfort with Sonny, with whom she engages in a sexual affair.

The viewer learns that Ross made the picture of Grant and Adrianne together, and that Elaine has been wanting to ruin Grant's life since finding out about his betrayal. While playing his supporting wife, Elaine conspires with Ross to have Grant convicted for a crime he did not commit. Elaine and Ross's eventual plan is to take over the half of Grant's business and be wealthy forever.

Sonny has found out that Ross was at Adrianne's place when she was murdered, and orders a house warrant to collect proof for it. As expected, he finds the evidence, and Ross is quickly arrested. After bail, Ross confronts Elaine, but Elaine assures him that no evidence will ever lead to her. Elaine is unaware that Ross had Sonny hidden in the room and that Sonny hears Elaine's entire confession and conspiracy. Elaine attempts to seduce him in order not to take a fall, and claims that Ross is responsible for instigating the conspiracy. Sonny dismisses her, though, and announces to make sure to destroy her life, like she did with Grant.

== Cast ==
- Jaclyn Smith as Elaine Sanders, young wife of Grant
- Ben Gazzara as Grant Sanders, a successful businessman
- Greg Evigan as Ross Sanders, Grant's son from an earlier marriage
- Nick Mancuso as Sonny, private investigator and Sanders family friend
- Penny Fuller as Katherine Thomas, Elaine's best friend
- James Karen as Arthur Bridges, Sanders' lawyer
- William Allen Young as Daniel
- Jim Antonio as Richard
- Jean Hale as Veronica
- Clyde Kusatsu as Lieutenant Hand, Sonny's boss
- Lisa Rinna as Adrianne Arness, call girl and one-time mistress of Grant
- Sara Rose Johnson as Sarah Sanders, daughter of Grant and Elaine
- Laura Dobbin as Abby Sanders, daughter of Grant and Elaine
