= Rebecca Garfein =

Rebecca Garfein is a notable hazzan (also called cantor). She was born in Tallahassee, Florida, where she became a regular singer at her father's synagogue. In 1985, thanks to a scholarship from the Shepherd School of Music, Garfein attended Rice University, from which she graduated cum laude with a Bachelor of music. She earned a master's degree in sacred music and was invested as a cantor at HUC-JIR in 1993, after which she became the first cantor of Riverdale Temple in the Bronx, which was then a 53-year-old congregation. She is the first female senior cantor of Congregation Rodeph Sholom in New York City, and was the first female cantor to give a solo concert in Berlin, which she did in 1997, releasing a CD of the concert titled “Sacred Chants of the Contemporary Synagogue" in 1998. In 1998 at the Berlin Jewish Cultural Festival, she became the first female cantor to preside in a German synagogue. In 2001 Garfein was a soloist at the 350th anniversary concert of the Curaçao Jewish community.
