= Jon Garrison =

American tenor (born 1944)

Jon Garrison (né Jon Long; born December 11, 1944, in Higginsville, Missouri) is a successful American operatic tenor who has been performing in locations around the world since 1965. He first appeared at the Metropolitan Opera in 1974, in a secondary role in the company premiere of Death in Venice, which featured Sir Peter Pears. At that theatre, he has since been seen in Gianni Schicchi (as Rinuccio, 1975), Don Pasquale (as Ernesto, directed by John Dexter, 1979), Fidelio (as Jaquino, with Jon Vickers as Florestan, 1980), Wozzeck (as Andres, opposite Anja Silja, 1980), Don Giovanni (as Don Ottavio, 1994), Die Fledermaus (as Alfred, 1995), etc.

Garrison has also appeared at the New York City Opera, debuting as Admète in Alceste, in 1982. It was from that theatre that his performances in La rondine (1985) and Die Zauberflöte (1987) were televised via PBS; in 1986, he portrayed the title role of Werther, opposite Susanne Marsee as Charlotte. He has sung with companies throughout the United States, as well as in Europe, including Robert Wilson's Stuttgart production of Alceste, with Dunja Vejzovic in the name part. The tenor was also heard in the world premieres of Weisgall's The Gardens of Adonis and Reise's Rasputin. In 1996, at the English National Opera, the tenor sang the difficult part of Baron Descartes in Zimmermann's Die Soldaten.

He has made several recordings, including Musgrave's Mary, Queen of Scots (1979), Handel's Roman Vespers (with Judith Blegen, Benita Valente, Maureen Forrester, and John Cheek, 1985, for RCA), Tippett's A Child of Our Time (with the composer conducting, 1991), Stravinsky's The Rake's Progress (with Jayne West, conducted by Robert Craft, 1993) and Haydn's La cantarina (on Newport Classic, with D'Anna Fortunato, 1994).

Garrison lives in Teaneck, New Jersey, and teaches voice and diction classes at Rowan University. He has a son Michael, and a grandson Nikash, who live in Delaware.

== Bibliography ==
- The Metropolitan Opera Encyclopedia, edited by David Hamilton, Simon and Schuster, 1987. ISBN 0-671-61732-X
