= Don Davis (composer) =

American composer (b. 1957)

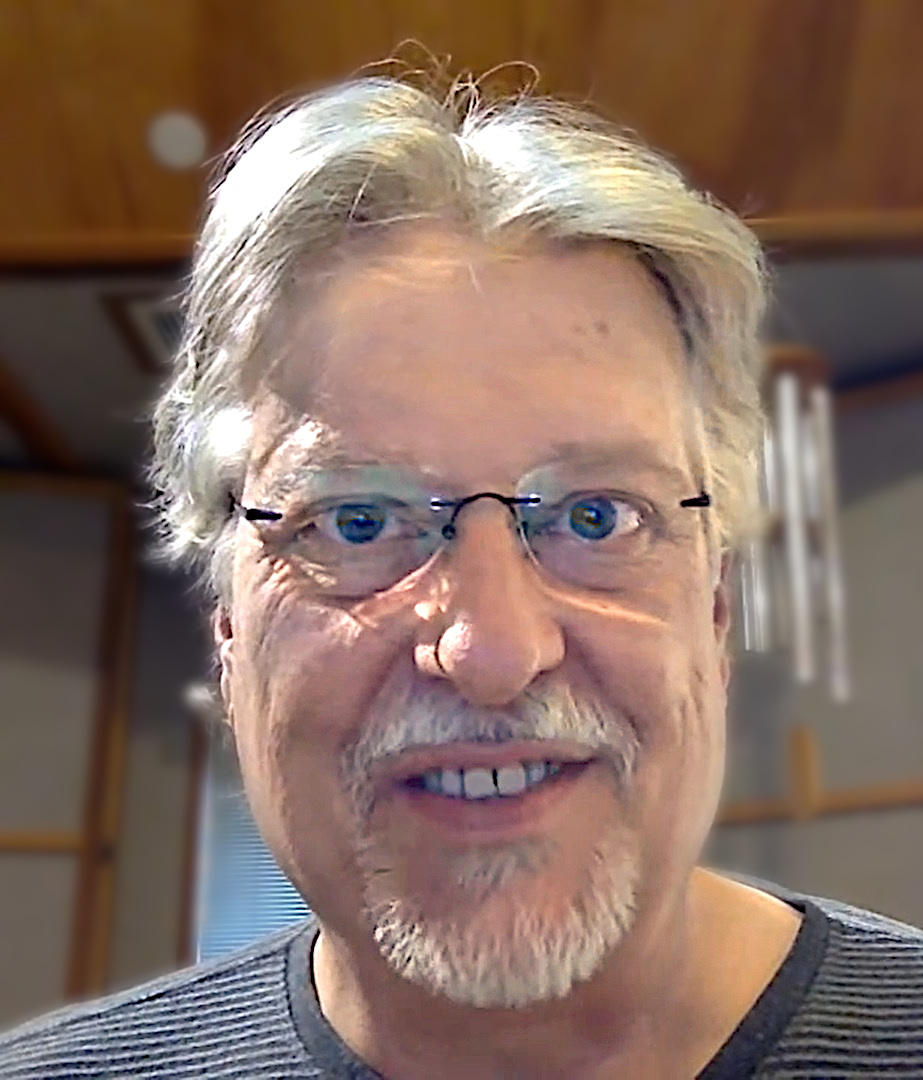
- Davis in 2017

Background information
- Born: Donald Romain Davis; February 4, 1957 (age 69); Anaheim, California, U.S.
- Genres: Film score; contemporary classical
- Occupations: Composer; conductor; orchestrator
- Years active: 1979–present
- Label: Varèse Sarabande; La-La Land Records; Albany Records
- Website: www.dondavis.net

Donald Romain Davis (born February 4, 1957) is an American composer, conductor, and orchestrator known for his film and television scores. He has also composed opera, concert and chamber music. He has collaborated with well-known directors including the Wachowskis, Ronny Yu, and Joe Johnston, in genres ranging from horror, to action, to comedy.

Some of his best known compositions were scores for Beauty and the Beast (1988), My Life and Times (1991), Lies Before Kisses (1991), A Little Piece of Heaven (1992) and seaQuest 2032 (1995), A Goofy Movie (1995), Bound (1996), House of Frankenstein (1998), Universal Soldier: The Return (1999), House on Haunted Hill (1999), and Behind Enemy Lines (2001), and most notably The Matrix (1999), The Matrix Reloaded, The Animatrix, and The Matrix Revolutions (all in 2003).

Davis has been nominated for seven Primetime Emmy Awards, winning in 1995 for Outstanding Music Composition for a Series. He has also won four BMI Film Music Awards.

== Early life and education ==
Davis was born on 4 February 1957 in Anaheim, California. He began playing trumpet and piano at the age of nine, and started writing music at twelve. As his affinity for music grew, so did his aspirations, and soon he was composing and arranging orchestral charts for local jazz ensembles that he also performed with.

After graduating from high school, Davis enrolled at UCLA. He continued his study of musical composition with tutor Henri Lazarof. Additionally, he learned orchestration from Albert Harris.

== Career ==
During their orchestration lessons, Harris introduced Davis to the TV composer Joe Harnell, who supported Davis during his search for work—his first job was working for composer Mark Snow's TV show Hart to Hart. He has worked as an orchestrator and conductor for Michael Kamen, Alan Silvestri, James Horner, Robert Folk, and Randy Newman.

Davis has been nominated seven times at the Primetime Emmy Awards, winning in 1995. He received a nomination for the Primetime Emmy Award for Outstanding Music Composition for a Series for Beauty and the Beast (1988), and for My Life and Times (1991). He received a nomination for Primetime Emmy Award for Outstanding Music Composition for a Limited or Anthology Series, Movie or Special (Original Dramatic Score) for Lies Before Kisses (1991), and A Little Piece of Heaven (1992), and House of Frankenstein (1998). He was twice nominated for the Primetime Emmy Award for Outstanding Music Composition for a Series in 1994 and 1995 for scores in SeaQuest DSV, winning in 1995.

He wrote scores mostly for television series up until 1995, in which he wrote a few of the cues for the animated Disney motion picture A Goofy Movie (1995). He continued to score television series until the two then young directors, the Wachowskis, hired him to score their neo-noir film Bound (1996). Davis has composed scores for films such as Universal Soldier: The Return (1999), Hulk (2003), House on Haunted Hill (1999), and Behind Enemy Lines (2001).

In 2004, he produced the music score for the BBC science fiction documentary series Space Odyssey: Voyage to the Planets, released as Voyage to the Planets and Beyond in the United States. Davis' magnum opus is the Matrix franchise: The Matrix (1999), The Matrix Reloaded (2003), The Matrix Revolutions (2004), and The Animatrix (2002). It was set apart from other film scores of its time for its atonality and avant garde style of composition, with influences from polytonal minimalist works by John Adams and cluster-like as well as aleatoric techniques prominent in the works of composer Witold Lutosławski.

In addition to orchestrating and conducting his own scores, Don Davis has done orchestration work for many other composers. He was the conductor for the movie Flowers in the Attic, whose score was composed by Christopher Young, and for the TV documentary Eagles: Hell Freezes Over. He arranged music for The 86th Academy Awards as well. He is also regular orchestrator for Randy Newman.

Don Davis' political opera, Río de Sangre, premiered at the Florentine Opera Company on October 22, 2010. Excerpts of the opera had previously been performed in Los Angeles with the Los Angeles Master Chorale on November 6, 2005, and the New York City Opera on May 13, 2007.

== Personal life ==
Davis currently splits his time between Southern California and British Columbia, Canada. He has been married to Megan MacDonald since 1986, and they have two children together.

== Filmography ==
=== Film ===
Year	Title	Director(s)	Notes
1984	Hyperspace	Todd Durham	
1988	Blackout	Doug Adams	
1991	Session Man	Seth Winston	Short film
1992	Tiny Toon Adventures: How I Spent My Vacation	Various	Composed with Steven Bramson, Bruce Broughton, Albert Lloyd Olson, Richard Stone, Stephen James Taylor & Mark Watters
1994	A Little Tailor's Christmas Story	Allan Rich	Short film
1996	Bound	The Wachowskis	
1997	Warriors of Virtue	Ronny Yu	
1998	The Lesser Evil	David Mackay	
1999	Turbulence 2: Fear of Flying	David Mackay	
1999	The Matrix	The Wachowskis	
1999	Universal Soldier: The Return	Mic Rodgers	
1999	House on Haunted Hill	William Malone	
2001	Antitrust	Peter Howitt	
2001	Valentine	Jamie Blanks	
2001	Jurassic Park III	Joe Johnston	Jurassic Park themes by John Williams
2001	The Unsaid	Tom McLoughlin	
2001	Behind Enemy Lines	John Moore	
2002	Long Time Dead	Marcus Adams	
2002	Ballistic: Ecks vs. Sever	Kaos	
2003	The Matrix Reloaded	The Wachowskis	
2003	The Animatrix	Various	Composed with Machine Head & Photek
2003	The Matrix Revolutions	The Wachowskis	
2004	Mighty Times: The Children's March	Robert Houston	Documentary short
2006	The Marine	John Bonito	
2007	The Good Life	Steve Berra	
2007	Ten Inch Hero	David Mackay	
2017	Tokyo Ghoul	Kentarō Hagiwara	
2017	A Symphony of Hope	Brian Weidling	Documentary film
2018	Beyond the Sky	Fulvio Sestito	

==== Orchestration work ====
Year	Title	Director	Composer	Notes
1986	Police Academy 3: Back in Training	Jerry Paris	Robert Folk	Additional orchestrator.
1987	Police Academy 4: Citizens On Patrol	Jim Drake	Robert Folk	Additional orchestrator.
1988	The In Crowd	Mark Rosenthal	Mark Snow	
1990	Die Hard 2	Renny Harlin	Michael Kamen	
1991	If Looks Could Kill	William Dear	David Foster	
1991	Hudson Hawk	Michael Lehmann	Michael Kamen	
1991	Robin Hood: Prince Of Thieves	Kevin Reynolds	Michael Kamen	
1991	Ricochet	Russell Mulcahy	Alan Silvestri	
1992	Death Becomes Her	Robert Zemeckis	Alan Silvestri	
1992	The Muppet Christmas Carol	Brian Henson	Miles Goodman; Paul Williams	Uncredited
1993	Cop and a Half	Henry Winkler	Alan Silvestri	
1993	Last Action Hero	John McTiernan	Michael Kamen	Uncredited
1993	Hocus Pocus	Kenny Ortega	John Debney	
1993	We're Back! A Dinosaur's Story	Simon Wells	James Horner	
1993	The Pelican Brief	Alan J. Pakula	James Horner	
1994	When a Man Loves a Woman	Luis Mandoki	Zbigniew Preisner	Also composed additional music
1994	Clean Slate	Mick Jackson	Alan Silvestri	Uncredited
1994	Maverick	Richard Donner	Randy Newman	
1994	Thumbelina	Don Bluth Gary Goldman	Barry Manilow; William Ross	Uncredited
1994	I Love Trouble	Charles Shyer	David Newman	
1994	Clear and Present Danger	Phillip Noyce	James Horner	
1994	The Pagemaster	Joe Johnston Pixote Hunt	James Horner	
1994	Legends of the Fall	Edward Zwick	James Horner	Uncredited
1995	A Goofy Movie	Kevin Lima	Carter Burwell	Also composed additional music and conducted
1995	Casper	Brad Silberling	James Horner	
1995	Apollo 13	Ron Howard	James Horner	Uncredited
1995	Toy Story	John Lasseter	Randy Newman	
1995	Balto	Simon Wells	James Horner	Uncredited
1996	James And The Giant Peach	Henry Selick	Randy Newman	Also did song arrangements
1996	The Phantom	Simon Wincer	David Newman	Uncredited
1996	Courage Under Fire	Edward Zwick	James Horner	Uncredited
1996	Ransom	Ron Howard	James Horner	
1996	Michael	Nora Ephron	Randy Newman	
1997	Titanic	James Cameron	James Horner	Additional orchestrator
1998	Pleasantville	Gary Ross	Randy Newman	
1998	A Bug's Life	John Lasseter	Randy Newman	
1998	Lost in Space	Stephen Hopkins	Bruce Broughton	
2000	Meet The Parents	Jay Roach	Randy Newman	
2010	Toy Story 3	Lee Unkrich	Randy Newman	
2017	Cars 3	Brian Fee	Randy Newman	
2019	Toy Story 4	Josh Cooley	Randy Newman	
2019	Marriage Story	Noah Baumbach	Randy Newman	
2026	Toy Story 5	Andrew Stanton	Randy Newman	

=== Television ===
Year	Title	Notes
1983	Square Pegs	2 episodes
1983–84	Hart to Hart	4 episodes
1986	Kay O'Brien	Episode: “Wreck the Halls”
1987	Sledge Hammer!	2 episodes
1987–90	Beauty and the Beast	48 episodes
1990	Matlock	Episode: “The Personal Trainer”
1991	My Life and Times	Episode: “The Collapse of '98”
1990–91	Tiny Toon Adventures	5 episodes
1992	The Plucky Duck Show	Episode: "A Ditch in Time"
1993	Star Trek: The Next Generation	Episode: "Face of the Enemy"
1992–95	Capitol Critters	8 episodes
1993–94	Taz-Mania	4 episodes
1994–95	SeaQuest 2032	13 episodes
1995	CBS Schoolbreak Special	Episode: "Between Mother and Daughter"

==== TV movies, miniseries, and specials ====
Year	Title	Director	Notes
1988	Bluegrass	Simon Wincer	
1988	A Stoning in Fulham County	Larry Elikann	
1988	Quiet Victory: The Charlie Wedemeyer Story	Roy Campanella II	
1989	Home Fires Burning	Glenn Jordan	
1990	Running Against Time	Bruce Seth Green	
1991	Lies Before Kisses	Lou Antonio	
1991	A Little Piece of Heaven	Mimi Leder	
1992	Notorious	Colin Bucksey	
1992	Woman with a Past	Mimi Leder	
1993	Country Estates	Donald Petrie	
1993	Murder of Innocence	Tom McLoughlin	
1994	In the Best of Families: Marriage, Pride & Madness	Jeff Bleckner	
1994	Leave of Absence	Tom McLoughlin	
1995	Sleep, Baby, Sleep	Armand Mastroianni	
1996	For Love Alone: The Ivana Trump Story	Michael Lindsay-Hogg	
1996	In the Lake of the Woods	Carl Schenkel	
1996	The Beast	Jeff Bleckner	
1996	The Perfect Daughter	Harry Longstreet	
1996	Doomsday Virus	Eric Laneuville	
1997	Alibi	Andy Wolk	
1997	Not in This Town	Donald Wrye	
1997	A Match Made in Heaven	Paul Wendkos	
1997	Weapons of Mass Distraction	Stephen Surjik	
1997	The Third Twin	Tom McLoughlin	
1997	House of Frankenstein	Peter Werner	
1998	The Lake	David Jackson	
1998	Life of the Party: The Pamela Harriman Story	Waris Hussein	
1998	Route 9	David Mackay	
1999	In the Company of Spies	Tim Matheson	
2000	Hell Swarm	Tim Matheson	
2000	Race Against Time	Geoff Murphy	
2000	Personally Yours	Jeffrey Reiner	
2002	Murder in Greenwich	Tom McLoughlin	
2004	Space Odyssey	Joe Ahearne	Documentary
2006	Augusta, Gone	Tim Matheson	

== Other works ==
- Chronym I for flute (1977)
- Trio for violin, viola & cello (1978)
- 12 Poems For Jonathan David Wolf for soprano & piano (1978)
- Chamber Concerto (1978)
- Timbral Spectra (1979)
- Chamber Variations (1979)
- Chronym II (1980)
- Chamber Symphony (1981)
- Chronym III (1981)
- Symphony (1982)
- Bleeding Particles (1983)
- Harsh (1988)
- Bleak (1989)
- The Eye And The Pyramid (1990)
- Going On (1991)
- Green Light (1992)
- What Is The Silence (1993)
- Afterimages (1994)
- Of The Illuminated (1995)
- Flurry (1996)
- No Exit (1996)
- The Enchanted Place Suite (1997)
- Pain (1998)
- Illicit Felicity (1999) - Excerpt from “Bound” score
- Critical Mass (2000)
- Wandering (2002)
- A Lunatic Air (On Fire) (2002)
- Río de Sangre (2005) - Opera in three acts
