= Los Angeles Review =

- Language: English

Publication details
- Publisher: Red Hen Press (United States)
- Frequency: annual

Standard abbreviations
- ISO 4: Los Angel. Rev.

Indexing
- ISSN: 1543-3536
- LCCN: 2003214752
- OCLC no.: 639069671

Links
- Journal homepage

The Los Angeles Review is an annual print and online literary journal. It was established in 2003.

Dr. Kate Gale, managing editor of Red Hen Press, is its editor. Reportedly, each issue is dedicated to a West coast writer.

It has been presenting awards for writers. In 2016, the Los Angeles Review has introduced awards for: Short Fiction; Flash Fiction; Creative Nonfiction and Poetry. In it ran 'Poetry Event' that year.
