= Elmer Gantry (opera) =

2007 opera by Robert Aldridge

- by Robert Aldridge
- Librettist: Herschel Garfein
- Based on: Elmer Gantry by Sinclair Lewis
- Premiere: November 2007; Tennessee Performing Arts Center, Nashville, Tennessee

Elmer Gantry is a 2007 American opera by Robert Aldridge to a libretto by Herschel Garfein based on the 1927 novel by Sinclair Lewis of the same name. The Nashville Opera presented the world première in November 2007.

Elmer Gantry was conceived almost two decades before its première. The Boston Lyric Opera and Boston Music Theatre Project put on a workshop production of the first act in 1992. An agreement was made to move forward on a full production which Boston Lyric later dropped. John Hoomes, the artistic director of the Nashville Opera, picked up production in 2003 after previewing the opera at a new works showcase.

== Performances ==
Elmer Gantry premiered in 2007 at the Nashville Opera, with a subsequent performance at Montclair State University in 2008. The Florentine Opera Company of Milwaukee, Wisconsin, produced the opera in March 2010, which was recorded and released on CD by Naxos Records. A third production was completed at the University of Minnesota in November 2010. The opera was performed in March 2014 at the Tulsa Opera. Opera Santa Barbara performed Elmer Gantry in May 2026.

== Accolades ==
The Naxos recording of the Florentine Opera Company's March 2010 production won two 2011 Grammy Awards.

== Synopsis ==
=== Act 1 ===
The opera opens in a tavern where Elmer Gantry, captain of the Terwillinger College and Seminary football team, is regaling his friends, including roommate Frank Shallard, with tales of sexual exploits. A young man approaches and taunts Elmer, saying that he "plays football for a sissy bible school". Elmer responds by accusing him of insulting Jesus, and sucker punches him. A chaotic fight ensues.

The next day, Elmer is called to a prayer meeting by Reverend Baines, the president of Terwillinger. He is offered a full scholarship to seminary for his supposed defense of Jesus, and is invited to convert. Elmer is distracted by Baines' beautiful daughter Lulu, who is engaged to Eddie Fislinger, the head of the campus YMCA. With persuasion from Eddie and lustful thoughts toward Lulu, Elmer decides to accept the scholarship and fakes his conversion.

Eighteen months later while still in seminary, Elmer is hocking farm implements in a nearby town and having an affair with Lulu. He decides to attend a revival meeting held by the famous traveling evangelist, Sharon Falconer. At this meeting he becomes entranced by Falconer. Lulu arrives with Frank to convince him to come clean about their affair, but Elmer chases her away. He approaches Sharon, but is treated with indifference. After she leaves he becomes angry at this rejection.

Some time later, Elmer is a successful business man in Zenith, Missouri. He encounters Sharon Falconer again whilst she is in Zenith campaigning the Elks' club to help build a "grand tabernacle". With a rousing speech he influences the Elks' club vote and wins Sharon's favor.

Six months later Eddie and Lulu are married and living in Cato, Missouri. Eddie learns of Elmer's endeavor with Falconer to build a tabernacle in Zenith and becomes overwhelmed with hatred and envy.

=== Act 2 ===
Elmer becomes a business partner to Sharon Falconer and confesses his love to her. She reciprocates, but affirms commitment to her religious calling.

Construction begins on the grand tabernacle, financed by TJ Rigg, a local businessman. Eddie, Lulu and Rev. and Mrs. Baines visit the site and privately express their disapproval of the commercial nature of the tabernacle, while Lulu shows renewed romantic interest in Elmer. Frank also visits and expresses his concern about the price of Elmer's success. A debate about old and new practices in religion follows.

A year later, the affair between Elmer and Lulu is reignited with a secret plan by Eddie and Lulu to expose Elmer's deceit. Elmer meets Lulu for a tryst in the nearly completed tabernacle while Eddie looks on in hiding.

Elmer has asked Sharon to marry him and she agrees, despite her recognition of his faults. The night before the tabernacle's opening, she prays for guidance. As a final touch on the tabernacle, a giant cross of electric lights is suspended above the stage.

During the lively grand opening of the tabernacle, Eddie and Lulu come forward and expose Elmer's philandering. Elmer admits his guilt and asks Sharon for forgiveness as chaos erupts in the tabernacle. The electric cross shorts cut and the tabernacle catches fire. Horrified by Elmer's deceit, Sharon refuses his help in escaping from the fire; she and her followers burn to death as Elmer escapes.

Some time after the tabernacle fire, Elmer embarks on a new career peddling the platitudes of the "New Thought" movement and meets with Dr. Binch, the founder of the movement. Binch consoles Elmer, but he is haunted by his memory of the tragedy.

== Roles ==
Roles, voice types, premiere cast
Role	Voice type	Premiere cast Conductor: William Boggs
Elmer Gantry	baritone	Keith Phares
Sharon Falconer	mezzo-soprano	Jennifer Rivera
Frank Shallard	tenor	Vale Rideout
Eddie Fislinger	tenor	Frank Kelley
Lulu Baines	soprano	Malinda Haslett
Reverend Baines	bass	Brian Banion
TJ Rigg	bass-baritone	Kristopher Irmiter
Mrs. Baines	mezzo-soprano	Olivia Ward
Revival Singer	baritone	Chauncey Packer

== Recordings ==
The Florentine Opera's March 2010 recording of Elmer Gantry has been released on the Naxos label. At the 54th Annual Grammy Awards on February 12, 2012, the recording was awarded Grammys for Best Engineered Album, Classical (awarded to Byeong-Joon Hwang & John Newton, engineers; Jesse Lewis, mastering engineer), and Best Contemporary Classical Composition (awarded to Robert Aldridge and Herschel Garfein).
