= Florentine Opera =

- Formation: 1933
- Type: Opera company
- Location: Milwaukee, Wisconsin, United States
- Music director: Francesco Milioto
- Website: www.florentineopera.org

The Florentine Opera Company is one of Wisconsin's oldest professional performing arts centers and the sixth-oldest opera company in the United States. The company presents three to five staged productions per season largely from the standard operatic repertoire. The productions take place at the Marcus Center in downtown Milwaukee, Wisconsin.

== History ==
The Florentine Opera was founded in 1933 by John-David Anello. At that time, the group was called the Italian Opera Chorus, and it met at the Jackson Street Social Center. In 1942, the group became The Florentine Opera Chorus, remaining under the direction of John D. Anello. He explained that the change in name "was to honor the birthplace of opera as we know it. The craft originated in the Italian city of Florence, which has been known as a bustling center for the arts for many centuries." By this time, the chorus had grown to a group of 100 members of many nationalities, with a waiting list of over 100 more. In the program of the first "Opera Album" after the name change is written the Florentine Opera Chorus motto: "If our song has stopped one heart from aching, we have not lived in vain."

In 1950, the Florentine Opera Chorus extended its efforts from operatic choral performances to the production of complete operas and the company became a private venture, changing its name one final time to the Florentine Opera Company. Over the past decade, the Florentine Opera has premiered several new American operas. It produced the American premiere of Lowell Liebermann's opera The Picture of Dorian Gray in 1999. In 2009, the Florentine presented Robert Aldridge and Herschel Garfein's Elmer Gantry. A world premiere of Don Davis' Spanish language Río de Sangre opened in 2010. Another Aldridge opera, Sister Carrie, premiered in 2016.

== Legacy ==
Maggey Oplinger serves as the General Director and CEO of the Florentine, as of 2019. William Florescu was General Director from 2005 to 2018. Francesco Milioto was named Artistic Advisor in 2019 and Music Director in 2023. Joseph Rescigno was the Principal Conductor and Artistic Advisor, having served from 1981-2018. Benjamin Rivera was appointed Chorus Master in 2019. Scott Stewart was the Chorus Master and Associate Conductor from 1978-2019. The Milwaukee Symphony Orchestra serves as the orchestra in performances for the Florentine Opera.

== Notable performers ==
Notable performers at the Florentine Opera have included Diane Alexander, June Anderson, Angela Brown, José Carreras, James Courtney, Gilda Cruz-Romo, Plácido Domingo, Dale Duesing, Marisa Galvany, Anthony Dean Griffey, Jerome Hines, Lise Lindstrom, Spiro Malas, Susanne Marsee, James McCracken, Erie Mills, Sherrill Milnes, Raquel Montalvo, Jan Peerce, Luciano Pavarotti, Ewa Podleś, Samuel Ramey, Natalia Rom, Beverly Sills, Erika Sunnegårdh, Harry Theyard, and Richard Tucker.

== Associations and funding ==
The Florentine Opera is a charter member organization of the United Performing Arts Fund and receives funds from the city of Milwaukee, Milwaukee County, the state of Wisconsin, corporations such as the Target Corporation, patrons and foundations such as the Bradley Foundation, and individuals. The Florentine Opera Company is a member of Opera America.
