= Jane Ring Frank =

American conductor (born 1960)

- Born: 1960 (age 65–66); Los Angeles, California, U.S.
- Occupation: Choral Conductor

Jane Ring Frank (born 1960 in Los Angeles, California) is a female American Choral Conductor who leads music publisher E.C. Schirmer's Philovox Recording Chorus. She founded the Boston Secession, which is a professional chorus, in 1996, and was the Artistic Director until they disbanded in 2009. She was named Music Director of the Cantemus Chamber Chorus (Essex County, MA) in 2011.

== Personal life ==
Ring Frank attended California State University at Long Beach where she studied conducting under Frank Pooler. Her Hollywood connections are deep as her Uncle Lawrence Frank along with Walter Van de Kamp founded Lawry's the Prime Rib and associated restaurants such as the Tam O'Shanter and the Five Crowns in the greater Los Angeles area where the regulars were the stars Fatty Arbuckle, John Wayne, Walt Disney and Tom Mix.

Her mother Blanche was also well connected to Hollywood. Blanche Ring Frank's great-aunt was Blanche Ring. an American singer and actress in Broadway theatre productions, musicals, and Hollywood motion pictures who was also featured on many tobacco silks and cards.

== Early career ==
Ring Frank's professional career began early in life recording back-up vocals for The Carpenters. After college she served as associate conductor of the 70-voice University Choir, staff pianist, lecturer, and musical director and conductor for the California State University, Long Beach's Department of Theatre Arts. Ring Frank moved to Boston, Massachusetts in 1991 to accept a conducting position at Harvard University.

== Professional career ==
A voting member of The Recording Academy, in 1996 Ring Frank founded Boston Secession a 25-member professional chorus based in Boston, Massachusetts as a vehicle to champion new music, music by women composers, and through her programming style of combining narrative with the music to explore the concert's theme allow the audience to experience a deeper connection with the piece and the performers. Ring Frank has re-scored the classic films Wings of Desire; Like Water for Chocolate; Orpheus; and The Seventh Seal where she replaces the original vocal and musical soundtrack with a live musical performance of instrumentalists and vocalists who recreate the film's narrative via music.

Ring Frank served from 1998 to 2003 as the Director of Chapel Music at the Episcopal Divinity School in Cambridge, Massachusetts collaborating with Archbishop Desmond Tutu, Bishop Emeritus of Cape Town, South Africa.

Ring Frank is a Resident Scholar at the Women's Studies Research Center at Brandeis University where she met composer Ruth Lomon who would later become Composer-in-Residence for her professional group Boston Secession. The pair are currently working on the World Premier of Lomon's concert length oratorio Testimony of Witnesses based on the poetry and writings of survivors and victims of the Holocaust. The work is scheduled for World Premier in March 2009 in Cambridge, Massachusetts.

While at Brandeis Ring Frank organized the Festival of Women Composers in 2004.

In addition to her responsibilities with Boston Secession Ring Frank is conductor of Philovox; the publishing house of E.C. Schirmer's resident professional recording chorus. She holds a faculty position at Emerson College, Conducts the Concord Women's Chorus, a 50-voice women's chorus, and serves as Director of Music at the First Congregational Church in Winchester, Massachusetts.

Ring Frank has toured extensively as a guest lecturer, choral/instrumental conductor, and pianist in Vienna, Australia, Munich, Prague, Stockholm, Poland and the United States.

== Recordings ==
Ring Frank has recorded four CDs:

- An Apple Gathering (1999) (1997)
- Songs of Remembrance
- Afterlife: German Choral Meditations on Mortality (2005)
- Surprised by Beauty: Minimalism in Choral Music (2008).
