= Ruth Lomon =

Canadian composer (1930–2017)

Ruth Lomon (7 November 1930 – 26 September 2017) was a Canadian-American classical composer.

== Life and career ==
A native of Montreal, Canada, she was born in Montreal and died in Cambridge, Massachusetts. She attended le Conservatoire de Quebec and McGill University. She continued her studies with Francis Judd Cooke at the New England Conservatory of Music and later with Witold Lutosławski at Dartington College in England.

In 1951, she moved to the United States and became interested in the music of the American Southwest and the Indigenous peoples from that region.

In 1998, Lomon became Composer/Resident Scholar at the Women's Studies Research Center, Brandeis University. She composed an oratorio, Testimony of Witnesses, for vocal soloists, chorus and orchestra. She was the recipient of a grant from the Hadassah International Research Center (now the Hadassah-Brandeis Institute) for this work. She was commissioned by the Pro Arte Chamber Orchestra, Boston to compose a trumpet concerto, Odyssey, for Charles Schlueter, principal trumpet of the Boston Symphony Orchestra.

During 1995-96, Lomon was a fellow of the Bunting Institute, Radcliffe College, where she composed "Songs of Remembrance," a song cycle on poems of the Holocaust. This hour length work was premiered at Harvard University's John Knowles Paine Concert Hall, and has since had numerous performances including the United States Holocaust Memorial Museum, Washington, D.C. in April 1998, and the IAWM Congress in London, England, in July 1999 where she received the Miriam Gideon Composition award for this work. In 2001, she also received the Chicago Professional Musicians Award for the 10th song of the cycle, which is set for mezzo-soprano, English horn and piano. "Songs of Remembrance" is recorded on the CRI label.

Lomon was composer-in-residence for Boston Secession, a professional choral ensemble directed by Jane Ring Frank. Lomon composed her oratorio Testimony of Witnesses for them and they performed movements of the work from 2000–2008. A full length oratorio based on the poetry of Holocaust victims and survivors, Testimony of Witnesses is scored for chamber orchestra, vocal ensemble, and four vocal soloists. The texts — in Hebrew, French, German, Italian, Polish, English and Yiddish — represent the personal experience of sixteen survivors and victims, including ten individual women and children.

== Selected works list ==
References:

- Dust Devils for harp (1977)
- Celebrations for two harps (1978)
- Five Ceremonial Masks for solo piano (1980)
- Imprints: Concerto for piano and four percussion (1987)
- The Butterfly Effect, string quartet (1989)
- Requiem
- Testimony of Witnesses, oratorio (2008)
