= Robert Aldridge (composer) =

American composer, professor, and current Professor

Robert Livingston Aldridge
- Born: September 7, 1954 (age 71)
- Notable work: Elmer Gantry, opera
- Spouse: Paula Stark
- Children: Micaela Aldridge (b. 1994)

Robert Livingstone Aldridge (September 7, 1954 in Richmond, VA) is an American composer, professor, and current Head of Composition professor, and former Director of Music at the Mason Gross School of the Arts at Rutgers University. He has written over eighty works for orchestra, opera, musical theater, dance, and various chamber ensembles that have been performed in the United States, Europe, and Japan. He is widely known for his opera Elmer Gantry, based on Sinclair Lewis's 1927 novel of the same name. which was completed in 2007 and won Best Engineered Album (Classical) and Best Contemporary Classical Composition in the 54th Annual Grammy Awards.

== Biography ==
Aldridge holds degrees in both composition and English literature. Aldridge received a bachelor's degree in English literature from the University of Wisconsin-Madison, a master's degree in composition from the New England Conservatory of Music, and a doctorate in composition from the Yale School of Music in 2000.

In November 2007, an opera titled Elmer Gantry by Robert Aldridge and with a libretto by Herschel Garfein premiered in the James K. Polk Theater in Nashville.

Parables also with a libretto by Herschel Garfein was a work commissioned by the Topeka Symphony. It premiered in May 2010.

He was professor of composition at Montclair State University in New Jersey. He was appointed director of the music department of the Mason Gross School of the Arts at Rutgers University in 2012.

Robert Aldridge currently lives in Montclair, New Jersey with his wife Paula Stark, a landscape artist. They have one daughter, Micaela Aldridge (b.1994).

== Honors and awards ==
He has received numerous fellowships and awards for his music from the National Academy of Recording Arts and Sciences, the Guggenheim Foundation, the American Academy of Arts and Letters, National Endowment for the Arts, the New York Foundation for the Arts, the Pennsylvania Council on the Arts, the Massachusetts Artist's Foundation, the Lila Wallace Reader's Digest Fund, Meet the Composer, the American Symphony Orchestra League, the New Jersey Council on the Arts and the Geraldine R. Dodge Foundation.

== Works ==
Works
Year	Work	Instrumentation	Premiere Performer
1983	Combo Platter		Marimolin
1984	Summerdance	Chamber ensemble	Beth Soll Dance Company
1986	Fanfare and March	Marching band	Blackstone High School
1986	Concerto for Violin and Percussion	Percussion ensemble	New England Conservatory
1987	Threedance	Violin, marimba, and tablas	Marimolin
1987	Parable of the Blind	Chamber ensemble	The American Dance Festival
1987	Ghosts	String quartet	Boston Composer's String Quartet
1988	From my little Island	Marimba	Nancy Zeltsman
1989	Quartet for an Outdoor Festival	Chamber ensemble	Lincoln-Center-Out-of-Doors
1992	The Concord Trio	Clarinet, horn, and piano	Concord Community Music School
1993	Three Folksongs	Clarinet and string quartet	Pacific Serenades
1996	String Quartet no. 2		The Kucharsky Quartet
1997	Larger Than Life	Musical	developed by Manhattan Theatre Club
1998	Music from 'The Third Person'		Betty Buckley (with Herschel Garfein)
1998	Ecstatic Overture	Orchestra	Norwalk Symphony & Boston Civic Orchestra
1998	Concerto for Violin and Orchestra		Topeka Symphony
1999	Celebration Overture	Orchestra	The Gulf Coast Symphony
1999	SoundMovesBlues		SoundMoves
2000	A Prayer, for a Music		Oregon Festival Chorale
2001	Trio for Violin, Cello, and Piano		The Gramercy Trio
2001	The Third Person	Musical	The York Theatre Company
2002	War Stories	Concert band	Monclair State University Concert Band
2003	Leda and the Swan	Orchestra	The New Jersey Symphony
2004	Clarinet Concerto		LA Chamber Orchestra
2007	Elmer Gantry	Opera	Nashville Opera
2010	Parables	Oratorio	Topeka Symphony Orchestra
2011	Three Waltzes	Piano Solo	Vivian Wang
2016	Sister Carrie	opera	Milwaukee
