= Herschel Garfein =

American composer, librettist and stage director

Herschel Garfein (born January 17, 1958) is an American composer, librettist, stage director, and faculty member of the Steinhardt School of Music at New York University, where he teaches Script Analysis. Garfein is widely known for his libretto written for Robert Aldridge's Elmer Gantry, which won two 2012 Grammy Awards including "Best Contemporary Classical Composition" won by Garfein and Aldridge. He also collaborated with Aldridge on the oratorio Parables. In his compositions for the musical Suenos he found an inspiration in Hispanic rhythms. Garfein also composed the music and libretto for an opera based on the Tom Stoppard play Rosencrantz and Guildenstern are Dead.

Garfein's parents are actress Carroll Baker and film director Jack Garfein, a Czechoslovak Jew, who survived the Holocaust. His sister is actress Blanche Baker.

== Awards and honors ==
- 54th Annual Grammy Awards, 2011: Grammy Award, "Best Contemporary Classical Composition," with Robert Aldridge, for "Elmer Gantry." Herschel Garfein, Librettist.
- 60th Annual Grammy Awards, 2017: Grammy Award, "Grammy Award for Best Large Jazz Ensemble Album" for "Presidential Suite: Eight Variations on Freedom," by Ted Nash Big Band. Herschel Garfein, Producer, with Kabir Sehgal and Douglas Brinkley.
