= List of opera librettists =

This is an incomplete list of authors who have written libretti for operas. Only librettists with their own articles in Wikipedia are listed. The name of the composer of each opera is also given.

== A ==
Giuseppe Adami (1878–1946)

- for Giacomo Puccini: La rondine, Il tabarro, Turandot (with Renato Simoni)
- for Riccardo Zandonai: La via della finestra
- for Franco Vittadini: Anima allegra, Nazareth

Jules Adenis (1823–1900)

- with Henri Caïn
  - for Umberto Giordano: Marcella
- with Charles Grandvallet
  - for Jules Massenet: La grand'tante
- with Édouard Plouvier (1821–1876)
  - for Jacques Offenbach: Un postillon en gage
- with J Rostaing
  - for Ernest Guiraud: Sylvie
- with Jules-Henri Vernoy de Saint-Georges
  - for Georges Bizet: La jolie fille de Perth
- with A Silvestre and L Bonnemère
  - for Henry Charles Litolff: Les templiers

Franco Alfano (1875–1954)

- for his own music: Sakùntala

Louis Anseaume (1721–1784)

- alone
  - for Egidio Duni: L'école de la jeunesse, Le peintre amoureux de son modèle
  - for Christoph Willibald Gluck: L'île de Merlin, ou Le monde renversé, L'ivrogne corrigé
  - for André Grétry: Le tableau parlant
- with Thomas Hales
  - for André Grétry: Le jugement de Midas
- with Pierre-Augustin Lefèvre de Marcouville:
  - for Christoph Willibald Gluck: La fausse esclave
  - for Jean Louis Laruette: La fausse aventurière
  - for Pieter van Maldere: Le Médecin de l'amour

George Antheil (1900–1959)

- for his own music: Transatlantic

Guillaume Apollinaire (1880–1918)

- used by Francis Poulenc: Les mamelles de Tirésias

W. H. Auden (1907–1973)

- alone:
  - for Benjamin Britten: Paul Bunyan
- with Chester Kallman (1921–1975)
  - for Hans Werner Henze: The Bassarids, Elegy for Young Lovers
  - for Nicolas Nabokov: Love's Labour's Lost
  - for Igor Stravinsky: The Rake's Progress

== B ==
Ingeborg Bachmann (1926–1973)

- for Hans Werner Henze: Der junge Lord, Der Prinz von Homburg

Philipp Georg Bader

- for Joseph Haydn: Didone Abbandonata (Dido) (lost), Die bestrafte Rachbegierde (lost)

Carlo Francesco Badini

- for Joseph Haydn: L'anima del filosofo, ossia Orfeo ed Euridice

Béla Balázs (1884–1949)

- for Béla Bartók: Bluebeard's Castle

Luigi Balocchi (1766–1832)

- for Gioachino Rossini: Il viaggio a Reims, Le siège de Corinthe (with Alexandre Soumet), Moïse et Pharaon (with Étienne de Jouy)

Henri Auguste Barbier (1805–1882)

- for Hector Berlioz: Benvenuto Cellini (with Léon Wailly)

Jules Barbier (1825–1901)

- alone:
  - for Jacques Offenbach: The Tales of Hoffmann
  - for Camille Saint-Saëns: Le timbre d'argent
- with Michel Carré:
  - for Charles Gounod: La colombe, Faust, Le médecin malgré lui, Philémon et Baucis, Polyeucte, La reine de Saba, Roméo et Juliette
  - for Giacomo Meyerbeer: Le pardon de Ploermel
  - for Ambroise Thomas: Mignon, Hamlet, Françoise de Rimini

Pierre Beaumarchais (1732–1799)

- used by Antonio Salieri: Tarare

Vladimir Belsky (1866–1946)

- for Nikolai Rimsky-Korsakov: Sadko (in part), The Tale of Tsar Saltan, The Legend of the Invisible City of Kitezh and the Maiden Fevroniya, The Golden Cockerel

Sem Benelli (1877–1949)

- for Umberto Giordano: La cena delle beffe
- for Italo Montemezzi: L'amore dei tre re, L'incantesimo

Hector Berlioz (1803–1869)

- for his own music: Les Troyens, Béatrice et Bénédict

Giovanni Bertati (1735–1815)

- for Domenico Cimarosa: Il matrimonio segreto
- for Giuseppe Gazzaniga: Don Giovanni Tenorio

Thomas Betterton (1635–1710)

- for Henry Purcell: Dioclesian, The Fairy-Queen (probably)

Robin Blaser (1925–2009)

- for Harrison Birtwistle: The Last Supper

Édouard Blau (1836–1906)

- alone:
  - for Édouard Lalo: Le roi d'Ys
- with Georges Hartmann and Paul Milliet:
  - for Jules Massenet: Werther
- with Adolphe d'Ennery and Louis Gallet:
  - for Jules Massenet:Le Cid

Arrigo Boito (1842–1918)

- for Giuseppe Verdi: Simon Boccanegra (revised version), Otello, Falstaff
- for Amilcare Ponchielli: La Gioconda (writing under the pseudonym/anagram Tobia Gorrio)
- for his own music: Mefistofele, Nerone
- for Franco Faccio: Amleto

Jean-Nicolas Bouilly (1763–1842)

- for Luigi Cherubini: Les deux journées
- for André Grétry: Pierre le Grand
- for Étienne Méhul: Le jeune Henri, Une folie, Héléna, Valentine de Milan,

Bertolt Brecht (1898–1956)

- for Paul Dessau: Die Verurteilung des Lukullus
- for Kurt Weill:
  - alone: Der Jasager, Rise and Fall of the City of Mahagonny,
  - with Elisabeth Hauptmann: Happy End, The Threepenny Opera

Georg Büchner (1813–1837)

- used by Alban Berg: Wozzeck

Francis Burnand (1836–1917)

- for Arthur Sullivan: The Chieftain, The Contrabandista, Cox and Box
- for Edward Solomon: Domestic Economy, Pickwick, The Tiger

Giovanni Francesco Busenello (1598–1659)

- for Claudio Monteverdi: L'incoronazione di Poppea
- for Francesco Cavalli: Gli amori d'Apollo e di Dafne, La Didone, La prosperita di Giulio Cesare dittatore , Statira principessa de Persia

Ferruccio Busoni (1866–1924)

- for his own music: Arlecchino, Die Brautwahl, Doktor Faust, Turandot

== C ==
Massimo Cacciari (born 1944)

- for Luigi Nono: Prometeo

Louis de Cahusac (1706–1759)

- for Jean-Philippe Rameau: Anacréon (first Rameau opera by that name), Les Boréades, Les fêtes de l'Hymen et de l'Amour, Naïs, La naissance d'Osiris, Zaïs, Zoroastre

Henri Caïn (1859–1937)

- alone:
  - for Jules Massenet: Cendrillon, La Navarraise, Don Quichotte, Roma, Sapho
  - for Franco Alfano: Cyrano di Bergerac
- with de Croisset – see Francis de Croisset

Italo Calvino (1923–1985)

- for Luciano Berio: La vera storia, Un re in ascolto

Ranieri de' Calzabigi (1714–1795)

- for Christoph Willibald Gluck: Alceste, Orfeo ed Euridice, Paride ed Elena

Salvadore Cammarano (1801–1852)

- for Gaetano Donizetti: L'assedio di Calais, Belisario, Lucia di Lammermoor, Maria de Rudenz, Maria di Rohan, Pia de' Tolomei, Poliuto, Roberto Devereux
- for Giuseppe Verdi: Alzira, La battaglia di Legnano, Luisa Miller, Il trovatore (with Leone Emanuele Bardare)
- for Giuseppe Persiani: Ines de Castro
- for Saverio Mercadante: Elena da Feltre, La vestale, Orazi e Curiazi, Virginia, Il reggente
- for Giovanni Pacini: Saffo

Mark Campbell

- for Mason Bates: The (R)evolution of Steve Jobs
- for Iain Bell: Stonewall
- for William Bolcom: Lucrezia, Dinner At Eight
- for Julian Grant: The Nefarious, Immoral but Highly Profitable Enterprise of Mr. Burke & Mr. Hare
- for Laura Kaminsky: As One, Some Light Emerges, Today It Rains
- for Paul Moravec: The Shining
- for John Musto: Volpone, Later the Same Evening, Bastianello, The Inspector
- for Rene Orth: Empty the House
- for Roberto Scarcella Perino: A Sweet Silence in Cremona
- for Paola Prestini: Edward Tulane
- for Kevin Puts: Silent Night, The Manchurian Candidate, Elizabeth Cree
- for Stewart Wallace: Supermax

Michel Carré (1821–1872)

- alone:
  - for Charles Gounod: Mireille
  - for Jacques Offenbach: La rose de Saint-Flour
- with Eugène Cormon:
  - for Georges Bizet: Les pêcheurs de perles
- with Barbier – see Jules Barbier

Nick Cave (born 1957)

- for Nicholas Lens: Shell Shock

Daniel-Paul Chappuzeau de Baugé (died ca. 1729)

- for Theobaldo di Gatti: Coronis

Ernest Chausson (1855–1899)

- for his own music: Le roi Arthus

Helmina von Chézy (1783–1856)

- for Carl Maria von Weber: Euryanthe

Henry Fothergill Chorley (1808–1872)

- for Arthur Sullivan: The Sapphire Necklace
- for William Vincent Wallace: The Amber Witch

Vittorio Amedeo Cigna-Santi (around 1730-after 1795)

- for Mozart: Mitridate, re di Ponto

Guelfo Civinini (1873–1954)

- for Giacomo Puccini: La fanciulla del West (with Carlo Zangarini)

Jean Cocteau (1889–1963)

- for Arthur Honegger: Antigone
- for Darius Milhaud: Le pauvre matelot
- for Francis Poulenc: La voix humaine
- for Igor Stravinsky: Oedipus rex

J. M. Coetzee (born 1940)

- for Nicholas Lens: Slow Man

Colette (1873–1954)

- for Maurice Ravel: L'enfant et les sortilèges

Marco Coltellini (1719–1777)

- for Christoph Willibald Gluck: Telemaco
- for Hasse: Piramo e Tisbe
- for Joseph Haydn: L'infedeltà delusa
- for Wolfgang Amadeus Mozart: La finta semplice (after Goldoni)
- for Antonio Salieri: Armida
- for Tommaso Traetta: Ifigenia in Aulide, Antigona

Jeremy Commons (born 1933)

- with Ivan Bootham: The Death of Venus

William Congreve (1670–1729)

- used by John Eccles: Semele
- used by George Frideric Handel: Semele
- used by John Eccles, Daniel Purcell, Gottfried Finger and John Weldon: The Judgement of Paris

Eugène Cormon (1810–1903)

- with Michel Carré
  - for Georges Bizet: Les pêcheurs de perles
- with Hector-Jonathan Crémieux
  - for Jacques Offenbach: Robinson Crusoé
- with Lockroy
  - for Aimé Maillart: Les dragons de Villars

Thomas Corneille (1625–1709)

- for Marc-Antoine Charpentier: Médée
- for Jean-Baptiste Lully: Bellérophon (with Bernard Le Bovier de Fontenelle)

Hector-Jonathan Crémieux (1828–1892)

- with E About
  - for Jacques Offenbach: Le financier et le savetier
- with Ernest Blum
  - for Jacques Offenbach: Bagatelle, La jolie parfumeuse
- with Eugène Cormon
  - for Jacques Offenbach: Robinson Crusoé
- with Philippe Gille
  - for Jacques Offenbach: Les bergers
- with Ludovic Halévy
  - for Léo Delibes: Les eaux d’Ems
  - for Jacques Offenbach: La chanson de Fortunio, Jacqueline, Orphée aux enfers, Le pont des soupirs, Le roman comique
- with Ludovic Halévy, M de Saint-Rémy and Ernest Lépine
  - for Jacques Offenbach: M. Choufleuri restera chez lui le . . .
- with Adolphe Jaime
  - for Hervé: Le petit Faust
  - for Jacques Offenbach: Une demoiselle en loterie
- with Adolphe Jaime and Etienne Tréfeu
  - for Jacques Offenbach: Geneviève de Brabant
- with Albert de Saint-Albin
  - for Jacques Offenbach: La foire Saint-Laurent

Michael Cristofer (born 1945)

- for Terence Blanchard: Champion

Francis de Croisset (1877–1937)

- alone:
  - for Reynaldo Hahn: Ciboulette
- with Henri Caïn
  - for Jules Massenet: Chérubin

Eric Crozier (1914–1994)

- for Benjamin Britten: Albert Herring, Billy Budd (with E. M. Forster), The Little Sweep

César Cui (1835–1918)

- for his own music: The Captain's Daughter, A Feast in Time of Plague, Mademoiselle Fifi, The Saracen (with Vladimir Vasilievich Stasov)

== D ==
Gabriele D'Annunzio (1863–1938)

- for Pietro Mascagni: Parisina
- for Alberto Franchetti: La figlia di Iorio

Lorenzo Da Ponte (1749–1838)

- for Wolfgang Amadeus Mozart: The Marriage of Figaro, Don Giovanni, Così fan tutte
- for Vicente Martín y Soler: L'arbore di Diana, Il burbero di buon cuore, Una cosa rara
- for Antonio Salieri: Axur, re d'Ormus

William Davenant (1606–1668)

- for Henry Lawes, Matthew Locke and others: The Siege of Rhodes

Giovanni de Gamerra (1742–1803)

- for Wolfgang Amadeus Mozart: Lucio Silla (revised by Metastasio); Italian adaptation of The Magic Flute
- for Giuseppe Sarti: Medonte, re di Epiro
- for Josef Mysliveček: Il Medonte
- for Antonio Salieri: Palmira, regina di Persia

Constance DeJong (born 1950)

- for Philip Glass: Satyagraha

Casimir Delavigne

Germain Delavigne

Frederick Delius (1862–1934)

- for his own music: Fennimore and Gerda, Irmelin, A Village Romeo and Juliet

Philippe Néricault Destouches (1680–1754)

- for Jean-Joseph Mouret: Les amours de Ragonde

Eduard Devrient (1801–1877)

- for Heinrich Marschner: Hans Heiling

Gaetano Donizetti (1797–1848)

- for his own music: Betly, Il campanello di notte, Le convenienze ed inconvenienze teatrali, Don Pasquale (with Giovanni Ruffini)

John Dryden (1631–1700)

- for Henry Purcell: The Indian Queen (with Robert Howard), King Arthur
- for Louis Grabu: Albion and Albanius

== E ==
Gottfried von Einem (1918–1996)

- for his own music: Dantons Tod (with Boris Blacher)

Adolphe d'Ennery (1811–1899)

- alone:
  - for Charles Gounod: Le tribut de Zamora
- with Édouard Blau and Louis Gallet:
  - for Jules Massenet: Le Cid
- with Jules Brésil
  - for Adolphe Adam: Si j'étais roi
- with Philippe François Pinel Dumanoir and Jules Chantepie:
  - for Jules Massenet: Don César de Bazan

Victor Erofeyev (born 1947)

- for Alfred Schnittke: Life with an Idiot

Hanns Heinz Ewers (1871–1943)

- for Eugen d'Albert: Die toten Augen

== F ==
Mohammed Fairouz (born 1985)

- for himself: Sumeida's Song

Duncan Fallowell (born 1948)

- for Irmin Schmidt composer Gormenghast (opera)

Charles-Simon Favart (1710–1792)

- for Egidio Duni: La fée Urgèle, ou Ce qui plaît aux dames

Lorenzo Ferrero (born 1951)

- for himself: Marilyn, Night, La nascita di Orfeo, La Conquista

Jacopo Ferretti (1784–1852)

- for Gaetano Donizetti: L'ajo nell'imbarazzo, Il furioso all'isola di San Domingo, Olivo e Pasquale, Torquato Tasso, Zoraide di Grenata
- for Saverio Mercadante: Gli amici di Siracusa, Scipione in Cartagine
- for Giovanni Pacini: Cesare in Egitto
- for Luigi Ricci: L'orfanella di Ginevra
- for Lauro Rossi: La figlia di Figaro
- for Gioachino Rossini: La Cenerentola, Matilde di Shabran
- for Niccolò Antonio Zingarelli: Baldovino

Ferdinando Fontana (1850–1919)

- for Giacomo Puccini: Le Villi, Edgar

E. M. Forster (1879–1970)

- for Benjamin Britten: Billy Budd (with Eric Crozier)

Giovacchino Forzano (1884–1970)

- for Giacomo Puccini: Suor Angelica, Gianni Schicchi

Frederick the Great (1712–1786)

- for Carl Heinrich Graun: Montezuma

Carl Friberth (1736-1816)

- for Joseph Haydn: L'incontro improvviso

Christopher Fry (1907–2005)

- for Krzysztof Penderecki: Paradise Lost

== G ==
Kate Gale (born 1965)

- for Don Davis: Río de Sangre

Louis Gallet (1835–1898)

- for Georges Bizet: Djamileh
- for Alfred Bruneau: L'attaque du moulin
- for Charles Gounod: Cinq-Mars, Maître Pierre
- for Jules Massenet: Thaïs, Le Cid, Le roi de Lahore
- for Camille Saint-Saëns: Ascanio, La princesse jaune, Déjanire

John Gay (1685–1732)

- for music arranged by Johann Christoph Pepusch: The Beggar's Opera

Richard Genée (1823–1895)

- with Camillo Walzel
  - for Carl Millöcker: Der Bettelstudent
  - for Johann Strauss II: Cagliostro in Wien, Der lustige Krieg, Eine Nacht in Venedig

Ira Gershwin (1896–1983)

- with DuBose Heyward:
  - for George Gershwin: Porgy and Bess

Antonio Ghislanzoni (1824–1893)

- for Giuseppe Verdi: Aida, La forza del destino
- for Amilcare Ponchielli: I Lituani

Giuseppe Giacosa (1847–1906)

- for Giacomo Puccini: La bohème (with Luigi Illica), Madama Butterfly (with Luigi Illica), Manon Lescaut (with others, including Leoncavallo), Tosca (with Luigi Illica)

W. S. Gilbert (1836–1911)

- for Arthur Sullivan: The Gondoliers, The Grand Duke, H.M.S. Pinafore, Iolanthe, The Mikado, Patience, The Pirates of Penzance, Princess Ida, Ruddigore, The Sorcerer, Thespis, Trial by Jury, Utopia, Limited, The Yeomen of the Guard
- for Thomas German Reed: Eyes and No Eyes, No Cards, Our Island Home, A Sensation Novel
- for Frederic Clay: Ages Ago, Happy Arcadia, Princess Toto, The Gentleman in Black
- for Alfred Cellier: The Mountebanks, Topsyturveydom
- for George Grossmith: Haste to the Wedding
- for Frank Osmond Carr: His Excellency
- for Edward German: Fallen Fairies
- for Alberto Randegger: Creatures of Impulse

Philippe Gille (1831–1901)

- with Edmond Gondinet:
  - for Léo Delibes: Lakmé
- with Henri Meilhac:
  - for Jules Massenet: Manon

Alvise Giusti (1709–1766)

- for Antonio Vivaldi: Motezuma

Nikolai Gogol (1809–1852)

- used by Modest Mussorgsky: Zhenitba (Marriage)

Carlo Goldoni (1707–1793)

- used by Wolfgang Amadeus Mozart: La finta semplice
- used by Niccolò Piccinni: La buona figliuola
- used by Joseph Haydn: Il mondo della luna, Lo speziale, Le pescatrici
- used by Baldassare Galuppi: Il filosofo di campagna
- used by Ermanno Wolf-Ferrari: Il campiello, Le donne curiose, I quatro rusteghi, Gli amanti sposi, La vedova scaltra

Edmond Gondinet (1828–1888)

- alone
  - for Léo Delibes: Le roi l'a dit
- with Ernest Blum and Albert de Saint-Albin
  - for Hervé: Mam’zelle Gavroche
- with Georges Duval:
  - for Robert Planquette: Les Voltigeurs de la 32ème
- with Philippe Gille:
  - for Léo Delibes: Jean de Nivelle , Lakmé

Alice Goodman (born 1958)

- for John Adams: The Death of Klinghoffer, Nixon in China

Vincenzo Grimani (1652/1655–1710)

- for George Frideric Handel: Agrippina

Sydney Grundy (1848–1914)

- for Arthur Sullivan: Haddon Hall
- for Edward Solomon: Pocahontas, The Vicar of Bray

Nicolas-François Guillard (1752–1814)

- for Christoph Willibald Gluck: Iphigénie en Tauride
- for Antonio Salieri: Les Horaces
- for Antonio Sacchini: Chimène, Œdipe à Colone, Arvire et Évélina

== H ==
Daron Hagen (born 1961)

- for his own music:
  - alone: Cradle Song, from New York Stories, Orson Rehearsed
  - with Barbara Grecki: A Woman in Morocco

Thomas Hales (c.1740–1780)

- for André Grétry: L'amant jaloux, Le jugement de Midas

Ludovic Halévy (1834–1908)

- for Jacques Offenbach: Ba-ta-clan
- also see Meilhac and Crémieux

Christopher Hampton (born 1946)

- for Philip Glass: Appomattox, Waiting for the Barbarians

David Harsent (born 1942)

- for Harrison Birtwistle: Gawain

Georges Hartmann (1843–1900)

- for Jules Massenet: Hérodiade, Werther
- for André Messager: Madame Chrysanthème
- for Reynaldo Hahn: L'île du rêve

Nicola Francesco Haym (1678–1729)

- for Giovanni Bononcini: Calfurnia and Astianatte
- for George Frideric Handel: Admeto, Flavio, Giulio Cesare, Ottone, Rodelinda, Siroe, Tamerlano, Teseo, Tolomeo

HAUI (born 1990)

- for HAUI x Sean Mayes: Aportia Chryptych: A Black Opera for Portia White

Philip Hensher (born 1965)

- for Thomas Adès: Powder Her Face

DuBose Heyward (1885–1940)

- with Ira Gershwin:
  - for George Gershwin: Porgy and Bess

Ernest Hilbert (born 1970)

- for Stella Sung: The Red Silk Thread, an Epic Tale of Marco Polo, The Book Collector
- for Daniel Felsenfeld: Summer and All it Brings, The Last of Manhattan

Paul Hindemith (1895–1963)

- for his own music: Die Harmonie der Welt, Mathis der Maler

Russell Hoban (1925–2011)

- for Harrison Birtwistle: The Second Mrs Kong

Hugo von Hofmannsthal (1874–1925)

- for Richard Strauss: Die ägyptische Helena, Arabella, Ariadne auf Naxos, Elektra, Die Frau ohne Schatten, Der Rosenkavalier

François-Benoît Hoffman (1760–1828)

- for Luigi Cherubini: Médée
- for Nicolas Isouard: Les rendez-vous bourgeois
- for Rodolphe Kreutzer: La mort d'Abel
- for Jean-Baptiste Lemoyne: Nephté, Phèdre
- for Étienne Méhul: Adrien, Ariodant, Euphrosine, Le jeune sage et le vieux fou, Stratonice

Basil Hood (1864–1917)

- for Arthur Sullivan: The Emerald Isle (finished by Edward German after Sullivan's death), The Rose of Persia
- for Arthur Bruhns (later reset by Franco Leoni): Ib and Little Christina
- for Cecil Cook: The Willow Pattern
- for Edward German: Merrie England, A Princess of Kensington

Victor Hugo (1802–1885)

- for Louise Bertin: La Esmeralda

David Henry Hwang (born 1957)

- for Philip Glass: The Voyage, 1000 Airplanes on the Roof
- for Osvaldo Golijov: Ainadamar
- for Howard Shore: The Fly

== I ==
Luigi Illica (1857–1919)

- for Alfredo Catalani: La Wally
- for Umberto Giordano: Andrea Chénier, Siberia
- for Pietro Mascagni: Iris, Isabeau, Le maschere
- for Giacomo Puccini: La bohème (with Giuseppe Giacosa), Madama Butterfly (with Giuseppe Giacosa), Manon Lescaut (with others, including Leoncavallo), Tosca (with Giuseppe Giacosa)

Jarosław Iwaszkiewicz (1894–1980)

- for Karol Szymanowski: King Roger (with the composer)

== J ==
Leoš Janáček (1854–1928)

- for his own music: The Cunning Little Vixen, From the House of the Dead, Jenůfa, The Makropulos Affair, Destiny

Scott Joplin (1868–1917)

- for his own music: Treemonisha

Étienne de Jouy (1764–1846)

- for Luigi Cherubini: Les Abencérages
- for Étienne Méhul: Les amazones
- for Gioachino Rossini: Moïse et Pharaon (with Luigi Balocchi), Guillaume Tell (with Hippolyte Bis)
- for Gaspare Spontini: Milton (with Armand-Michel Dieulafoy), La vestale, Fernand Cortez (with Joseph-Alphonse Esménard)

== K ==
Georg Kaiser (1878–1945)

- for Kurt Weill: Der Protagonist, Der Silbersee, Der Zar lässt sich photographieren

Chester Kallman see Auden

Johann Friedrich Kind (1768–1843)

- for Carl Maria von Weber: Der Freischütz
- for Conradin Kreutzer: Das Nachtlager in Granada

Kenneth Koch (1925–2002)

- for Ned Rorem: Bertha

Eliška Krásnohorská (1847–1926)

- for Bedřich Smetana: The Devil's Wall, The Kiss, The Secret, Viola

Clemens Krauss (1893–1954)

- for Richard Strauss: Capriccio

Joseph Felix von Kurz (1717-1784)

- for Joseph Haydn: Der krumme Teufel (lost)

== L ==
Antoine Houdar de la Motte (1672–1731)

- for André Campra: L'Europe galante
- for André Cardinal Destouches: Issé
- for Marin Marais: Alcyone

Ferdinand Lemaire (1832–1879)

- for Camille Saint-Saëns: Samson et Dalila

Kasi Lemmons (born 1961)

- for Terence Blanchard: Fire Shut Up In My Bones

Ruggero Leoncavallo (1857–1919)

- for his own music: Chatterton, I Medici, La bohème, Pagliacci, Zazà
- for Giacomo Puccini: Manon Lescaut (with others, including Giacosa and Illica)

Doris Lessing (1919–2013)

- for Philip Glass: The Making of the Representative for Planet 8

== M ==
Amin Maalouf (born 1949)

- for Kaija Saariaho: L'amour de loin

Daniel MacIvor (born 1962)

- for Rufus Wainwright: Hadrian

Maurice Maeterlinck (1862–1949)

- used by Claude Debussy: Pelléas et Mélisande
- used by Paul Dukas: Ariane et Barbe-bleue

Andrea Maffei (1798–1885)

- for Verdi: I masnadieri

Albéric Magnard (1865–1914)

- for his own music: Bérénice, Guercœur

Jean-François Marmontel (1723–1799)

- for Jean-Philippe Rameau: Acante et Céphise, La guirlande, Les sibarites
- for André Grétry: Le Huron, Lucile, Zémire et Azor
- for Niccolò Piccinni: Atys, Didon, Pénélope, Roland

Caterino Mazzolà (1745–1806)

- for Wolfgang Amadeus Mozart: La clemenza di Tito (after Metastasio)

Henri Meilhac (1831–1897)

- with Philippe Gille
  - for Jules Massenet: Manon
- with Ludovic Halévy
  - for Georges Bizet: Carmen
  - for Jacques Offenbach: Barbe-bleue, La belle Hélène, La Grande-Duchesse de Gérolstein, La Périchole, La Vie parisienne

Anne-Honoré-Joseph Duveyrier de Mélesville (1787–1865)

- for Ferdinand Hérold: Zampa
- with Pierre Carmouche
  - for Jacques Offenbach: La permission de dix heures
- with Eugène Scribe
  - for Jacques Offenbach: La chatte métamorphosée en femme

Guido Menasci (1867–1925)

- with Giovanni Targioni-Tozzetti:
  - for Umberto Giordano: Regina Diaz
  - for Pietro Mascagni: Cavalleria rusticana, I Rantzau, Zanetto

Catulle Mendès (1841–1909)

- for Emmanuel Chabrier: Gwendoline
- for Claude Debussy: Rodrigue et Chimène
- with Ephraïm Mikaël:
  - for Emmanuel Chabrier: Briséïs
- for Jules Massenet: Ariane, Bacchus
- for André Messager: Isoline

Gian Carlo Menotti (1911–2007)

- for his own music: Amahl and the Night Visitors, The Boy Who Grew Too Fast, The Consul, The Island God, The Last Savage, The Medium, The Old Maid and the Thief, The Saint of Bleecker Street, The Telephone, or L'Amour à trois
- for Samuel Barber: A Hand of Bridge, Vanessa

Joseph Méry (1798–1866)

- for Giuseppe Verdi: Don Carlos (with Camille du Locle)

Olivier Messiaen (1908–1992)

- for his own music: Saint François d'Assise

Pietro Metastasio (1698–1782)

- used by J. C. Bach, Riccardo Broschi, Johann Adolph Hasse, Josef Mysliveček, and Giovanni Battista Pergolesi, among others: Adriano in Siria
- used by Christoph Willibald Gluck, Hasse, Mysliveček, and Tommaso Traetta, among others: Antigono
- used by J. C. Bach, Gluck, Hasse, Mysliveček, and Leonardo Vinci, among others: Artaserse
- used by Hasse, Vinci, J. C. Bach, and Antonio Vivaldi, among others: Catone in Utica
- used by Gluck, Hasse, and Mysliveček, among others: Demetrio
- used by Gluck, Hasse, Niccolò Jommelli, Mysliveček, Traetta, and Vinci, among others: Demofoonte
- used by Hasse, Nicola Porpora, and Vinci, among others: Didone abbandonata
- used by Gluck and Wolfgang Amadeus Mozart, among others: Il re pastore
- used by Gluck, Hasse, Jommelli, and Mysliveček, among others: Il trionfo di Clelia
- used by Gluck, Hasse, and Porpora, among others: Issipile
- used by Gluck, George Frideric Handel, Mysliveček, and Porpora, among others: Ezio
- used by Handel, Hasse, Porpora, and Vinci, among others: Alessandro nell'Indie, also known as Poro, re dell'Indie
- used by Gluck, Hasse, and Mysliveček, among others: Ipermestra
- used by Mozart and Mysliveček, among others: La clemenza di Tito
- used by Hasse, Mysliveček, Giovanni Battista Pergolesi, Traetta, and Vivaldi, among others: L'Olimpiade
- used by Hasse, Giacomo Meyerbeer, Mysliveček, Porpora, Antonio Salieri, and Vinci, among others: Semiramide riconosciuta
- used by Handel, Hasse, Porpora, Vinci, and Vivaldi, among others: Siroe
- used by Hasse and Mozart, among others: Il sogno di Scipione
- used by Joseph Haydn, Jommelli, Giovanni Paisiello and Traetta, among others: L'isola disabitata

Giovanni Ambrogio Migliavacca (around 1718-around 1795)

- for Joseph Haydn: Acide e Galatea

Madeleine Milhaud (1902–2008)

- for Darius Milhaud: Médée, Bolivar, La mère coupable

Suzie Miller

- used by Lindy Hume: Snow White

Nicolò Minato (ca. 1630–1698)

- used by Francesco Cavalli: Orimonte
- used by Francesco Cavalli, Alessandro Scarlatti and Giacomo Antonio Perti: Pompeo Magno
- used by Francesco Cavalli, Giovanni Bononcini and George Frideric Handel: Xerse
- used by Antonio Draghi: Leonida in Tegea, La tirannide abbatuta dalla virtù
- used by Antonio Draghi and Marc'Antonio Ziani: Chilonida
- used by Antonio Draghi and Georg Reutter/Antonio Caldara: La patienza di Socrate con due mogli
- used by Antonio Sartorio, Antonio Draghi and Tomaso Albinoni: La prosperità di Elio Sejano

Paul Muldoon (born 1951)

- for Daron Hagen: Shining Brow, Vera of Las Vegas, Bandanna, The Antient Concert

Johann Heinrich Friedrich Müller (1738–1815)

- for Mozart: Bastien und Bastienne (together with Friedrich Wilhelm Weiskern and Johann Andreas Schachtner)

Modest Mussorgsky (1839–1881)

- for his own music: Boris Godunov, The Fair at Sorochyntsi, Khovanshchina, Salammbô

== N ==
Émile de Najac (1828–1899)

- with Paul Burani
  - for Emmanuel Chabrier: Le roi malgré lui
- with Paul Ferrier
  - for Lecocq: La vie mondaine

Charles Nuitter (1828–1899)

- for Jacques Offenbach: Les bavards, Les fées du Rhin

== O ==
Meredith Oakes (born 1946)

- for Thomas Adès: The Tempest

Marc Okrand (born 1948)

- for Eef van Breen: ʼuʼ

Martin Opitz (1597–1639)

- for Heinrich Schütz: Dafne (lost)

John Oxenford (1812–1877)

- for George Alexander Macfarren: Robin Hood, Helvellyn

== P ==
Giuseppe Parini (1729–1799)

- for Wolfgang Amadeus Mozart: Ascanio in Alba

Joseph Karl von Pauersbach

- for Joseph Haydn: Genovevens vierter Theil (lost)

Francesco Maria Piave (1810–1876)

- for Luigi Ricci and Federico Ricci: Crispino e la comare
- for Verdi: Aroldo (1857), Il corsaro (1848), I due Foscari (1844), Ernani (1844), La forza del destino (1862 first version), Macbeth (1847 first version), Macbeth (1865 second version), Rigoletto (1851), Simon Boccanegra (1857 first version), Stiffelio (1850), La traviata (1851)

Arthur Wing Pinero (1855–1934)

- for Arthur Sullivan: The Beauty Stone

Myfanwy Piper (1911–1997)

- for Benjamin Britten: Death in Venice, Owen Wingrave, The Turn of the Screw

James Robinson Planché (1796–1880)

- for Weber: Oberon

William Plomer (1903–1973)

- for Benjamin Britten: The Burning Fiery Furnace, Curlew River, Gloriana, The Prodigal Son.

Nunziato Porta

- for Joseph Haydn: Orlando paladino

David Pountney (born 1947)

- for Peter Maxwell Davies: The Doctor of Myddfai, Mr Emmet Takes a Walk

Alexander Preis

- for Shostakovich: Lady Macbeth of the Mtsensk district, The Nose

Sergei Prokofiev (1891–1953)

- for his own music:
  - alone: The Fiery Angel, The Gambler, The Love for Three Oranges, Maddalena
  - with Mira Mendelson: Betrothal in a Monastery, The Story of a Real Man, War and Peace
  - with Valentin Katayev: Semyon Kotko

Alexander Pushkin (1799–1837)

- used by Alexander Dargomyzhsky: The Stone Guest

Francesco Puttini

- for Joseph Haydn: La vera costanza

== Q ==
Philippe Quinault (1635–1688)

- for Jean-Baptiste Lully: Acis et Galatée, Amadis, Armide, Atys, Cadmus et Hermione, Isis, Persée, Phaëton, Proserpine, Roland, Thésée
- used by Gluck: Armide
- used by Piccinni: Roland

== R ==
Jean Richepin (1849–1926)

- for César Cui: Le flibustier
- for Jules Massenet: Le mage

Nikolai Rimsky-Korsakov (1844–1908)

- for his own music: Christmas Eve, Kashchey the Deathless, The Maid of Pskov, May Night, The Noblewoman Vera Sheloga, Sadko, Servilia, The Snow Maiden

Ottavio Rinuccini (1562–1621)

- for Caccini: Euridice
- for Gagliano: Dafne
- for Monteverdi: L'Arianna
- for Peri: Dafne, Euridice

Michael Symmons Roberts (born 1963)

- for James MacMillan: The Sacrifice

Paolo Antonio Rolli (1687–1765)

- for George Frideric Handel: Muzio Scevola, Floridante, Scipione, Alessandro, Riccardo Primo, Deidamia

Felice Romani (1788–1865)

- for Bellini: Beatrice di Tenda, I Capuleti e i Montecchi, Norma, Il pirata, La sonnambula, La straniera, Zaira
- for Donizetti: Alina, regina di Golconda, Anna Bolena, L'elisir d'amore, Gianni di Parigi, Lucrezia Borgia, Parisina, Rosmonda d'Inghilterra, Ugo, conte di Parigi
- for Giacomo Meyerbeer: L'esule di Granata, Margherita d'Anjou
- for Rossini: Aureliano in Palmira, Bianca e Falliero, Il turco in Italia
- for Verdi: Un giorno di regno

Giulio Rospigliosi (later Pope Clement IX) (1600–1669)

- for Stefano Landi: Il Sant'Alessio
- for Marco Marazzoli and Virgilio Mazzocchi: Chi soffre, speri
- for Luigi Rossi: Il palazzo incantato
- for Michelangelo Rossi: Erminia sul Giordano
- with Giacomo Rospigliosi
  - for Antonio Maria Abbatini and Marco Marazzoli: Dal male il bene

Gaetano Rossi (1774–1855)

- for Rossini: La cambiale di matrimonio, Tancredi, Semiramide
- for Simon Mayr: L'amor coniugale
- for Saverio Mercadante: Il giuramento
- for Meyerbeer: Il crociato in Egitto
- for Pacini: Carlo di Borgogna
- for Donizetti: Maria Padilla (with Gaetano Donizetti), Linda di Chamounix

Giacomo Rossi

- for George Frideric Handel: Rinaldo, Il pastor fido, Silla

Jean-Jacques Rousseau (1712–1778)

- for his own music: Le devin du village

Pierre-Charles Roy (1683–1764)

- for André Cardinal Destouches: Callirhoé
- for André Cardinal Destouches and Michel Richard Delalande: Les élémens

Alphonse Royer (1803–1875)

- with Gustave Vaëz
  - for Donizetti: La favorite, L'Ange de Nisida
  - for Rossini and Niedermeyer: Robert Bruce
  - for Verdi: Jérusalem

== S ==
Jules-Henri Vernoy de Saint-Georges (1799–1875)

- alone
  - for Franz Lachner: Caterina Cornaro
  - for Fromental Halévy: La reine de Chypre
- with Jules Adenis
  - for Bizet: La jolie fille de Perth
- with Jean-François Bayard:
  - for Donizetti: La fille du régiment
- with François-Antoine de Planard:
  - for Fromental Halévy: L'éclair
- with Eugène Scribe:
  - for Auber: Les diamants de la couronne

Johann Andreas Schachtner (1731–1795)

- for Mozart: Bastien und Bastienne (together with Friedrich Wilhelm Weiskern and Johann Heinrich Friedrich Müller), Zaide (incomplete)

Emanuel Schikaneder (1751–1812)

- for Mozart: The Magic Flute (1791)
- for Franz Xaver Süssmayr: Der Spiegel von Arkadien (1794)
- for Peter Winter: The Magic Flute's Second Part (1798)

Arnold Schoenberg (1874–1951)

- for his own music: Die glückliche Hand, Moses und Aron

Eugène Scribe (1791–1861)

- alone
  - for Auber: Le cheval de bronze, Le domino noir, L'enfant prodigue, Fra Diavolo, Gustave III, Haydée, Manon Lescaut, La muette de Portici, La part du diable
  - for Boieldieu: La dame blanche
  - for Donizetti: Dom Sébastien
  - for Halévy: Guido et Ginevra, La Juive
  - for Meyerbeer: L'Africaine, Les Huguenots, Le prophète, Robert le diable, L'étoile du nord
- with Germain Delavigne
  - for Gounod: La nonne sanglante
- with Charles-Gaspard Delestre-Poirson
  - for Rossini: Le comte Ory
- with Charles Duveyrier
  - for Donizetti: Le duc d'Albe
  - for Verdi: Les vêpres siciliennes
- with Jules-Henri Vernoy de Saint-Georges
  - for Auber: Les diamants de la couronne

Sandra Seaton

- for William Bolcom's From The Diary of Sally Hemings

Michel-Jean Sedaine (1719–1797)

- for Christoph Willibald Gluck: Le diable à quatre
- for André Grétry: Aucassin et Nicolette, Guillaume Tell, Richard Coeur-de-lion
- for Monsigny: Le déserteur

Peter Sellars (born 1957)

- for John Adams: Doctor Atomic

Elkanah Settle (1648–1724)

- for The World in the Moon (1697) and The Virgin Prophetess, or The Fate of Troy (1701)

Thomas Shadwell (c. 1642–1692)

- for Matthew Locke: Psyche

William Shakespeare (1564–1616)

- used by Benjamin Britten, heavily cut by Britten and Peter Pears: A Midsummer Night's Dream

Richard Brinsley Sheridan (1751–1816)

- for Thomas Linley the younger and Thomas Linley the elder: The Duenna

Renato Simoni (1875–1952)

- for Puccini: Turandot (with Giuseppe Adami)
- for Francesco Cilea: Il ritorno dell'amore

Montagu Slater (1902–1956)

- for Benjamin Britten: Peter Grimes

Temistocle Solera (1815–1878)

- for Verdi: Oberto, Conte di San Bonifacio, Nabucco, I Lombardi alla prima crociata, Giovanna d'Arco, Attila

Antonio Somma (1809–1864)

- for Verdi: Un ballo in maschera

Gertrude Stein (1874–1946)

- for Virgil Thomson: Four Saints in Three Acts, The Mother of Us All

Gottlieb Stephanie (1741–1800)

- for Mozart: Die Entführung aus dem Serail, Der Schauspieldirektor

B. C. Stephenson (1838–1906)

- for Arthur Sullivan: The Zoo
- for Frederic Clay: The Bold Recruit, Out of Sight, The Pirates Isle
- for Alfred Cellier: Charity Begins at Home, Doris, Dorothy, The Masque of Pandora

Cesare Sterbini (1784–1831)

- for Gioachino Rossini: The Barber of Seville, Torvaldo e Dorliska

Richard Strauss (1864–1949)

- for his own music: Guntram, Intermezzo, Salome (adapted from Oscar Wilde)

Igor Stravinsky (1882–1971)

- for his own music: Renard, Le rossignol

Alessandro Striggio (1573–1630)

- for Monteverdi: L'Orfeo

John Millington Synge (1871–1909)

- used by Ralph Vaughan Williams: Riders to the Sea

== T ==
Giovanni Targioni-Tozzetti (1863–1934)

- for Adriano Biagi: La sposa di Nino
- for Umberto Giordano: Regina Diaz
- for Pietro Mascagni: Amica, Cavalleria rusticana, Nerone, Pinotta, I Rantzau, Silvano, Zanetto

Nahum Tate (1652–1715)

- for Purcell: Dido and Aeneas

Modest Ilyich Tchaikovsky (1850–1916)

- for Eduard Nápravník: Dubrovsky
- for Sergei Rachmaninoff: Francesca da Rimini
- for Pyotr Ilyich Tchaikovsky: Iolanta, The Queen of Spades

Emmanuel Théaulon (1787–1841)

- with de Rancé
  - for Luigi Cherubini: Blanche de Provence
  - for Ferdinando Paer: Blanche de Provence
  - for Franz Liszt: Don Sanche

Michael Tippett (1905–1998)

- for his own music: The Ice Break, King Priam, The Knot Garden, The Midsummer Marriage, New Year

Andrea Leone Tottola (?–1831)

- for Bellini: Adelson e Salvini
- for Donizetti: Alfredo il grande, Il castello di Kenilworth, Gabriella di Vergy, Imelda de' Lambertazzi, La zingara
- for Giovanni Pacini: Alessandro nelle Indie
- for Rossini: La donna del lago, Ermione, Mosè in Egitto, Zelmira

Étienne Tréfeu (1821–1903)

- with Adolphe Jaime and Hector-Jonathan Crémieux
  - for Offenbach: Geneviève de Brabant

== V ==
Albert Vanloo (1846–1920)

- for Edmond Audran

- with William Busnach: L'oeuf rouge

- for Emmanuel Chabrier

- with Eugène Letterier: L'étoile, Une éducation manquée

- for Alexandre Charles Lecocq

- with William Busnach: Ali-Baba
- with Georges Duval: La belle au bois dormant
- with Eugène Letterier: La Camargo, Giroflé-Girofla, La jolie persane, Le jour et la nuit, La marjolaine, La petite mariée

- for André Messager

- with Georges Duval: Les dragons de l'impératrice, Les p'tites Michu, Véronique

- for Offenbach

- with Eugène Letterier: Mam'zelle Moucheron
- with Leterrier and A Mortier: Le voyage dans la lune

Giambattista Varesco (1735–1805)

- for Mozart: Idomeneo, L'oca del Cairo (incomplete)

Ralph Vaughan Williams (1872–1958)

- for his own music: The Pilgrim's Progress, Sir John in Love

Royce Vavrek

- for Du Yun: Angel's Bone
- for Ricky Ian Gordon: 27
- for David T. Little: JFK, Dog Days, Vinkensport, or The Finch Opera
- for Missy Mazzoli: Breaking the Waves

- with the composer: Song from the Uproar: The Lives and Deaths of Isabelle Eberhardt

- for Gregory Spears: O Columbia

Paul Verlaine

- for Emmanuel Chabrier: Fisch-Ton-Kan

Jules-Henri Vernoy de Saint-Georges (1799–1875) – see above under S

Voltaire (1694–1778)

- for Rameau: La princesse de Navarre, Le temple de la gloire, Les fêtes de Ramire, Samson (lost)

== W ==
Richard Wagner (1813–1883)

- for his own music: Die Feen, The Flying Dutchman, Götterdämmerung, Die Hochzeit, Das Liebesverbot, Lohengrin, Die Meistersinger von Nürnberg, Parsifal, Das Rheingold, Rienzi, Der Ring des Nibelungen, Siegfried, Tannhäuser, Tristan und Isolde, Die Walküre

Camillo Walzel (1829–1895) pseudonym F Zell

- with Richard Genée
- for Carl Millöcker: Der Bettelstudent
- for Johann Strauss II: Cagliostro in Wien, Der lustige Krieg, Eine Nacht in Venedig

Ignatz Anton von Weiser (1701-1785)

- for Mozart: Die Schuldigkeit des ersten Gebots (first part)

Friedrich Wilhelm Weiskern (1711–1768)

- for Mozart: Bastien und Bastienne (together with Johann Heinrich Friedrich Müller and Johann Andreas Schachtner)

Rufinus Widl (1731-1798)

- for Mozart: Apollo et Hyacinthus

Thornton Wilder (1897–1975)

- for Paul Hindemith: The Long Christmas Dinner

Albert Willemetz (1887–1964)

- for Arthur Honegger: Les aventures du roi Pausole
- for Henri Christiné: Phi-Phi
- for André Messager: Coups de roulis
- for Maurice Yvain: Ta bouche, Là-Haut, Yes !

Ernst von Wolzogen (1855–1934)

- for Richard Strauss: Feuersnot

== Y ==
Arthur Yorinks (born 1953)

- for Philip Glass: The Fall of the House of Usher, The Juniper Tree

== Z ==
Carlo Zangarini (1873–1943)

- for Giacomo Puccini: La fanciulla del West (with Guelfo Civinini)

Franco Zeffirelli (1923–2019)

- for Samuel Barber: Antony and Cleopatra

Alexander von Zemlinsky (1871–1942)

- for his own music: Der König Kandaules

Apostolo Zeno (1668–1750)

- used by Handel: Faramondo
- used by Hasse: Antioco
- used by Hasse and Holzbauer: Lucio Papirio
- used by Holzbauer: Il Don Chisciotte, Sesostri, re d'Egitto, Vologeso
- used by Alessandro Scarlatti and Antonio Vivaldi: Griselda

Julius Zeyer (1841–1901)

- for Leoš Janáček: Šárka

Bernd Alois Zimmermann (1918–1970)

- for his own music: Die Soldaten

Peter Zinovieff

- for Harrison Birtwistle: The Mask of Orpheus

Émile Zola (1840–1902)

- for Alfred Bruneau: Messidor, L'ouragan

Stefan Zweig (1881–1942)

- for Richard Strauss: Die schweigsame Frau

== General sources ==
- The New Grove Dictionary of Opera, ed. Stanley Sadie (London, 1992) ISBN 0-333-73432-7
- The Oxford Dictionary of Opera, by John Warrack and Ewan West (1992), 782 pages, ISBN 0-19-869164-5
- Kenyon, Nicholas; Walsh, Stephen (1993). Holden, Amanda (ed.). The Viking Opera Guide. London: Viking. ISBN 0-670-81292-7.

== See also ==
- Literaturoper
