= Burletta =

Brief comic opera

In theater and music history, a burletta (Italian, meaning "little joke", sometimes burla or burlettina) is a brief comic opera. In eighteenth-century Italy, a burletta was the comic intermezzo between the acts of an opera seria. The extended work Pergolesi's La serva padrona was also designated a "burletta" at its London premiere in 1758.

In England, the term began to be used, in contrast to burlesque, for works that satirized opera but did not employ musical parody. Burlettas in English began to appear in the 1760s, the earliest identified as such being Midas by Kane O'Hara, first performed privately in 1760 near Belfast, and produced at Covent Garden in 1764. The form became debased when the term burletta began to be used for English comic or ballad operas, as a way of evading the monopoly on "legitimate drama" in London belonging to Covent Garden and Drury Lane. After the passage of the Theatres Act 1843, which repealed crucial regulations of the Licensing Act 1737, use of the term declined.

== List of theatrical Burlettas ==
- Midas by Kane O'Hara (Belfast, 1760, Dublin, 1762)
- Orpheus by François-Hippolyte Barthélémon (London, 1767)
- The Judgement of Paris by Barthélémon (London, 1768)
- The Recruiting Serjeant by Charles Dibdin (London, 1770)
- The Portrait by Samuel Arnold (1770)
- The Portrait by Barthélémon (Dublin, c. 1771)
- L'infedeltà delusa by Joseph Haydn (1773)
- The Golden Pippin by John Abraham Fisher (1773)
- Buxom Joan by Raynor Taylor (1778)
- Poor Vulcan by Dibdin (1778)
- Marie Tanner, words by Broughton Black and Poland Henry, music by John Ivimey (produced at Cardiff, 1897)
- Tom and Jerry, or Life in London by W. T. Moncrieff (1821)

== Other Meanings ==
The word burletta has also been used for scherzo-like instrumental music by composers including Max Reger and Bartók. In America, the word has sometimes been used as an alternative for burlesque.
