= Gustav Philipp Zwinger =

German painter (1779–1819)

Gustav Philipp Zwinger (3 January 1779 – 15 January 1819), painter and printmaker, was born at Nuremberg. He was the son and pupil of the painter and engraver Sigmund Zwinger (1744–1813), now chiefly remembered as a teacher. Gustav completed his studies under Heinrich Füger in Vienna, and returning to his native town, became in turn professor and director of the Art School. He was also known as an historical painter, both in oil and watercolour, and as a designer of book illustrations. He etched a few plates and tried his hand at lithography. He died at Nuremberg.
