= Le jugement de Midas =

French comédie mêlée d'ariettes (a kind of opéra comique)

Depiction of the character of Lise

Le Jugement de Midas (The Judgement of Midas) is a French comédie mêlée d'ariettes (a kind of opéra comique), in three acts by André Grétry dedicated to Madame de Montesson. It was first performed, with amateur singers, on 28 March 1778 in the private little theatre set up by Madame de Montesson in the apartments of her secret husband Louis Philippe, Duke of Orléans, at the Palais-Royal in Paris. The libretto is by the Irish playwright Thomas Hales (also known by the French name Thomas d'Hèle) with additional contributions by Louis Anseaume. It was based on the burlesque opera Midas (1760) by Kane O'Hara. The public premiere at the Comédie-Italienne took place on 27 June 1778.

== Roles ==
The original amateur cast of the private premiere at Madame de Montesson's is not known.

Role	Voice type	Public Premiere Cast, 27 June 1778 (Conductor: - )
Apollon	haute-contre	Jean-Baptiste Guignard, called Clairval
Mercure	basse-taille (bass-baritone)	Philippe-Thomas Ménier (also spelt Meunier)
Midas	taille (baritenor)	Jean-René Lecoupay de la Rosière
Palémon	basse-taille	M Nainville
Mopsa	soprano	Louise-Frédérique Moulinghen, née Schrœder
Lise	soprano	Catherine-Ursule Billion, née Bussa(rt), called Mlle Billioni
Chloé	soprano	Louise-Rosalie Gourgaud, née Lefebvre, called Mme Dugazon
Pan	basse-taille	Pierre-Marie Narbonne
Marsias	haute-contre	Antoine Trial

== Synopsis ==
=== Act 1 ===
The overture depicts a storm during which Jupiter hurls Apollo from heaven as punishment for mocking him. Apollo disguises himself as a shepherd under the name "Alexis". His singing attracts the attention of the farmer Palemon. Palemon is a music lover and offers Apollo a job. He explains that the local bailli (magistrate) Midas has arranged marriages between Palémon's daughters Lise and Chloé and two other musical talents from the village, Pan and Marsias. Apollo is appalled at the quality of their singing. Paleon's wife Mopsa reproaches him for taking in a stranger, "Alexis", without knowing anything of his background.

=== Act 2 ===
Lise and Chloé discuss the attractions of the newcomer. Apollo also manages to charm Mopsa and begins to court both daughters. Soon Palémon and Mopsa are persuaded that he would make a better son-in-law than Pan or Marsias and they plot to get rid of them.

=== Act 3 ===
Midas is annoyed at the turn of events. He decrees that the choice of husbands will be decided by a singing contest. He completely rejects Apollo's new style of music, preferring Marsias's piece in the style of old-fashioned French Baroque opera and Pan's in the style of popular vaudevilles. Apollo responds with an allegorical song describing a competition between a nightingale, owl and cuckoo judged by a donkey. Midas is outraged at the insinuation and banishes him but Apollo punishes Midas by giving him donkey's ears. The god then reveals his true identity. Mercury descends from heaven to announce Jupiter has forgiven Apollo, who sets off for Parnassus with both daughters in tow.

== Recordings ==
- Le Jugement de Midas: John Elwes, Mieke van der Sluis, Jules Bastin, La Petite Bande, conducted by Gustav Leonhardt (Ricercar, 1989)
- Le Jugement de Midas: Louis Devos, Jean-Jacques Schreurs, Bernadette Degelin, Loretta Clini, Chris de Moor, La Formation de Chambre du Nouvel Orchestre Symphonique de la RTBF, conducted by Ronald Zollman (Koch Schwann 3-1090-2) (extracts)

== Sources ==
- Public premiere libretto: Le jugement de Midas : comédie en trois actes; en prose mêlée d'ariettes; représentée pour la premiere fois par les Comédiens Italiens ordinaires du Roi, le Samedi 27 Juin 1778, Paris Duchesne, 1778 (accessible online at Library of Congress)
- Bartlet, M Elizabeth C (1992), "Grétry, André-Ernest-Modeste", (work-list) in The New Grove Dictionary of Opera, ed. Stanley Sadie (London) ISBN 0-333-73432-7
- Michel Brenet Grétry: sa vie et ses œuvres (F. Hayez, 1884)
- David Charlton Grétry and the Growth of Opéra Comique (Cambridge University Press, 1986)
- Ronald Lessens Grétry ou Le triomphe de l'Opéra-Comique (L'Harmattan, 2007)
