= Heinrich Füger =

German painter (1751–1818)

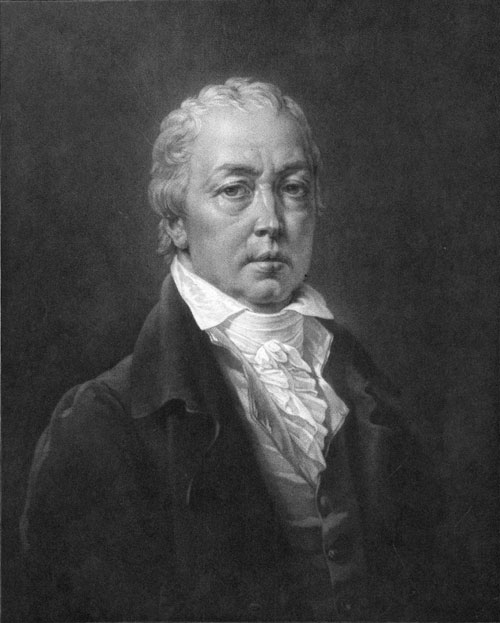
- Mezzotint by Vinzenz Georg Kininger after a self-portrait (c.1818)
- Born: Heinrich Füger; 8 December 1751; Heilbronn, Duchy of Württemberg, Holy Roman Empire
- Died: 5 November 1818 (aged 66); Vienna, Austrian Empire
- Occupation: Historical painter

Heinrich Friedrich Füger (8 December 1751 – 5 November 1818) was a German portrait and historical painter and one of the most important German representatives of classicism.

== Biography ==
Füger was born in Heilbronn. He was the son of Joseph Gabriel Füger, a Pietist pastor and later the highest-ranking clergyman in Heilbronn (senior member of the Protestant Ministry in Heilbronn). Füger began his training as a painter in 1764 with court painter Nicolas Guibal at the Hohe Karlsschule in Stuttgart. From 1769, he continued his studies in Leipzig with Johann Wolfgang Goethe's drawing teacher Adam Friedrich Oeser. He then undertook a study trip to Italy. In 1774, he moved to Vienna. The English ambassador to the Viennese court, Robert Murray Keith (British Army officer), became his patron and supporter. Through him, he came into contact with the imperial family. From then on, his further education and career were promoted by the highest political authorities. In the fall of 1776, he received a scholarship for a study visit to Rome lasting several years. His further artistic development was strongly influenced by Anton Raphael Mengs. From 1781 to 1783, he worked for the imperial family in the vicinity of Naples, where he painted frescoes in the Palazzo Caserta. In 1783, State Chancellor Wenzel Anton, Prince of Kaunitz-Rietberg appointed him deputy director of the Vienna Academy, then one of Europe's leading art academies. From 1791 until the death of his wife in 1807, Füger was married to the actress Anna Josefa Hortensia Müller, daughter of Johann Heinrich Friedrich Müller. In 1795, Füger became director of the academy, which flourished under his leadership. In 1806, he became director of the imperial picture gallery and castle captain at Belvedere Palace.

== Work ==
Füger worked as a fresco painter for the royal palace in Palazzo Caserta near Naples, as an illustrator for Klopstock's religious epic Messiah, and also as a portrait miniaturist and history painter. Among Füger's earliest illustrations are those created with the Leipzig engraver Christian Gottlieb Geyser for Laurence Sterne's Yoricks empfindsame Reise durch Frankreich und Italien, translated by Johann Joachim Christoph Bode and published in Hamburg in 1768. Building on the knowledge he had acquired at the French Academy and from the paintings of Jacques Louis David, whom he had met in Rome, the artist attempted to introduce the classicist style to Vienna. With the help of Sir Murray Keith and Guibal, Füger came into contact with a network of influential figures in Vienna, including Prince Kaunitz, who would henceforth be his patron. During their stay in Rome in 1776, the scholarship holders had to follow tasks that had been formulated according to the ideas of Johann Joachim Winckelmann, including studying the works of Raphael, Annibale Carracci, and Domenichino. Equally important were the works of Nicolas Poussin and Le Sueur, which Füger was also able to see in Rome. It was probably the excavations in Herculaneum and Pompeii, which Füger was one of the few artists invited by the imperial envoy to the Neapolitan court to visit in 1781, that had a particular influence on his classicist approach, as he immediately incorporated the theme of excavation into his depictions for the library in the Palace of Caserta. Naples was also the location where other ancient sculptures that had been excavated earlier could be seen, such as the Farnese Hercules.

Among his historical paintings are The Farewell of Coriolanus (Czernin Gallery, Vienna), Allegory on the Peace of Vienna (1801), The Death of Germanicus (1789), The Assassination of Caesar, and Bathsheba (Budapest Gallery). Among his portraits are those of the Emperor Joseph II, the Grand Duchess Elizabeth Wilhelmine of Württemberg, Wolfgang Amadeus Mozart, Queen Caroline of Naples, and Horatio Nelson, who sat for him in Vienna in 1800 (National Portrait Gallery, London). He painted in the classic style of Louis David and Anton Raphael Mengs and was inclined to be theatrical.

Füger was also a teacher; among his pupils were Gustav Philipp Zwinger, and Franciszek Ksawery Lampi. He died in Vienna.

== Selected paintings ==
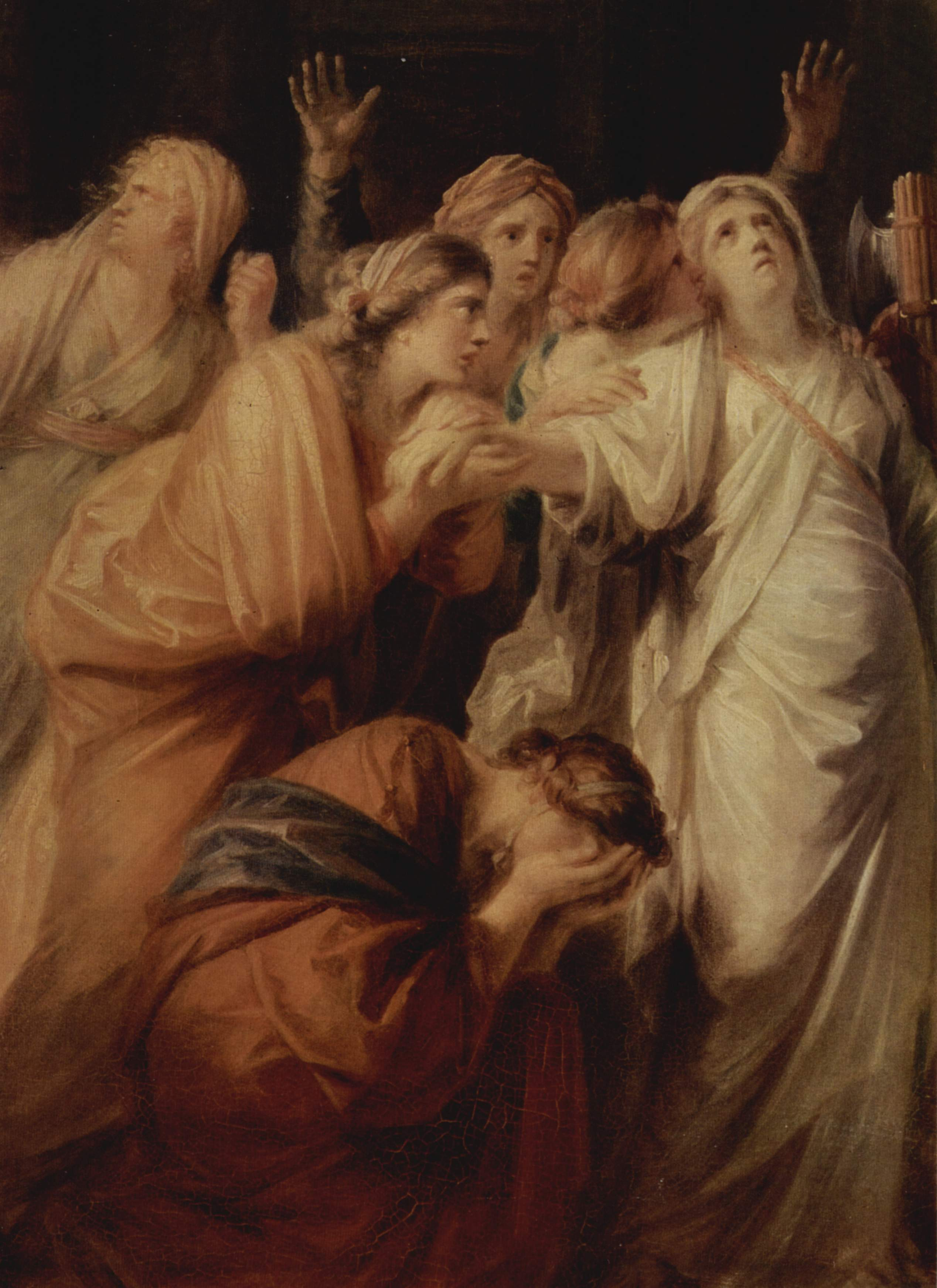
Execution of a Vestal Virgin, Detail

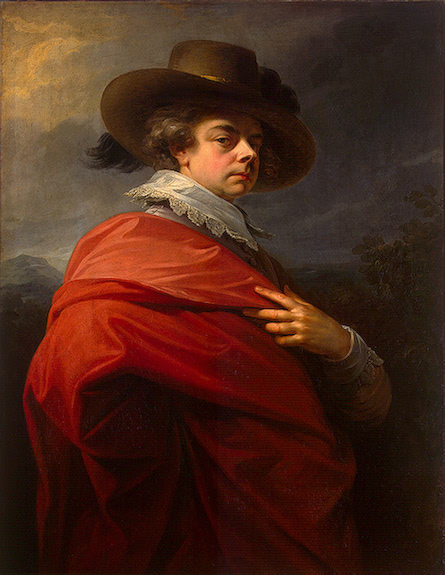
Portrait of Prince Nikolay Yusupov, Detail

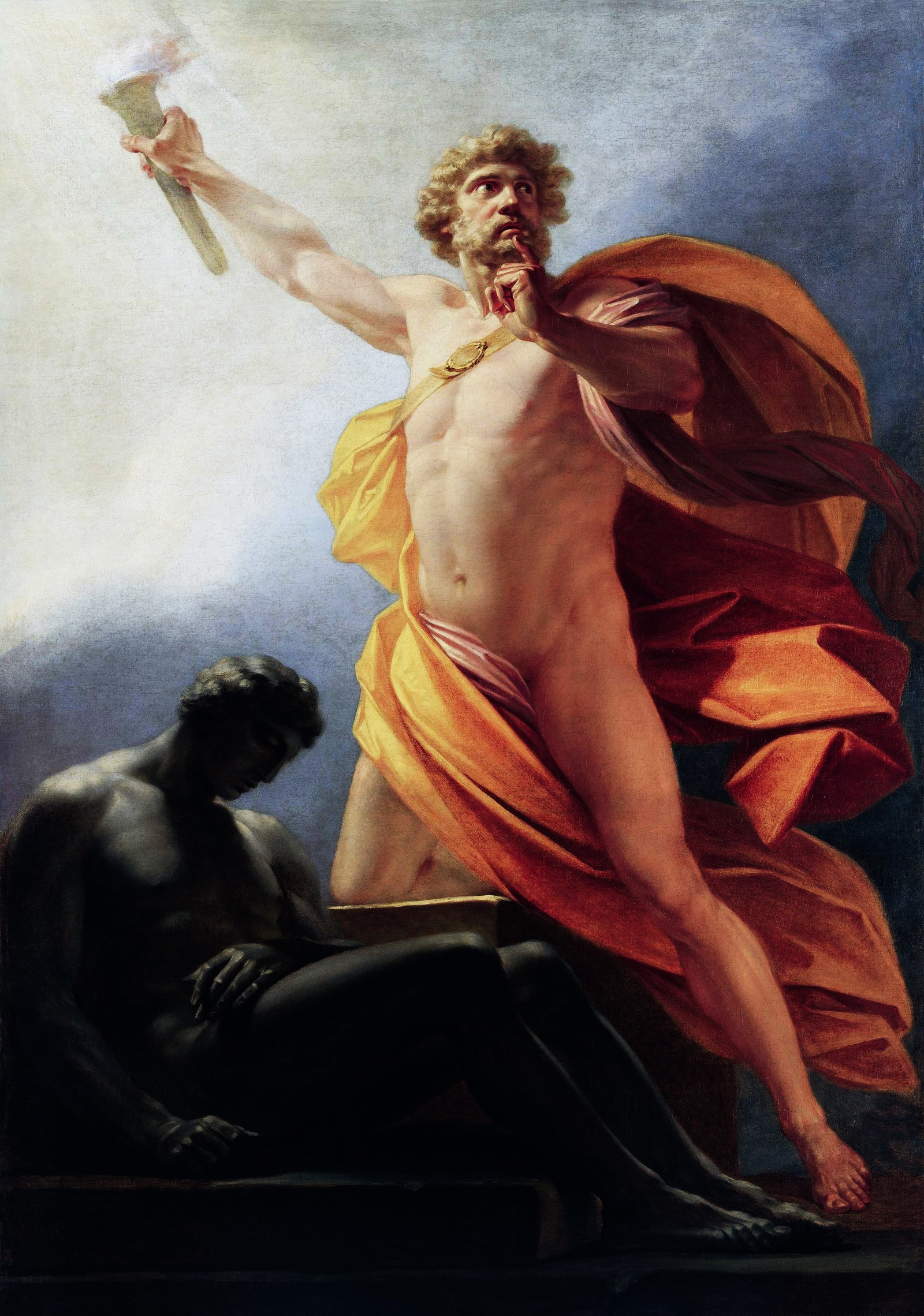
Prometheus Brings Fire to Mankind

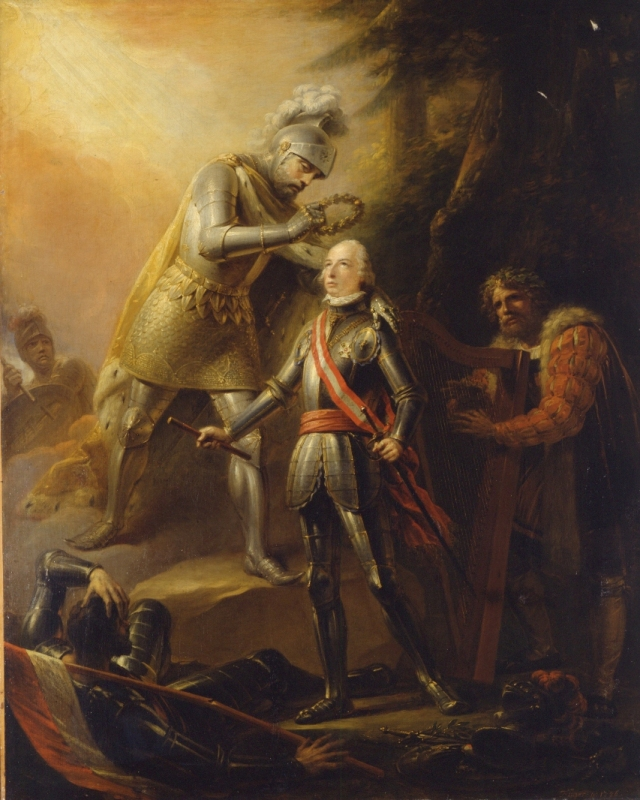
Apotheosis of Archduke Charles, Duke of Teschen

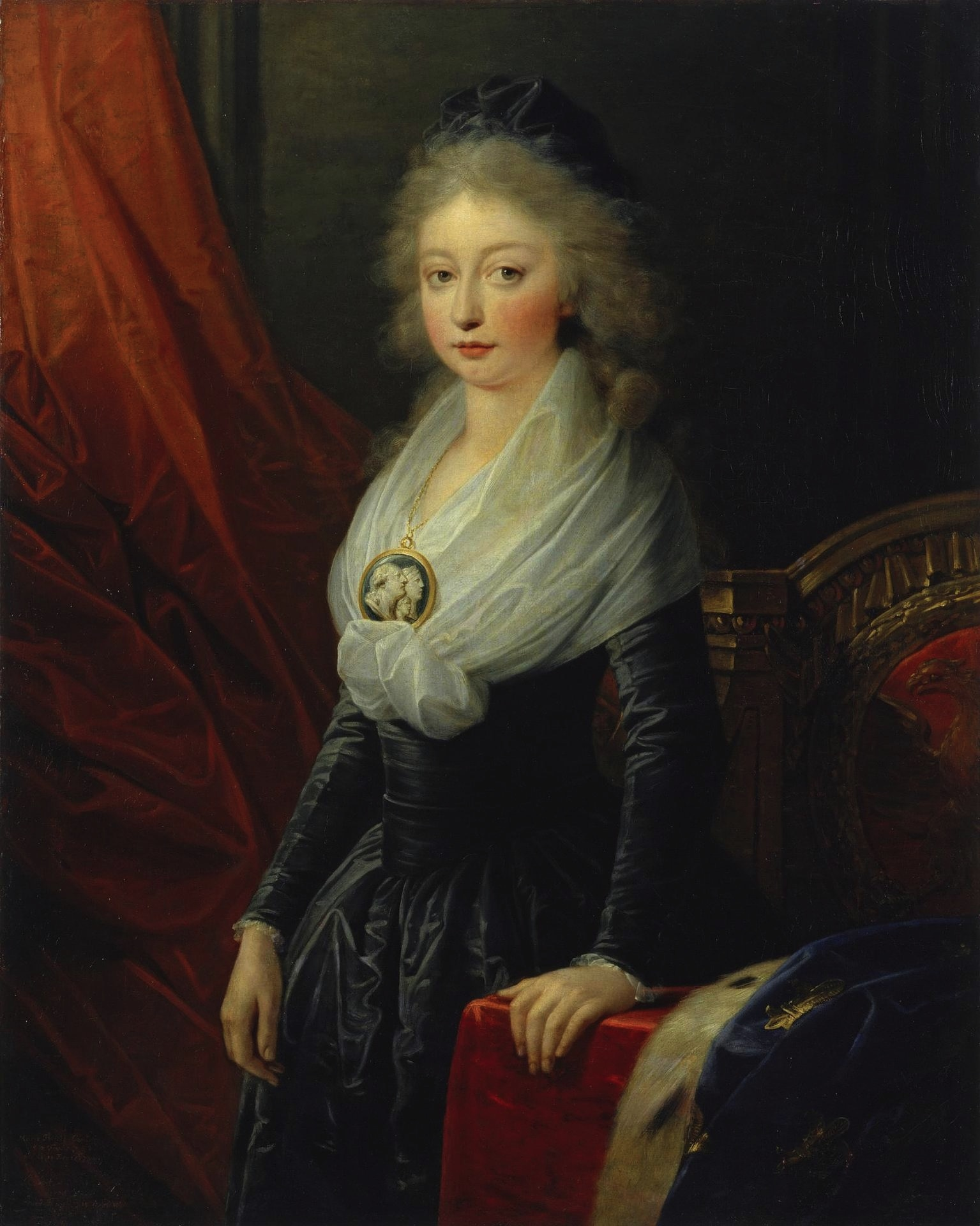
Portrait of Marie Thérèse of France

== See also ==
- List of German painters
