= The Assassination of Caesar =

Painting by Heinrich Füger

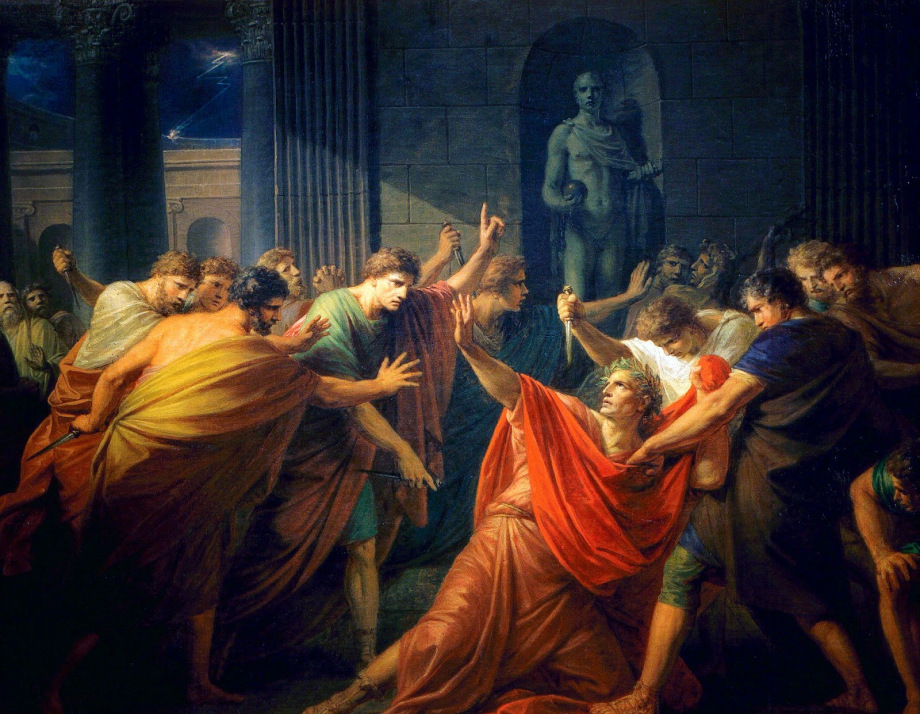
- Artist: Heinrich Friedrich Füger
- Year: 1818
- Medium: oil on canvas
- Dimensions: 155 cm × 221 cm (61 in × 87 in)
- Location: Vienna Museum, Vienna

The Assassination of Caesar is an oil on canvas painting by German artist Heinrich Füger, created in 1818, which depicts the assassination of Julius Caesar. It is held at the Vienna Museum.

== Description ==
The central figure of the work is Julius Caesar who is about to be stabbed by his friend Brutus, in the historical event that took place during the Ides of March, on 44 BC.

== Reception ==
Mitchell Benjamin Frank stated that with "The Assassination of Caesar Füger works in a baroque style that blurs contour and uses a rich blending of colour" which contrasts with his contemporary Franz Pforr.
