= Thomas Hales (dramatist) =

British-born French dramatist and librettist

Thomas Hales (c. 1740 – 27 December 1780) was a British-born French dramatist and librettist. He was from an Irish expatriate family in Gloucestershire and joined the Royal Navy during the Seven Years' War. He settled in Jamaica for a short time and then in Havana, Cuba, before moving to Europe to travel. He lived in Switzerland and Italy both before arriving in Paris, France, in 1770, where he was bankrupted (reportedly by pursuit of women and drunkenness).

He learned French quickly and became thoroughly fluent. He met the composer Grétry in 1775 and began to work with him as a librettist. Their first collaboration was Les fausses apparences, ou, L'amant jaloux. The opera was a hit, and Hales would write four more plays/librettos in the coming years. In 1777 he wrote a short fiction entitled Le roman de mon oncle. In 1778, he worked with Gréty on Le jugement de Midas, which was based on Midas by the Irish playwright Kane O'Hara (1762). The same year, the two produced Les fausses apparences as a comic opera. The play was partially based on Susanna Centlivre's The Wonder: a Woman Keeps a Secret of 1714. The third opera was Les evénements imprévus in 1779, which was inspired by an unknown Italian original. It would inspire George Colman the Younger's Gay Deceivers of 1804. Finally, in prose, Hales wrote Gilles ravisseur (published in 1781).

Hales died of a chest infection in Paris. His mistress, Madame Bianchi, an Italian actress, had left him to return to Italy, and he apparently suffered complications from a military injury.
