= Ela Q. May =

British child actress (born c.1890)

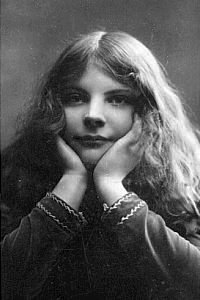
Ela Q. May as Liza in the original production of Peter Pan

Ela Queenie May (born c. 1890) was a child actress of the Edwardian era. She is probably best remembered as Liza, the Darling family servant, in the original production of Peter Pan (1904–1906) and later played Wendy Darling in the touring companies of Peter Pan (1906–1908). Before that, she played roles at several West End theatres from 1900, including the title role in Ib and Little Christina in 1901 and again in 1904.

== Earliest roles ==
May was variously known as Elie, Elie Queenie, and Queenie.

She made her début in London’s Garrick Theatre playing a bridesmaid in J. M. Barrie’s The Wedding Guest (September 1900 – January 1901). She made further short appearances at the Royal Court Theatre and the Princess's Theatre before she was engaged by the D'Oyly Carte Opera Company to appear as Little Christina in a revival of Ib and Little Christina at the Savoy Theatre, where it had a brief run of 16 performances (November 14–29, 1901).

Isabel Jay, Robert Evett and Ela Q. May in Ib and Little Christina, 1901

She soon appeared as Sandro in Louis N. Parker’s The Twin Sister at the Duke of York's Theatre. In 1902 she was back at the Savoy as Second Royal Page in Basil Hood and Edward German’s opera Merrie England, at the same time playing Norah in Aimée Daniell Beringer’s one-act play Holly Tree Inn at Terry's Theatre (April–May 1902).

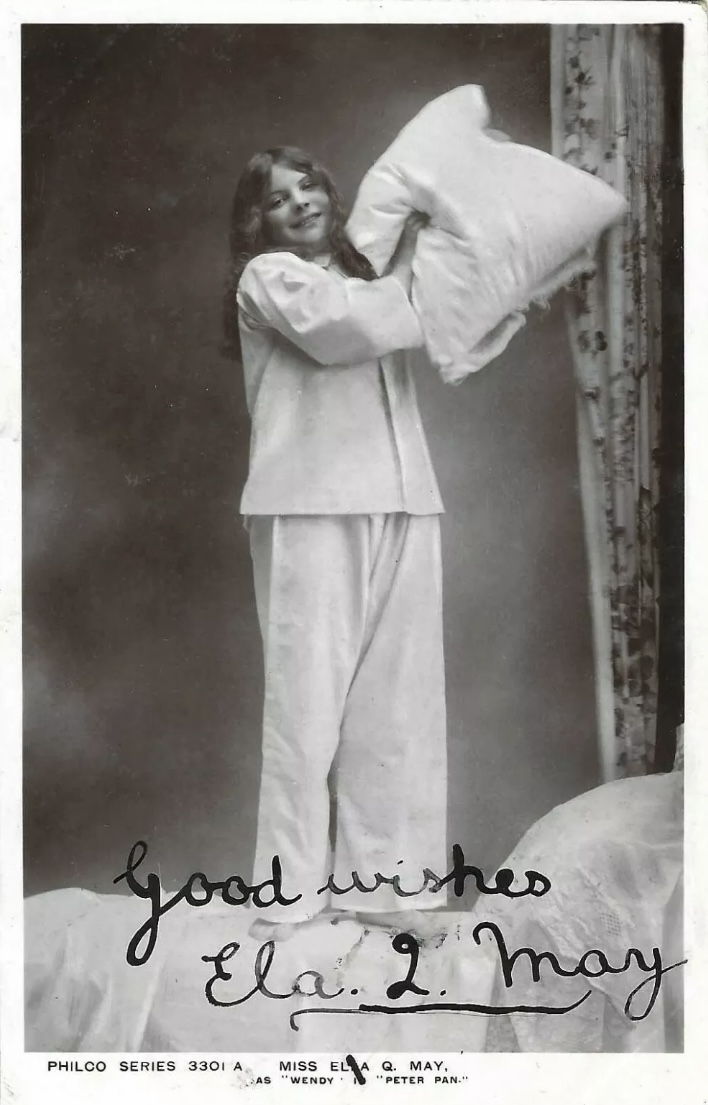
May as Wendy in the touring production of Peter Pan, 1906

May went on to play in children's roles in The Exile by Lloyd Osbourne and Austin Strong and starring John Martin-Harvey as the exiled Emperor Napoleon at the Royalty Theatre (May 1903), Rumplestiltzkin in a single matinée performance at the Adelphi Theatre (May 1903), and reprised her role of Little Christina in Ib and Little Christina at Daly's Theatre and the Lyric Theatre (January–March 1904).

== Peter Pan and last roles ==
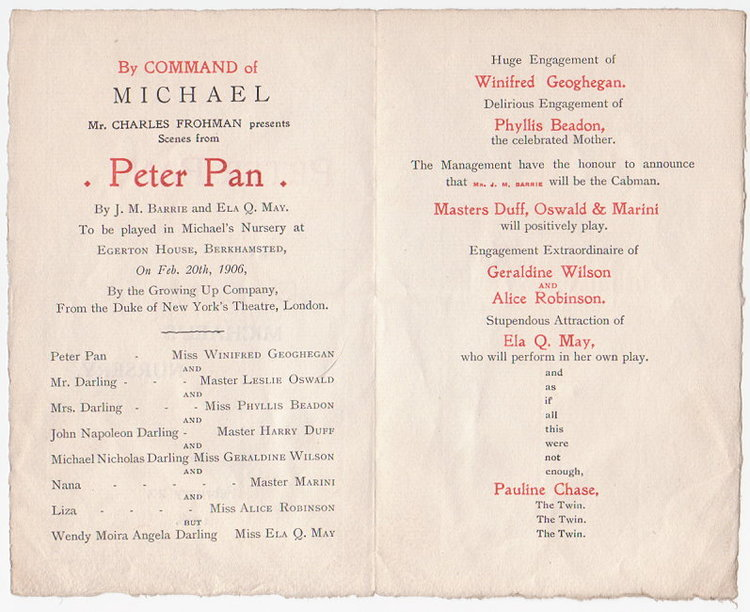
May was jokingly billed as co-author of Peter Pan in a private performance, 1906

She played the Darling family's house servant Liza (credited humorously in the programme as the "author of the play") in the world premiere of Peter Pan at the Duke of York's Theatre (December 1904 – April 1905, and again in December 1905 – February 1906). When the audience called for the author it was May who walked onto the stage to inform them that her friend Mr Barrie "was not in the house." In April 1905 she played Child opposite Ellen Terry as Alice Grey and Irene Vanbrugh as Amy Grey in Barrie’s Alice Sit-by-the-Fire at the Duke of York’s, and then was Child in Barrie’s curtain raiser Pantaloon with Gerald du Maurier in the title role at the Duke of York's (April–July 1905).

In February 1906 she was again jokingly credited with Barrie as the co-author of the play when Barrie and producer Charles Frohman brought scenery and an all-child cast from the London theatre production for a special performance of Peter Pan for an unwell Michael Llewelyn Davies (with his brothers the inspiration for Barrie's characters Peter Pan, the Darling brothers, and the Lost Boys) in 'Michael’s Nursery' at Egerton House in Berkhamsted, the family home of the Llewelyn Davies family. For this special one-off performance she played Wendy Darling, while Barrie himself appeared as the Cabman. She played Wendy in the 1906–07 second touring company of Peter Pan opposite Zena Dare in the title role, and again with the only touring company (1907–08), when the critic of the Bath Chronicle described her as "a charming and delightful Wendy".
