= Ernest Hilbert =

American composer and writer (born 1970)

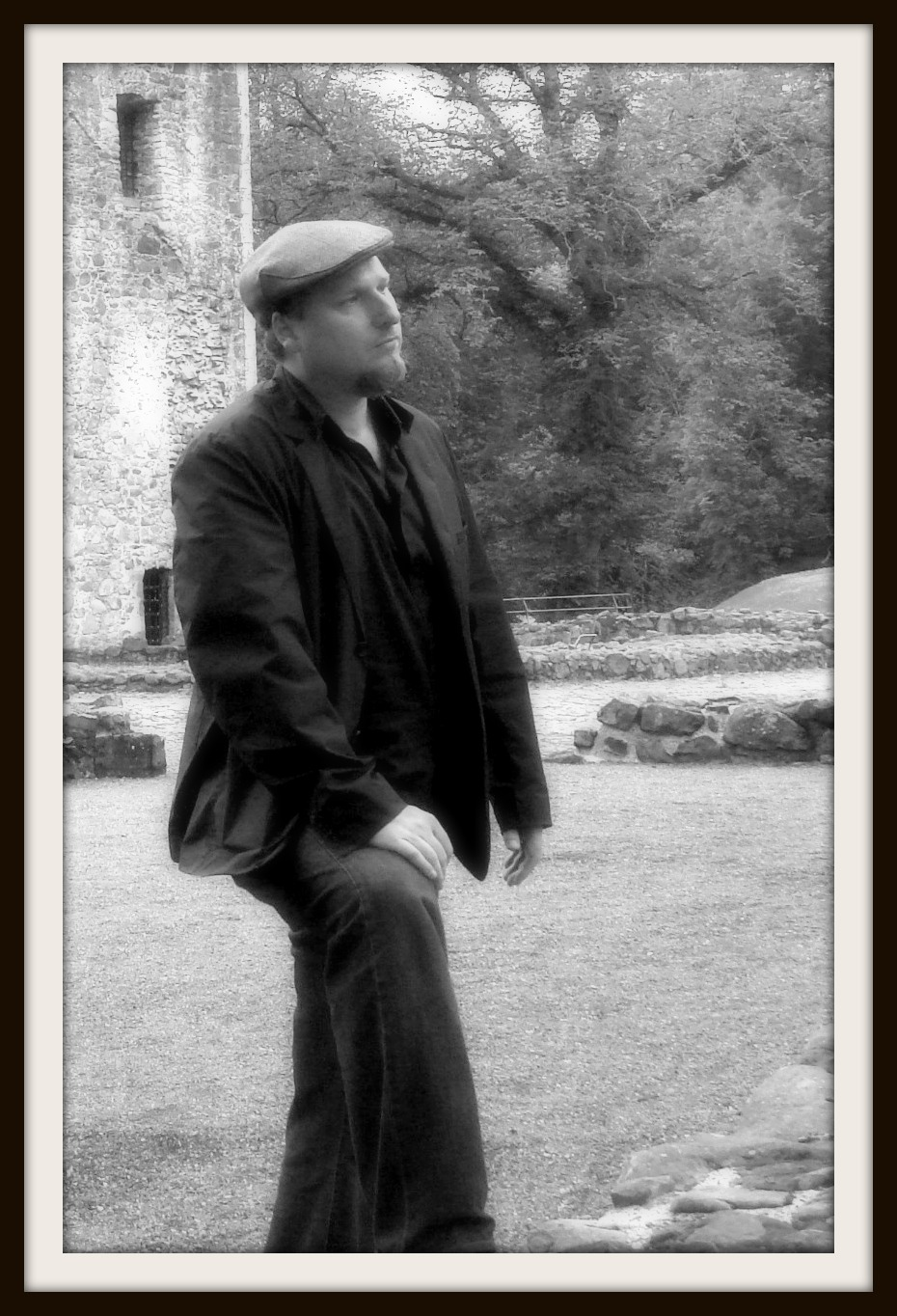
- Ernest Hilbert in 2011
- Born: 1970 (age 55–56); Philadelphia, Pennsylvania, US
- Occupations: Poet, Critic, Editor, Opera Librettist

Ernest Hilbert (born 1970) is an American poet, critic, opera librettist, and editor.

== Biography ==
Ernest Hilbert was born in Philadelphia, Pennsylvania, United States, and grew up in South Jersey. He graduated summa cum laude with a bachelor's degree in English literature from Rutgers University in 1993. He also received a Master's Degree (1994) and Doctorate (2000) in English Literature from St Catherine's College, Oxford. His doctoral dissertation was entitled "Dark Earth, Dark Heavens: British Apocalyptic Writing in the First World War and its Aftermath." While a student there, he founded the short-lived magazine Oxford Quarterly (1995–1997). After moving from Oxford to Manhattan, he worked as an editor for the punk and beatnik magazine Long Shot for one year, before serving as the poetry editor for Random House's online magazine Bold Type for several years (2000–2004) and also edited the print and online magazine nowCulture (2000–2005). From 2005-2010 he edited the Contemporary Poetry Review.

Hilbert has worked as an antiquarian and first edition bookseller at Bauman Rare Books, in the art-deco Sun Oil Building in Philadelphia, since 2003. Between 2012 and 2019, Hilbert taught at the World of Versecraft, the low residency Master of Fine Arts program in poetry at Western State University of Colorado. His classes included an intensive summer course on the practical art of the opera libretto, as well as courses during the year on the verse satire, dramatic poetry, history of the English language, studies in translation, and historical foundations of English prosody.

Hilbert writes about books for The Washington Post, The Wall Street Journal, and The Hopkins Review. On January 13, 2017, Hilbert started a Dark Web poetry magazine called Cocytus.

== Poetry ==
=== Sonnets ===
In recent years Hilbert has composed in his own sonnet form described by Daniel Nester as the "Hilbertian" sonnet. Critic Christopher Bernard refers to them as "loosely formed sonnets, a form that Hilbert has made his own, proving this most classic of forms can contain anything the 21st century can throw at it." In his "Brief Introduction to Versification," which appears as an appendix to The Fortunes of Poetry in an Age of Unmaking, professor James Matthew Wilson describes the Hilbertian sonnet as "a nonce form of the sonnet" with the rhyme scheme ABCABC DEFDEF GG. "While unmetered or only loosely metered, Hilbert's sonnets observe the boundaries of the little room of the sonnet marked by the rhyme scheme quite carefully." Critic Maryann Corbett has written in Rattle that "Hilbert has made the limits tight in a new way. He's created his own Houdini-like set of chains to wriggle out of: a new form that's already known as the Hilbertian sonnet, with the rhyme scheme ABC ABC DEF DEF GG. It's a form designed to grate against the expectations of the reader who is geared to the usual foursquare quatrains in the octaves of the Petrarchan and Shakespearian sonnet forms." Critic and classical scholar Chris Childers wrote in The Hopkins Review that "the structural units of Hilbert's sonnets fall outside the usual parameters of octave-sestet... allowing Hilbert to put the conventional volta (or turn) anywhere or nowhere. The effect is to de-formulaicize and de-familiarize the sonnet’s traditional rhetorical shape, shifting the weight of emphasis off of argument and onto imagery and voice, an effect to which the distant mutedness of the rhymes also contributes."

Several of his sonnets and other poems have been featured by David Lehman on the Best American Poetry website. His poem "Ashore," which appeared in the Yale Review early in 2009, was reprinted by the Academy of American Poets for their August 2009 "Shark Week" feature. "Domestic Situation," "AAA Vacation Guide," and "Prophetic Outlook" are reprinted by the Poetry Foundation.

Hilbert's unpublished collection Cathedral Building, which combines a wide variety of styles and poetic approaches, has been a finalist for the Colorado Prize for Poetry (under the title Removal of the Body), the Barrow Street Press Book Contest, the Yale Younger Poets Prize, and the Walt Whitman Award from the Academy of American Poets. It also received an honorable mention for the Dorset Prize.

Hilbert's poems have been published in literary journals including The American Poetry Review, The Yale Review, Boston Review, The American Scholar, The New Republic, The Hudson Review, Harvard Review, Parnassus, and The New Criterion.

=== Translations ===
In 2009, the Tollund Group, a Nordic translation firm, sponsored its first annual poetry translation prize. Two translations of Hilbert's poems were awarded cash prizes. The winner of the best Danish translation was Mette Bollerup Doyle, who translated Hilbert's "Outsider Art" ("Outsiderens kunst"). The winner for Norwegian translation was Marit Ombudstvedt of Vestby in Norway, who translated "Love Songs" (Kjærlighetssanger"). The judges failed to select a winner in the category of Swedish language. In 2010, four of Hilbert's poems, "City-Scape Gentlemen’s Club, Queens," "Sunrise with Sea Monsters," "Rakewell in TriBeCa," "Dusk in a Crowded Train Compartment, Regretting My Life," were translated into Czech and appeared in the magazine Souvislosti. Hilbert's poem "Nights of 1998," from his second collection, All of You on the Good Earth, was translated into Spanish as "Noches de 1998" in the program for a performance of a musical setting of the poem by Christopher LaRosa at UNAM (Universidad Nacional Autónoma de México) in Mexico City, May 29, 2018.

=== Collections ===
Hilbert's first collection, Sixty Sonnets, was issued by Red Hen Press in early 2009. His second collection, All of You on the Good Earth, was published on March 1, 2013.

His third collection, Caligulan, was published on September 24, 2015 by Measure Press, and was selected as winner of the 2017 Poets' Prize. Rowan Ricardo Phillips wrote that "moved by beauty, attuned to the sublimity of natural things, livened by paradox, coaxed into song by pentameter, Ernest Hilbert's rich new book covers more emotional ground than a reader has any right to expect." Rachel Hadas wrote that the poems in the collection "fashion a stern, witty, and often poignant music out of seemingly unpromising elements courageously glimpsed, combined, or imagined."

His fourth collection, Last One Out, was published by Measure Press in 2019. A. E. Stallings wrote in a review that "Hilbert is enjoying, mid-career, a new formal freedom, and with it, wider territory to cover, or perhaps vice versa," adding "here a certain amount of youthful edge and swagger has been worn away, but is replaced by mastery, depth, and mellowed sweetness."

== Books ==
- Storm Swimmer (UNT Press, 2023), ISBN 1574418955, poetry
- Last One Out (Measure Press, 2019), ISBN 978-1939574299, poetry
- Caligulan (Measure Press, 2015), ISBN 978-1939574138, poetry; selected as winner of the 2017 Poets' Prize
- All of You on the Good Earth (Red Hen Press, 2013), ISBN 1597092665, poetry
- Against the Art of War, with Henry Wessells (contributor) and Judith Clute (artist). (San Francisco, London, Upper Montclair: Temporary Culture, 2013), signed-limited fine press art book with aquatint etchings, sold by subscription
- Sixty Sonnets (Red Hen Press, 2009), ISBN 1-59709-361-0, poetry
- Aim Your Arrows at the Sun (LATR Editions, New York, 2009), hand-sewn, letterpress chapbook

== Music ==
In 2014, Hilbert began work as librettist for a new opera with composer Stella Sung titled The Book Collector, commissioned by the Dayton Performing Arts Alliance. The opera, which incorporates 3-D digital technology and a ballet, is a historical tragedy intended to accompany Carl Orff's Carmina Burana. It premiered in May 2016. Hilbert also supplied the story and libretto for Sung's three-act opera, The Red Silk Thread, a historical drama about Marco Polo set in the court of Kublai Khan.

He has also composed libretti for Daniel Felsenfeld, and has provided lyrics for song cycles by the composer Christopher LaRosa. He has also worked with a number of indie rock bands, and recorded an album of himself and others including Quincy R. Lehr and Paul Siegell reading from his book Sixty Sonnets, backed by several musicians, including a drummer, bassist, organist, and guitarist, as well as a full orchestra and harp, released on March 15, 2013. The music on three sections of the album was written by Marc Hildenberger and Dave Young, both formerly of the band The Grayjacks. The music for the final section of the album, scored for strings, harp, and piano, was supplied by classical composer Christopher LaRosa. Portions of the album were performed live with Hilbert's studio backing band Legendary Misbehavior, supplemented by additional musicians from the Philadelphia band East Coastamite on March 16, 2013, at Fergie's Pub in Philadelphia.
