= Ib and Little Christina =

Isabel Jay, Robert Evett and Ela Q. May in the 1901 opera

Ib and Little Christina refers to two theatrical adaptations by Basil Hood of the 1855 fairy tale by Hans Andersen of the same name: a play (1900) and an opera (1901).

== Play ==
The first version was a play subtitled "A Picture in 3 Parts", with incidental music by Arthur Bruhns, first produced at the Prince of Wales Theatre, opening on 15 May 1900 and running for 60 performances. It starred Martin Harvey and the nine-year-old Phyllis Dare. The piece transferred to the Coronet Theatre that summer. There was also a Broadway run in 1900. It was revived at Terry's Theatre in January 1903, playing for 16 performances, and again at Terry's in early 1904, for 31 more performances. The play was also revived at the Adelphi Theatre in September 1908, playing for seven performances.

== Opera ==
Christina introduces her new lover to her childhood sweetheart

Hood rewrote Ib and Little Christina as an opera styled "A Picture in 3 Panels", with music by Franco Leoni. It was first produced by William Greet at the Savoy Theatre on 14 November 1901 and ran together with Hood's The Willow Pattern for 16 performances, until the end of November. The libretto was published by Chappell & Co., and a copy is in the British Library at 11778.f.23(4) (1901).

The Times described the piece as "an opera of ultra-modern type" and compared it unflatteringly to the work of Arthur Sullivan, who had died earlier in that year. The Manchester Guardian later said that "the music, though clever and attractive in many ways, was too realistic and too Southern to reflect the Northern symbolism of Andersen's story, and that its peculiar vein of passion was out of place." The piece was revived at Daly's Theatre from 11 to 13 January 1904, then transferred to the Lyric Theatre from 19 January to 5 March 1904, running for a total of 23 matinee performances. The opera is not quite a full-length piece and is played in three short scenes.

== Opera synopsis ==
Ib and his father are poor and live alone; Old Henrik and his granddaughter Christina are their neighbours. The two children are in love, and Ib is willing to sacrifice everything for her. An old gypsy woman visits Ib and grants him three wishes.

Fifteen years later, the children have grown up, and Christina is in love with John, a prosperous innkeeper. Broken‑hearted but faithful, Ib gives her up.

Seven years later, the marriage brought no happiness to Christina, who died in poverty. The gypsy woman brings Christina's daughter (also called Christina) to Ib, and they live happily together.

== Roles and original casts ==
	Play, 1900 Prince of Wales	Play, 1900 Coronet	Opera, 1901 Savoy	Play, 1903 Terry's	Opera, 1904 Daly's	Play, 1904 Terry's	Play, 1908 Adelphi
Ib's father	Charles Lander	Charles Lander	Henry Lytton	Julian Cross	Ivor Foster	William Dunlop	Albert E. Raynor
Little Ib	Vyvian Thomas	Vyvian Thomas	Laurence Emery	Philip Tonge	Louise Douste	Roy Lorraine	Bobbie Andrews
Old Henrik, Christina's grandfather	Holbrook Blinn	J. H. Barnes	H. Thorndike	J. D. Beveridge	Gordon Cleather	George Mudie, Jr	Phillip Hewland
Ib's Mother/Gipsy Woman	Mary Rorke	Mary Rorke	Isabel Jay	Mary Rorke	Susan Strong	Irene Rooke	Mary Rorke
Little Christina	Phyllis Dare	Phyllis Dare	Ela Q. May	Doris Middleton	Ela Q. May	Winifred Winter	Rita Leggiero
Ib	Martin Harvey	Holbrook Blinn	Robert Evett	Holbrook Blinn	Ben Davies	Sydney Blow	Martin Harvey
John	H. Nye Chart	H. Nye Chart	Powis Pinder	Vincent Sternroyd	Charles Bennett	Edward Bonfield	George Cooke
Christina	Eva Moore	Louie Pounds	Louie Pounds	Daisy Thimm	Edna Thornton	Dorothy Drake	Amy Coleridge

Source: The London Stage, 1900−1909, The Era, and The Stage.

== Sources ==
- Wearing, J. P. (1981). The London Stage, 1900–1909: A Calendar of Plays and Players. Metuchen: Scarecrow Press. ISBN 9780810814035. OCLC 1245534136.
