= Antigono =

Antigono may refer to:

- Antigono, an opera libretto by Pietro Metastasio that was set by multiple composers. It is based on the conflict between Antigonos II Gonatas and Alexander II of Epirus. See operas below.
- Antigono (Hasse), 1743 opera by Johann Adolf Hasse
- Antigono (Gluck), 1756 opera by Christoph Willibald Gluck
- Antigono (Mazzoni), a 1755 opera by Antonio Maria Mazzoni
- Antigono (Mysliveček), a 1780 opera by Josef Mysliveček
