= La fausse esclave =

Opera by Christoph Willibald Gluck

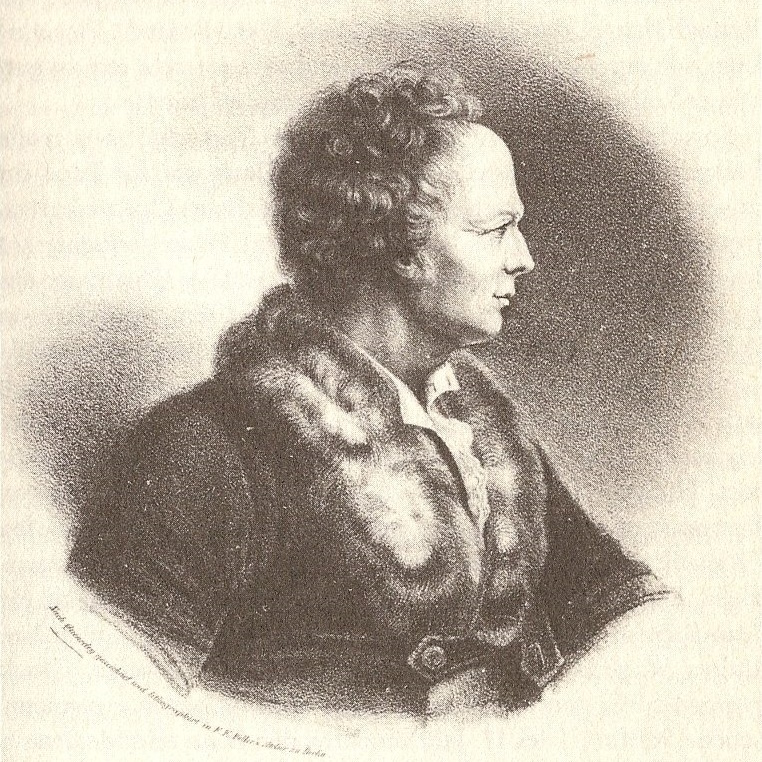
Portrait of Christoph Willibald Gluck, ca. 1750

La fausse esclave (The False Slave) is an opéra comique in one act by Christoph Willibald Gluck. Its French-language libretto based on Louis Anseaume and Pierre-Augustin Lefèvre de Marcouville's libretto for La fausse aventurière (The False Adventuress), an opéra comique by Jean-Louis Laruette. It was first performed on 8 January 1758 at the Burgtheater in Vienna. The full score is lost, but a keyboard version is extant.

Klaus Hortschansky has noted that La fausse esclave is one of Gluck's few stageworks where the composer did not use musical material from prior works, or recycle material from it into future works.

== Roles ==
Roles, voice types
Role	Voice type
Agathe	soprano
Lisette	soprano
Valère	tenor
Chrisante	baritone

== Synopsis ==
The story is of an intrigue undertaken to secure a father's assent to his daughter's marriage.
