= Pierre-Augustin Lefèvre de Marcouville =

Pierre-Augustin Lefèvre de Marcouville, called Marcouville, (28 October 1723 – 1790) was an 18th-century French lawyer and playwright.

A lawyer in Parlement, he was secretary to Honoré III, Prince of Monaco and wrote a dozen opéras comiques, alone or in collaboration.

== Works ==
- 1750: Le Sommeil de Thalie
- 1751: Le Mai
- 1752: Fanfale
- 1754: Bertholde à la ville
- 1756: Les Amants trompés
- 1757: La Fausse Aventurière, revived the following year under the title La Fausse Esclave, music by Gluck
- 1757: La Petite Maison
- 1758: L'Heureux Déguisement
- 1758: Le Médecin de l'amour
- 1760: Le Maître d'école
- 1760: L'Île des fous
