= Johann Heinrich Friedrich Müller =

German actor and writer (1738–1815)

Johann Heinrich Friedrich Müller (20 February 1738 – 8 August 1815) was a German actor, writer and Singspiel poet.

== Life ==
Born in Aderstedt, Müller is said to have been called Schröder or Schroeter at first. After the early death of his father, he attended the Latina of the Franckesche Stiftungen in Halle (Saale) from 1749. When he accidentally set a fire there, he fled from this institution. Puppeteers, coming from Lauchstädt, had a lasting effect on Müller. He played the play they gave him on a homemade theatre stage, which exploded and caught fire when gunpowder was ignited.

Müller fled to his brother, a priest in Halle's surroundings. The latter sent him to the cathedral school in Magdeburg. There he was trained as an actor by Franz Schuch der Jüngere and took on the surname Müller. In Potsdam, he had his first public appearance in the Garnisonkirche, which was followed by many others.

From 1763, Müller was active in Vienna and lived there with his family in Bürgerspitalzinshaus.

In 1767–1768, Müller wrote the numbers 11–13 of the Singspiel-libretto Bastien und Bastienne, which was set to music by Wolfgang Amadeus Mozart.

As a teacher, Müller taught Vladimir Odoyevsky, and perhaps John Field, Alexander Griboyedov, and Alexander Alyabyev.

Müller died in Vienna.

== Family ==
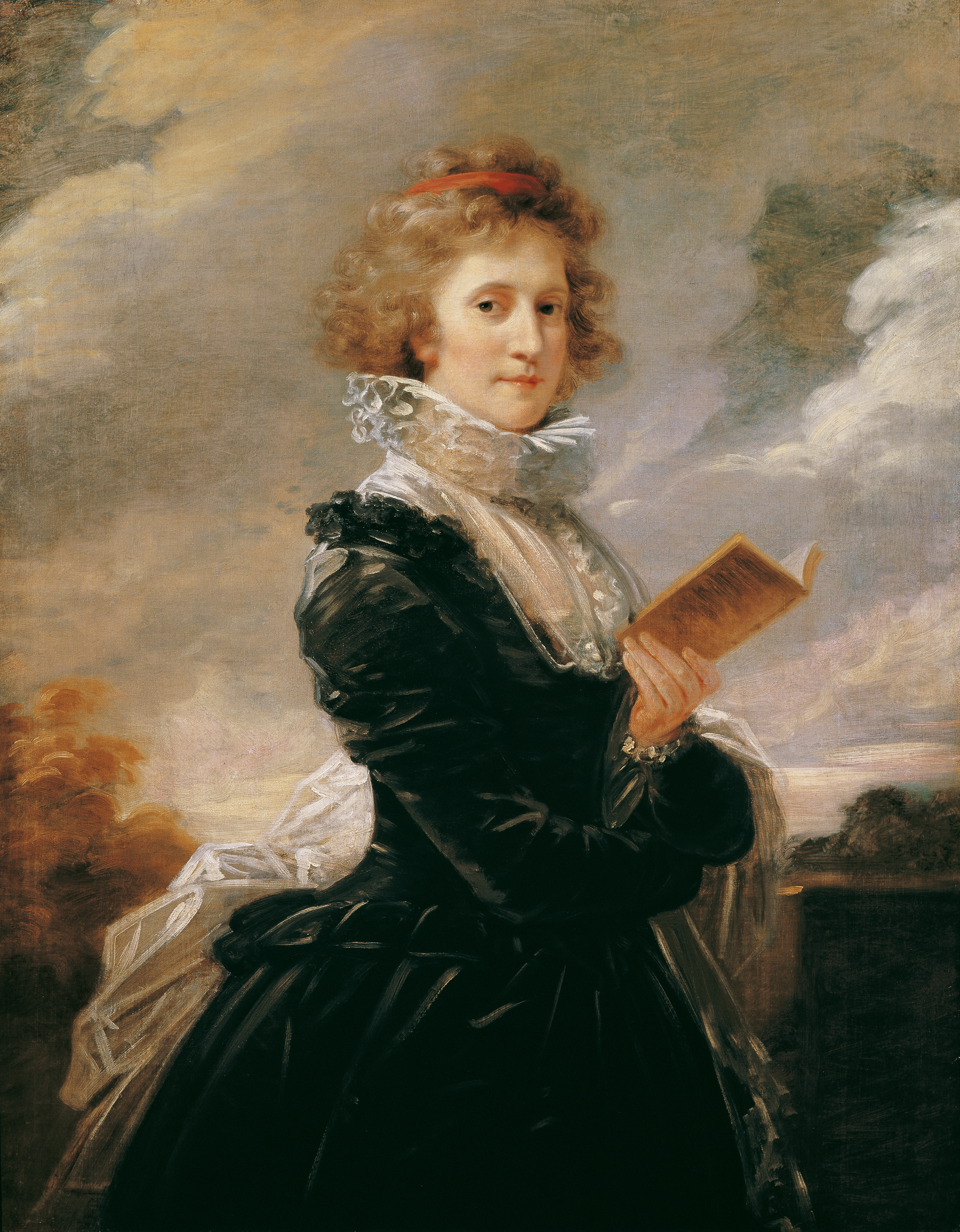
Heinrich Friedrich Füger: Die Schauspielerin Josefa Hortensia Füger, die Frau des Künstlers, c. 1797, Belvedere, Vienna

Müller's children included:

- Josephine Hortense Müller (31 March 1766 Vienna – 1808 ibid), 1782–1799 court actress, married the painter Heinrich Friedrich Füger in 1790.
- Friedrich Josef Müller (19 December 1768 Vienna – 9 September 1834 ibid), 1785–1804 Court actor, afterwards k. k. servant,
- Anna Müller (1771 Vienna – 11 February 1842 ibid), actress, member of the court theatre from 1798.
- Victoria Müller (1781 Vienna – 17 February 1802 ibid), actress.

== Work ==
- Der Ball, oder der versetzte Schmuck. Ein Lustspiel worin ein Hannswurst erscheint in zween Aufzügen, Vienna 1770 (numerized)
- Stirbt der Fuchs, so gilt’s den Balg, Ländliches Gemälde, Vienna 1770
- Vier Narren in einer Person. Vorspiel, Vienna 1770
- Die unähnlichen Brüder, Lustspiel, Vienna 1771
- Gräfinn Tarnow. Ein Originaldrama in fünf Aufzügen, Vienna 1771 (numerised)
- Die Insel der Liebe, oder Amor, Erforscher der Herzen, Lustspiel, Vienna 1773
- Präsentirt das Gewehr, Lustspiel, Vienna 1775
- Genaue Nachrichten von den beyden k. k. Schaubühnen und anderen öffentlichen Ergötzlichkeiten in Wien, Vienna 1772
- Genaue Nachrichten von den beyden kaiserl. königl. Schaubühnen in Wien, und den vorzüglichsten Theatern der übrigen kais. kön. Erbländer. Zweyter Theil. Nebst einem Lustspiele, Vienna 1773 (numerized)
- Tagebuch von beyden k. k. Theatern in Wien, Vienna 1775
- J. H. F. Müllers Abschied von der k. k. Hof- und National-Schaubühne. Mit einer kurzen Biographie seines Lebens und einer gedrängten Geschichte des hiesigen Hoftheaters, Vienna 1802 (numerized)
