= Daniel-Paul Chappuzeau de Baugé =

Daniel-Paul Chappuzeau de Baugé, born in Lyon – died ca. 1729, was a French civil servant and an opera librettist of the 18th century.

== Short biography ==
The son of a minister of the Protestant religion, Chappuzeau abjured calvinism and took the little collar before leaving the ecclesiastical habit. He then tried writing, in particular by giving the lyrics of Coronis, pastorale héroïque, presented by the Académie royale de musique, on 23 March 1691, to music composed by Theobaldo di Gatti.

After marrying Claire Gamart in 1693, he was admitted by the credit of his wife's family, in several sub-farms (like a tax district in which he was tax collector), which brought him a considerable fortune. This helped him acquire a position in the King's Council, into which he was received on 18 September 1693. In this capacity, his name can be seen in the permission for publication of several books.

Daniel-Paul was related to Samuel Chappuzeau. Daniel-Paul's father was Jacques Chappuzeau, sieur de Baugé, who abjured Calvinism in 1685. Jacques was the son of Jehan Chappuzeau, Samuel's uncle. Daniel-Paul's family married into the French and Belgian nobility, and there are many living descendants.

Although some sources say he died in 1739, there are several documents available which make it clear that he died in or before 1729, when his successor in the King's council was appointed. See from 1729-12-14 "Succession sous bénéfice d'inventaire pour Paulin Louis, Claire Marguerite et Jeanne Louise CHAPPUZEAU de BAUGE, tous trois enfants de défunt Daniel Paul Chappuzeau de Baugé, ecuyer"

== Sources ==
- Antoine de Léris, Dictionnaire portatif, historique et littéraire des théâtres, t. 3, Paris, C. A. Jombert, p. 510.
