= Midas (burletta) =

Burletta, or 'mock opera', by Kane O'Hara

Midas is a burletta, or 'mock opera', by Kane O'Hara.

Originally performed privately in 1760 near Lurgan, Ireland, it was revised and expanded with the encouragement of Lord Mornington, and was presented in its new form in Dublin in 1762 and at Covent Garden Theatre, London on 26 February 1764 (where it was performed over 200 times in the next 35 years), with an overture by John Collett. It was staged at the Theatres Royal around 1784. Le jugement de Midas is an opera by André Grétry based on O'Hara's work.

== Bibliography ==
- Rachel Talbot: "The Influence of the Paris Stage on Kane O'Hara's Midas", in: Journal of the Society for Musicology in Ireland, vol. 12 (2016–17), p. 33–66.
