= Daniel Felsenfeld =

American classical composer (born 1970)

Daniel Felsenfeld (born January 5, 1970) is a composer of contemporary classical music and a writer.

== Biography ==
Felsenfeld was born in Washington, D.C., raised primarily in Southern California and currently resides in Brooklyn with his wife, writer Elizabeth Isadora Gold, and child August. He attended the University of California, Santa Barbara where he got his undergraduate degree in composition. He did his Masters and Doctoral work at the New England Conservatory where he studied with Arthur Berger and Lee Hyla. He is a composer and is also an author, having written three books published by Amadeus Press as well as hundreds of articles. In 2007 a "Talk of the Town" piece in The New Yorker magazine noted several writers whom Felsenfeld met at the MacDowell Colony who used his last name in their novels.

== Music ==
=== Orchestral music ===
- The Dresden Soul Symphony (2008, with Larry Gold) for orchestra, chorus, rock band, and four soul singers
- Insomnia Redux; 4am (2005) for orchestra
- Thursday Night Overture (1999) for chamber orchestra
- The Bridge (2003) for soprano and chamber orchestra
- Summer and All it Brings (2002) solo cantata for soprano, narrator and chamber orchestra
- Busmeat: A Parable (1998) for orchestra
- Nicotine Sinfonietta (1997 for chamber orchestra
- Bad Coffee Serenade (1994) concerto for violin and chamber orchestra

=== Opera ===
- Exposure (2020) for two sopranos, bass clarinet and marimba, libretto by Bea Goodwin
- The Last of Manhattan (2004) for singers and chamber ensemble, libretto by Ernest Hilbert
- Summer and All it Brings (2002) for soprano, narrator, harpsichord and cello, libretto by Ernest Hilbert
- Thursday Night: Suite from an Abandoned Opera (1999) for singers and chamber orchestra

=== Chamber music ===
- "You.Have.No.Idea" (2009–10) for string quartet
- All Work and No Play (2007) for piccolo and piano
- Life Shrinks (2007) for piano, cello and percussion—music for dance
- Living Room Suite (2006) for string trio
- For Stephanie (2006) for string quartet
- First Scenes from Red Room (2006) for violin and piano
- From Maldoror (2003) for flute, oboe, piano and narrator
- I Conquered Egypt (2000) for piano trio
- Let Me Out (1999) for timpani, cello and bass clarinet
- Live ‘Til Twilight (1999) for cello and piano
- Fast Living (1999) for cello and percussion
- Cultivating Cool (1999) for flute, clarinet, trumpet, piano, percussion and double bass
- Smoking My Diploma (1998) for oboe, cello and piano
- Looking for Funny Dog (1998) for flute and organ
- O I LIKE the LIFE that I’m LEADING (1997) for flute and piano
- Something Very Serious (1995) for violin and piano
- Don’t Call me Sir (1994) for clarinet and piano
- Bad Coffee Serenade (1994) for violin and piano

=== Solo music ===
- Down to You Is Up, Three Movements for solo piano (1999)
- Air That Kills for solo violin (2000)
- A Dirty Little Secret for solo piano (2003)
- Insomnia Redux; 4am for solo piano (2003)
- Obsession No. 1: Toscanini’s Glasses for solo piano (2008)
- The Cohen Variations for solo piano (2009)
- Hooked to the Silver Screen for solo viola (2011)

=== Vocal music ===
- "From Sleepless Nights" (2009) for mezzo-soprano and cello
- In My Craft and Sullen Art (2008) for soprano and piano
- The Poet's Dream of Herself as a Young Girl (2008) for mezzo-soprano and piano trio
- Fall, Leaves, Fall (2007) for soprano and piano
- “Aria” from Magnificat (2007) for soprano and piano
- To a Cabaret Dancer (2007) for mezzo-soprano and piano
- Dry Sandwiches (2007) for soprano and piano
- Lines for Winter (2007) for tenor and piano
- You Want a Social Life, With Friends (2007) for baritone and piano
- Annus Mirabilis (2007) for bass and piano
- True Love (2007) for soprano and organ
- The Bridge (2003) cycle of five songs for soprano and piano; inspired by the poetry of W. H. Auden and Ernest Hilbert, and The Bridge of San Luis Rey by Thornton Wilder
- New Forms of Control (2000) for female voices, two synthesizers, and percussion
- I May Never Get Home (1999) cycle of seven songs for baritone and piano
- Thank You, Goodnight (1999) cycle of five songs for soprano and piano
- L’Envoi (1999) for soprano and piano
- Sunday Night (1999) for soprano and piano
- Elizabeth Among the Rains (1997) cycle of five songs for mezzo-soprano and piano
- From the Letters of Heloise (1996) for soprano, clarinet, bass clarinet, percussion and strings
- I Am Saturn (1997) cycle of three songs for soprano and piano
- Equals (1996) for soprano and string quartet
- Five Songs for Five Friends (1995) cycle of five songs for soprano and piano

=== Choral music ===
- Revolutions of Ruin (2008) for SATB chorus with soprano and baritone soloists and chamber orchestra
- Manhattan Choruses (2004) for SATB chorus and organ

== Books ==
- Antonio Vivaldi and the Baroque Tradition, with Donna Getzinger
- Benjamin Britten and Samuel Barber: Their Lives and Music
- Johannes Brahms and the Twilight of Romanticism, with Donna Getzinger
- Richard Wagner and German Opera
- George Frideric Handel and Music for Voices, with Donna Getzinger
- Tchaikovsky: A Listener's Guide Book
- Johann Sebastian Bach and the Art of Baroque Music with Donna Getzinger
- Charles Ives and Aaron Copland—A Listener's Guide
