= Kane O'Hara =

18th century Irish composer

Kane O'Hara (1711 or 1712 – 17 June 1782) was an Irish composer and playwright.

== Biography ==
O'Hara was born at Templehouse, Connaught, Ireland, the second son of Kean O'Hara, high-sheriff of County Sligo. He graduated from Trinity College, Dublin in 1735. In 1757 he was a co-founder member, with the Earl of Mornington, of the Musical Academy in Dublin.

His first publicly performed piece was the burletta Midas, stylistically a bridge between ballad opera and comic opera. The work mixes Irish, English, French and Italian popular airs in O'Hara's arrangements with spoken recitatives. "O'Hara's verse rarely rises above clever doggerel."

In 1774, Kane established a theatre in Dublin called Mr. Punch's Patagonian Theatre, which in 1776 transferred to London, producing puppet show versions of operas and burlettas. He went blind in 1781 but continued his interest in theatre until his death in Dublin the following year. A number of his papers and manuscripts are held at the National Library of Ireland.

== Works ==
- Midas: An English Burletta (Dublin, 1762)
- The Golden Pippin: An English Burletta (London, 1773)
- The two Misers: A Musical Farce (London, 1775)
- April-Day. A Burletta (London, 1777)
- Tom Thumb the Great: A Burlesque Tragedy (Dublin, 1810)

== Bibliography ==
- Margaret F. Maxwell: "Olympus at Billingsgate: The Burlettas of Kane O'Hara", in: Educational Theatre Journal 15 (1963), p. 130-135.
- Ita M. Hogan: Anglo-Irish Music 1780–1830 (Cork: Cork University Press, 1966).
- T.J. Walsh: Opera in Dublin 1705–1797: the Social Scene (Dublin: Figgis, 1973).
- Walter H. Rubsamen: "Irish Folk Music in Midas, a Ballad Burlesque of the 18th Century", in: IMS Congress Report Copenhagen 1972, ed. Glahn et al. (Copenhagen, 1974), p. 623-362.
- Phyllis T. Dircks: The Eighteenth-Century English Burletta (Victoria B.C.: University of Victoria Press, 1999).
- Rachel Talbot: "The Influence of the Paris Stage on Kane O'Hara's Midas", in: Journal of the Society for Musicology in Ireland, vol. 12 (2016–17), p. 33–66.
- Michael Burden: "Midas, Kane O'Hara and the Italians. An Interplay of Comedy between London and Dublin", in: David O'Shaughnessy (ed.): Ireland, Enlightenment and the English Stage, 1740–1820 (Cambridge: Cambridge University Press, 2019), pp. 101–127.
