= Diana (mythology) =

Roman goddess of hunting and the wild

- Goddess of the hunt, wild animals, fertility, and the Moon
- Member of the Dii Consentes
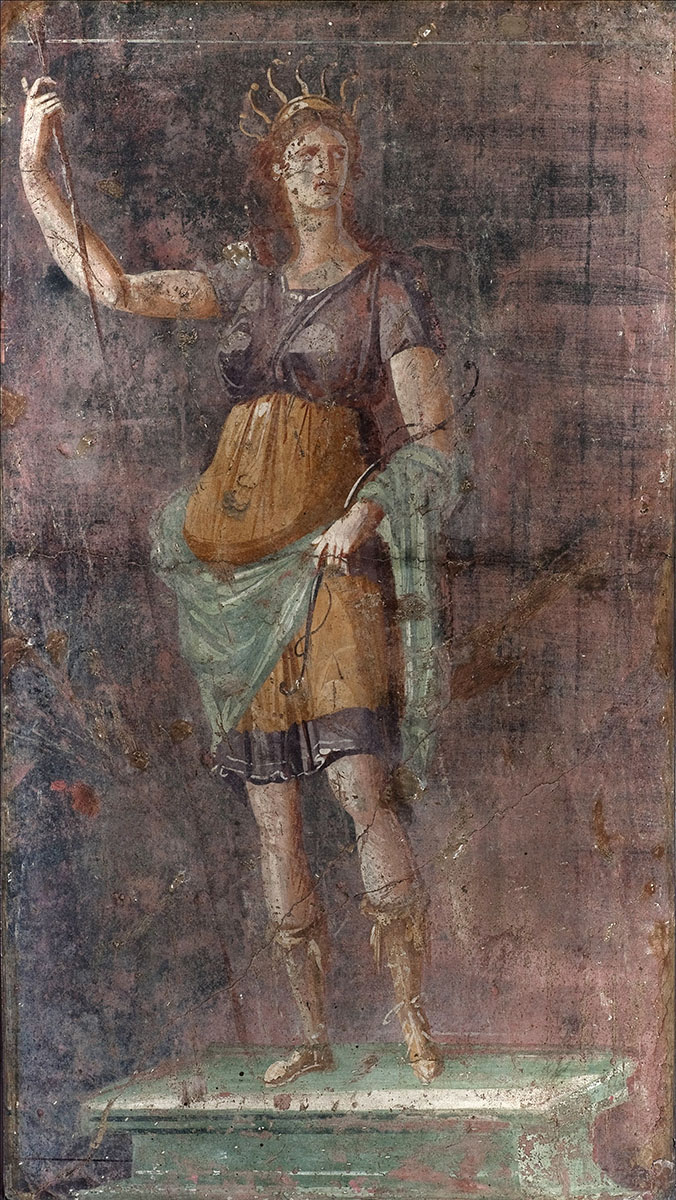
- Statue of Diana-Artemis, fresco from Pompeii, 50–1 BCE
- Symbol: Bow and quiver, deer, hunting dogs, crescent moon
- Temples: Sanctuary at Lake Nemi, Temple of Diana (Rome)
- Festivals: Nemoralia
- Parents: Jupiter and Latona: Hellenistic: Jupiter and Latona; Hellenistic: Apollo; Middle Ages & Modern: Aradia

Equivalents
- Greek: Artemis

Diana (Note: Latin: [diˈaːna]; conservative pronunciation: [diːˈaːna]. The name was also written as Deiana by the Romans.) is a goddess in Roman religion, primarily considered a patroness of the countryside and nature, hunters, wildlife, childbirth, crossroads, the night, and the Moon. She is equated with the Greek goddess Artemis, and absorbed much of Artemis' mythology early in Roman history, including a birth on the island of Delos to parents Jupiter and Latona, and a twin brother, Apollo, though she had an independent origin in Italy.

Diana is revered in modern neopagan religions including Roman neopaganism, Stregheria, and Wicca. In the ancient, medieval, and modern periods, Diana has been considered a triple deity, merged with a goddess of the moon (Luna/Selene) and the underworld (usually Hecate).

== Etymology ==
The name Dīāna probably derives from Latin dīus ('godly'), ultimately from Proto-Italic *dīwī, meaning 'divine, heavenly'. It stems from Proto-Indo-European *diwyós ('divine, heavenly'), formed with the stem *dyew- ('daylight sky') attached the thematic suffix -yós. Cognates appear in Myceanean Greek di-wi-ja, in Ancient Greek dîos (δῖος; 'belonging to heaven, godlike'), and in Sanskrit divyá ('heavenly' or 'celestial').

The ancient Latin writers Varro and Cicero considered the etymology of Dīāna as allied to that of dies and connected to the shine of the Moon, noting that one of her titles is Diana Lucifera ("light-bearer").

... people regard Diana and the moon as one and the same. ... the moon (luna) is so called from the verb to shine (lucere). Lucina is identified with it, which is why in our country they invoke Juno Lucina in childbirth, just as the Greeks call on Diana the Light-bearer. Diana also has the name Omnivaga ("wandering everywhere"), not because of her hunting but because she is numbered as one of the seven planets; her name Diana derives from the fact that she turns darkness into daylight (dies). She is invoked at childbirth because children are born occasionally after seven, or usually after nine, lunar revolutions ...

--Quintus Lucilius Balbus as recorded by Marcus Tullius Cicero and translated by P. G. Walsh. De Natura Deorum (On the Nature of the Gods), Book II, Part ii, Section c

== Description ==
=== As a goddess of the countryside ===
The persona of Diana is complex, and contains a number of archaic features. Diana was originally considered to be a goddess of the wilderness and of the hunt, a central sport in both Roman and Greek culture. Early Roman inscriptions to Diana celebrated her primarily as a huntress and patron of hunters. Later, in the Hellenistic period, Diana came to be equally or more revered as a goddess not of the wild woodland but of the "tame" countryside, or villa rustica, the idealization of which was common in Greek thought and poetry. This dual role as goddess of both civilization and the wild, and therefore the civilized countryside, first applied to the Greek goddess Artemis (for example, in the 3rd century BCE poetry of Anacreon).

By the 3rd century CE, after Greek influence had a profound impact on Roman religion, Diana had been almost fully combined with Artemis and took on many of her attributes, both in her spiritual domains and in the description of her appearance. The Roman poet Nemesianus wrote a typical description of Diana: She carried a bow and a quiver full of golden arrows, wore a golden cloak, purple half-boots, and a belt with a jeweled buckle to hold her tunic together, and wore her hair gathered in a ribbon. By the 5th century CE, almost a millennium after her cult's entry into Rome, the philosopher Proclus could still characterize Diana as "the inspective guardian of every thing rural, [who] represses every thing rustic and uncultivated."

=== As a triple goddess ===
Diana was often considered an aspect of a triple goddess, known as Diana triformis: Diana, Luna, and Hecate. According to historian C.M. Green, "these were neither different goddesses nor an amalgamation of different goddesses. They were Diana...Diana as huntress, Diana as the moon, Diana of the underworld." At her sacred grove on the shores of Lake Nemi, Diana was venerated as a triple goddess beginning in the late 6th century BCE.

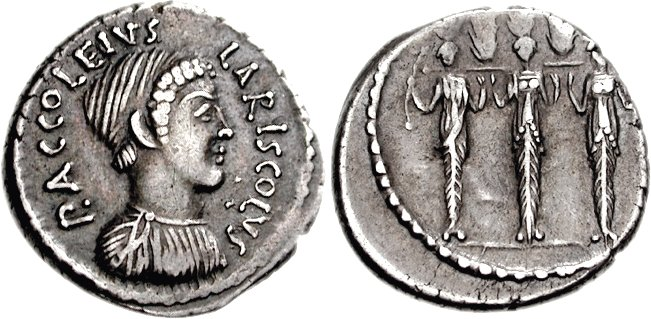
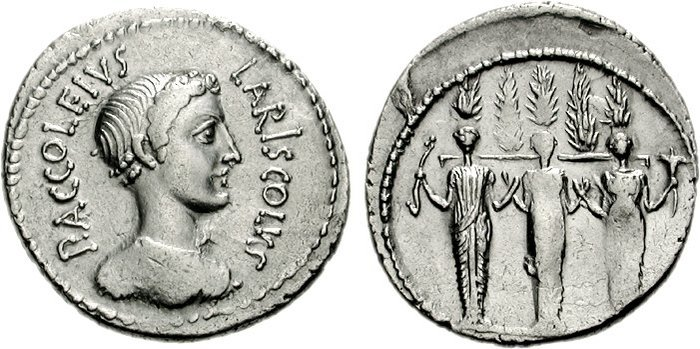
Two examples of a 1st-century BCE denarius (RRC 486/1) depicting the head of Diana Nemorensis and her triple cult statue

Andreas Alföldi interpreted an image on a late Republican coin as the Latin Diana "conceived as a threefold unity of the divine huntress, the Moon goddess and the goddess of the nether world, Hekate". This coin, minted by P. Accoleius Lariscolus in 43 BCE, has been acknowledged as representing an archaic statue of Diana Nemorensis. It represents Artemis with the bow at one extremity, Luna-Selene with flowers at the other and a central deity not immediately identifiable, all united by a horizontal bar. The iconographical analysis allows the dating of this image to the 6th century at which time there are Etruscan models. The coin shows that the triple goddess cult image still stood in the lucus of Nemi in 43 BCE. Lake Nemi was called Triviae lacus by Virgil (Aeneid 7.516), while Horace called Diana montium custos nemoremque virgo ("keeper of the mountains and virgin of Nemi") and diva triformis ("three-form goddess").

Two heads found in the sanctuary and the Roman theatre at Nemi, which have a hollow on their back, lend support to this interpretation of an archaic triple Diana.

=== As goddess of crossroads and the underworld ===
The earliest epithet of Diana was Trivia, and she was addressed with that title by Virgil, Catullus, and many others. "Trivia" comes from the Latin trivium, "triple way", and refers to Diana's guardianship over roadways, particularly Y-junctions or three-way crossroads. This role carried a somewhat dark and dangerous connotation, as it metaphorically pointed the way to the underworld. In the 1st-century CE play Medea, Seneca's titular sorceress calls on Trivia to cast a magic spell. She evokes the triple goddess of Diana, Selene, and Hecate, and specifies that she requires the powers of the latter. The 1st century poet Horace similarly wrote of a magic incantation invoking the power of both Diana and Proserpina. The symbol of the crossroads is relevant to several aspects of Diana's domain. It can symbolize the paths hunters may encounter in the forest, lit only by the full moon; this symbolizes making choices "in the dark" without the light of guidance.

Diana's role as a goddess of the underworld, or at least of ushering people between life and death, caused her early on to be conflated with Hecate (and occasionally also with Proserpina). However, her role as an underworld goddess appears to pre-date strong Greek influence (though the early Greek colony of Cumae had a cult of Hekate and certainly had contacts with the Latins). A theater in her sanctuary at Lake Nemi included a pit and tunnel that would have allowed actors to easily descend on one side of the stage and ascend on the other, indicating a connection between the phases of the moon and a descent by the moon goddess into the underworld. It is likely that her underworld aspect in her original Latin worship did not have a distinct name, like Luna was for her moon aspect. This is due to a seeming reluctance or taboo by the early Latins to name underworld deities, and the fact that they believed the underworld to be silent, precluding naming. Hekate, a Greek goddess also associated with the boundary between the earth and the underworld, became attached to Diana as a name for her underworld aspect following Greek influence.

=== As goddess of childbirth ===
Diana was often considered to be a goddess associated with fertility and childbirth, and the protection of women during labor. This probably arose as an extension of her association with the moon, whose cycles were believed to parallel the menstrual cycle, and which was used to track the months during pregnancy. At her shrine in Aricia, worshipers left votive terracotta offerings for the goddess in the shapes of babies and wombs, and the temple there also offered care of pups and pregnant dogs. This care of infants also extended to the training of both young people and dogs, especially for hunting. In her role as a protector of childbirth, Diana was called Diana Lucina, Diana Lucifera or even Juno Lucina, because her domain overlapped with that of the goddess Juno. The title of Juno may also have had an independent origin as it applied to Diana, with the literal meaning of "helper" – Diana as Juno Lucina would be the "helper of childbirth".

=== As a "frame god" ===
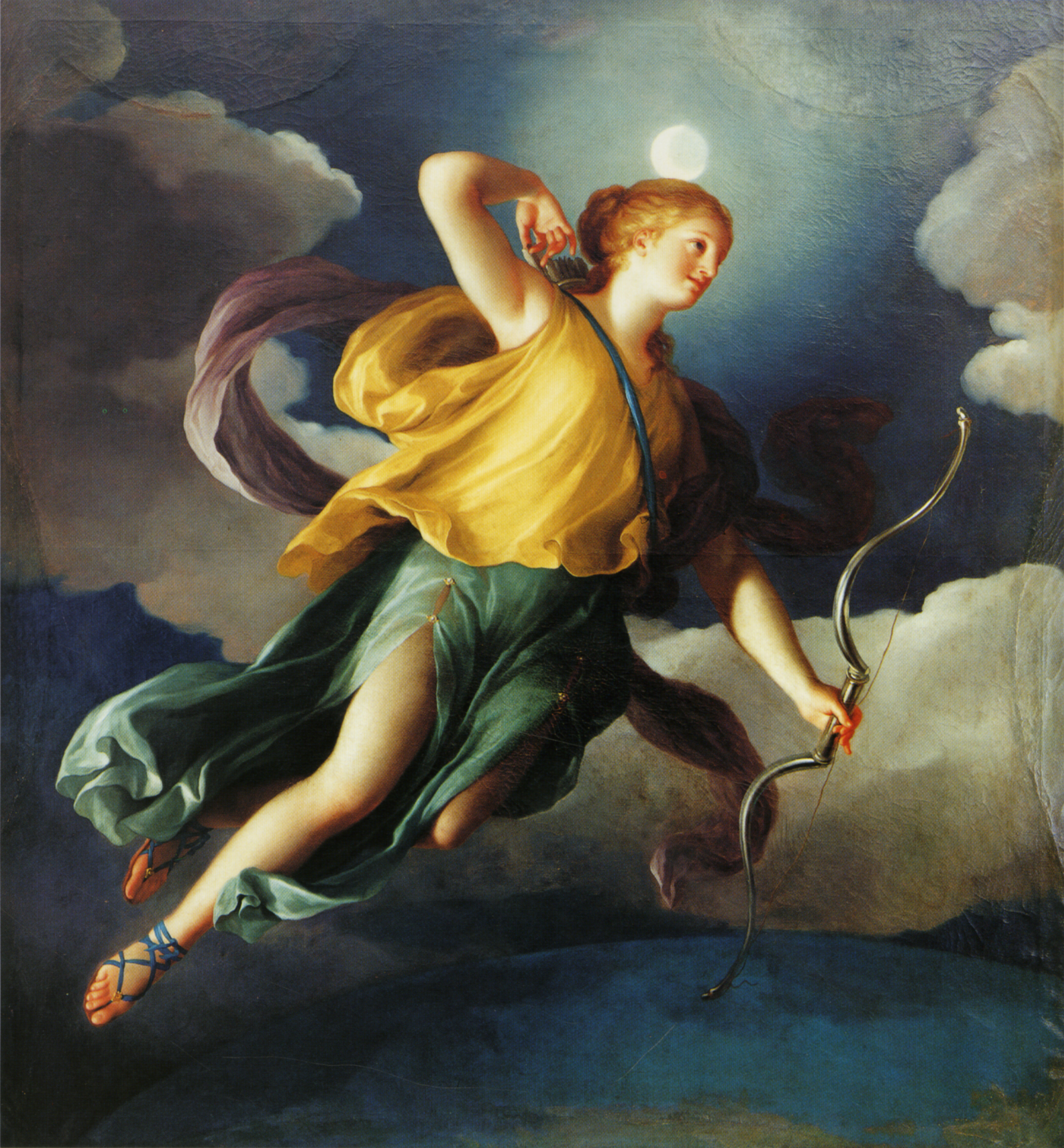
Diana as Personification of the Night. Anton Raphael Mengs, c. 1765.

According to a theory proposed by Georges Dumézil, Diana falls into a particular subset of celestial gods, referred to in histories of religion as frame gods. Such gods, while keeping the original features of celestial divinities (i.e. transcendent heavenly power and abstention from direct rule in worldly matters), did not share the fate of other celestial gods in Indoeuropean religions – that of becoming dei otiosi, or gods without practical purpose, since they did retain a particular sort of influence over the world and mankind. The celestial character of Diana is reflected in her connection with inaccessibility, virginity, light, and her preference for dwelling on high mountains and in sacred woods. Diana, therefore, reflects the heavenly world in its sovereignty, supremacy, impassibility, and indifference towards such secular matters as the fates of mortals and states. At the same time, however, she is seen as active in ensuring the succession of kings and in the preservation of humankind through the protection of childbirth. These functions are apparent in the traditional institutions and cults related to the goddess:

1. The legend of the rex Nemorensis, Diana's sacerdos (priest) in the Arician wood, who held the position until someone else challenged and killed him in a duel, after breaking a branch from a certain tree of the wood. This ever open succession reveals the character and mission of the goddess as a guarantor of kingly status through successive generations. Her function as bestower of authority to rule is also attested in the story related by Livy in which a Sabine man who sacrifices a heifer to Diana wins for his country the seat of the Roman empire.
2. Diana was also worshiped by women who wanted to be pregnant or who, once pregnant, prayed for an easy delivery. This form of worship is attested in archaeological finds of votive statuettes in her sanctuary in the nemus Aricinum as well as in ancient sources, e.g. Ovid.

According to Dumezil, the forerunner of all frame gods is an Indian epic hero who was the image (avatar) of the Vedic god Dyaus. Having renounced the world, in his roles of father and king, he attained the status of an immortal being while retaining the duty of ensuring that his dynasty is preserved and that there is always a new king for each generation. The Scandinavian god Heimdallr performs an analogous function: he is born first and will die last. He too gives origin to kingship and the first king, bestowing on him regal prerogatives. Diana, although a female deity, has exactly the same functions, preserving mankind through childbirth and royal succession.

F. H. Pairault, in her essay on Diana, qualified Dumézil's theory as "impossible to verify".

== Mythology ==
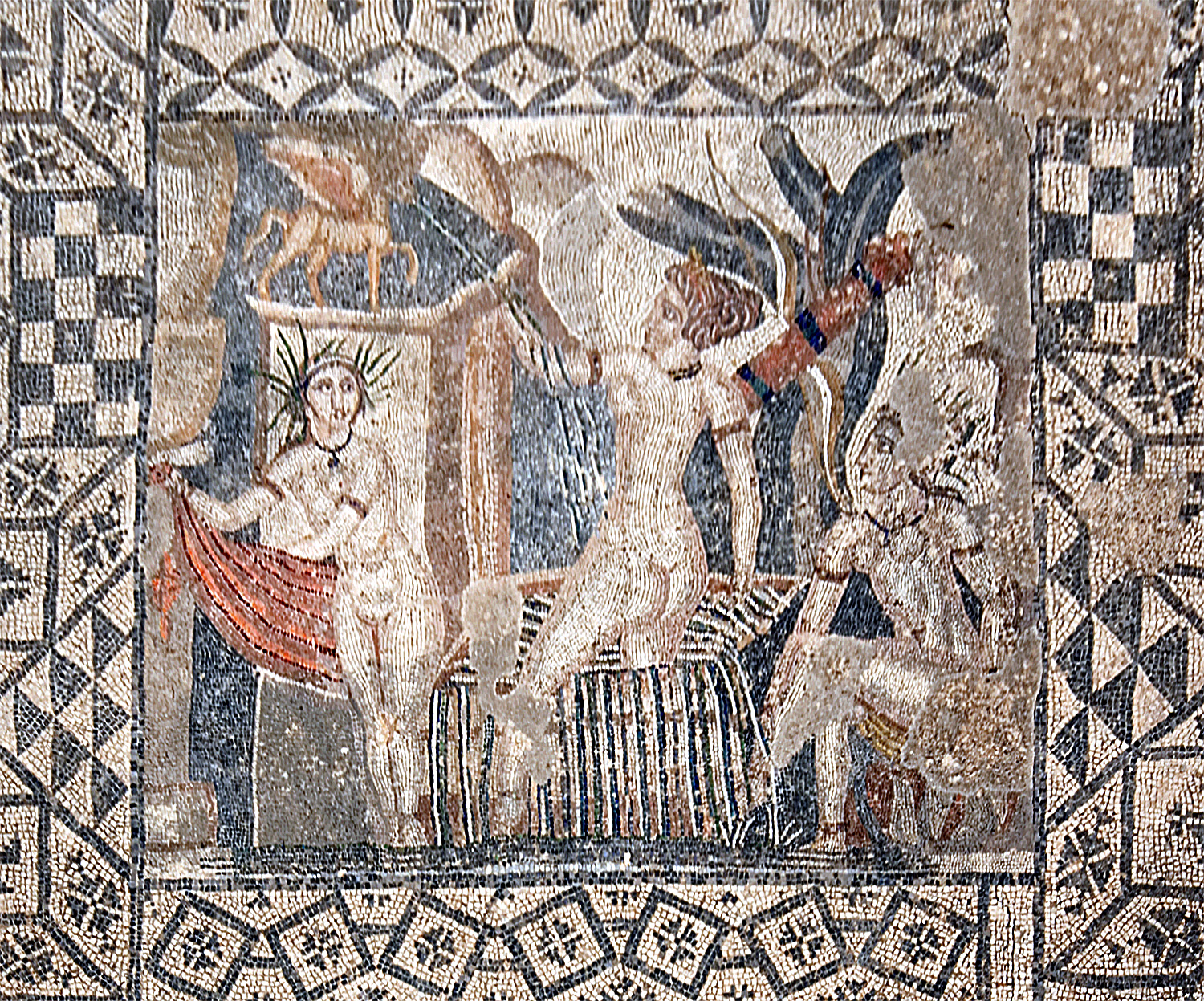
Mosaic depicting Diana and her nymph surprised by Actaeon. Ruins of Volubilis, 2nd century CE.

Unlike the Greek gods, Roman gods were originally considered to be numina: divine powers of presence and will that did not necessarily have physical form. At the time Rome was founded, Diana and the other major Roman gods probably did not have much mythology per se, or any depictions in human form. The idea of gods as having anthropomorphic qualities and human-like personalities and actions developed later, under the influence of Greek and Etruscan religion.

By the 3rd century BCE, Diana is found listed among the twelve major gods of the Roman pantheon by the poet Ennius. Though the Capitoline Triad were the primary state gods of Rome, early Roman myth did not assign a strict hierarchy to the gods the way Greek mythology did, though the Greek hierarchy would eventually be adopted by Roman religion as well.

Once Greek influence had caused Diana to be considered identical to the Greek goddess Artemis, Diana acquired Artemis's physical description, attributes, and variants of her myths as well. Like Artemis, Diana is usually depicted in art wearing a women's chiton, shortened in the kolpos style to facilitate mobility during hunting, with a hunting bow and quiver, and often accompanied by hunting dogs. A 1st-century BCE Roman coin (see above) depicted her with a unique, short hairstyle, and in triple form, with one form holding a bow and another holding a poppy.

=== Family ===
When worship of Apollo was first introduced to Rome, Diana became conflated with Apollo's sister Artemis as in the earlier Greek myths, and as such she became identified as the daughter of Apollo's parents Latona and Jupiter. Though Diana was usually considered to be a virgin goddess like Artemis, later authors sometimes attributed consorts and children to her. According to Cicero and Ennius, Trivia (an epithet of Diana) and Caelus were the parents of Janus, as well as of Saturn and Ops.

According to Macrobius (who cited Nigidius Figulus and Cicero), Janus and Jana (Diana) are a pair of divinities, worshiped as the sun and moon. Janus was said to receive sacrifices before all the others because, through him, the way of access to the desired deity is made apparent.

=== Myth of Actaeon ===
Diana's mythology incorporated stories which were variants of earlier stories about Artemis. Possibly the most well-known of these is the myth of Actaeon. In Ovid's version of this myth, part of his poem Metamorphoses, he tells of a pool or grotto hidden in the wooded valley of Gargaphie. There, Diana, the goddess of the woods, would bathe and rest after a hunt. Actaeon, a young hunter, stumbled across the grotto and accidentally witnessed the goddess bathing without invitation. In retaliation, Diana splashed him with water from the pool, cursing him, and he was transformed into a deer. His own hunting dogs caught his scent, and tore him apart.

Ovid's version of the myth of Actaeon differs from most earlier sources. Unlike earlier myths about Artemis, Actaeon is killed for an innocent mistake, glimpsing Diana bathing. An earlier variant of this myth, known as The Bath of Pallas, had the hunter intentionally spy on the bathing goddess Pallas (Athena), and earlier versions of the myth involving Artemis did not involve the bath at all.

== Worship in the classical period ==
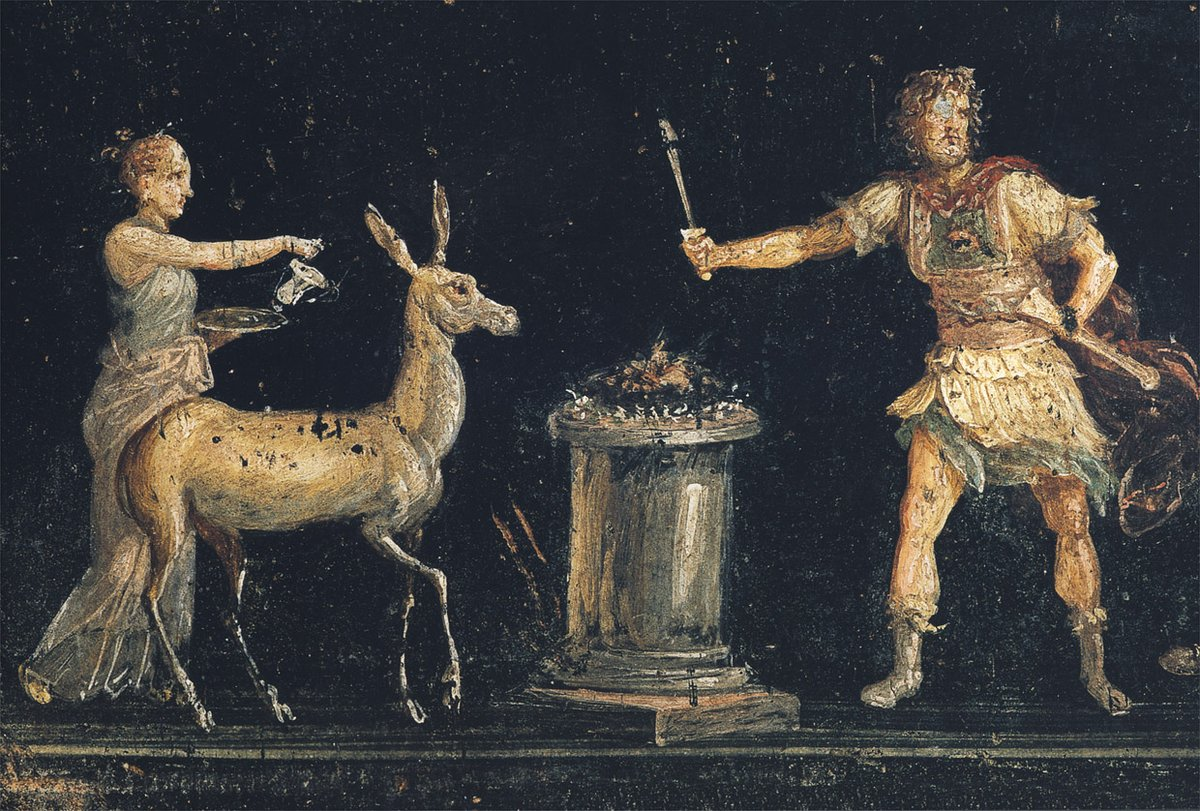
An ancient Fourth-Pompeian-Style Roman wall painting depicting a scene of sacrifice in honor of the goddess Diana; she is seen here accompanied by a deer. The fresco was discovered in the triclinium of House of the Vettii in Pompeii, Italy.

Diana was an ancient goddess common to all Latin tribes. Therefore, many sanctuaries were dedicated to her in the lands inhabited by Latins. Her primary sanctuary was a woodland grove overlooking Lake Nemi, a body of water also known as "Diana's Mirror", where she was worshiped as Diana Nemorensis, or "Diana of the Wood". In Rome, the cult of Diana may have been almost as old as the city itself. Varro mentions her in the list of deities to whom king Titus Tatius promised to build a shrine. His list included Luna and Diana Lucina as separate entities. Another testimony to the antiquity of her cult is to be found in the lex regia of King Tullus Hostilius that condemns those guilty of incest to the sacratio to Diana. She had a temple in Rome on the Aventine Hill, according to tradition dedicated by king Servius Tullius. Its location is remarkable as the Aventine is situated outside the pomerium, i.e. original territory of the city, in order to comply with the tradition that Diana was a goddess common to all Latins and not exclusively of the Romans. Being placed on the Aventine, and thus outside the pomerium, meant that Diana's cult essentially remained a foreign one, like that of Bacchus; she was never officially transferred to Rome as Juno was after the sack of Veii.

Other known sanctuaries and temples to Diana include Colle di Corne near Tusculum, where she is referred to with the archaic Latin name of deva Cornisca and where existed a collegium of worshippers; at Évora, Portugal; Mount Algidus, also near Tusculum; at Lavinium; and at Tibur (Tivoli), where she is referred to as Diana Opifera Nemorensis. Diana was also worshiped at a sacred wood mentioned by Livy – ad compitum Anagninum (near Anagni), and on Mount Tifata in Campania.

According to Plutarch, men and women alike were worshipers of Diana and were welcomed into all of her temples. The one exception seems to have been a temple on the Vicus Patricius, which men either did not enter due to tradition, or were not allowed to enter. Plutarch related a legend that a man had attempted to assault a woman worshiping in this temple and was killed by a pack of dogs (echoing the myth of Diana and Actaeon), which resulted in a superstition against men entering the temple.

A feature common to nearly all of Diana's temples and shrines by the second century CE was the hanging up of stag antlers. Plutarch noted that the only exception to this was the temple on the Aventine Hill, in which bull horns had been hung up instead. Plutarch explains this by way of reference to a legend surrounding the sacrifice of an impressive Sabine bull by King Servius at the founding of the Aventine temple.

=== Sanctuary at Lake Nemi ===
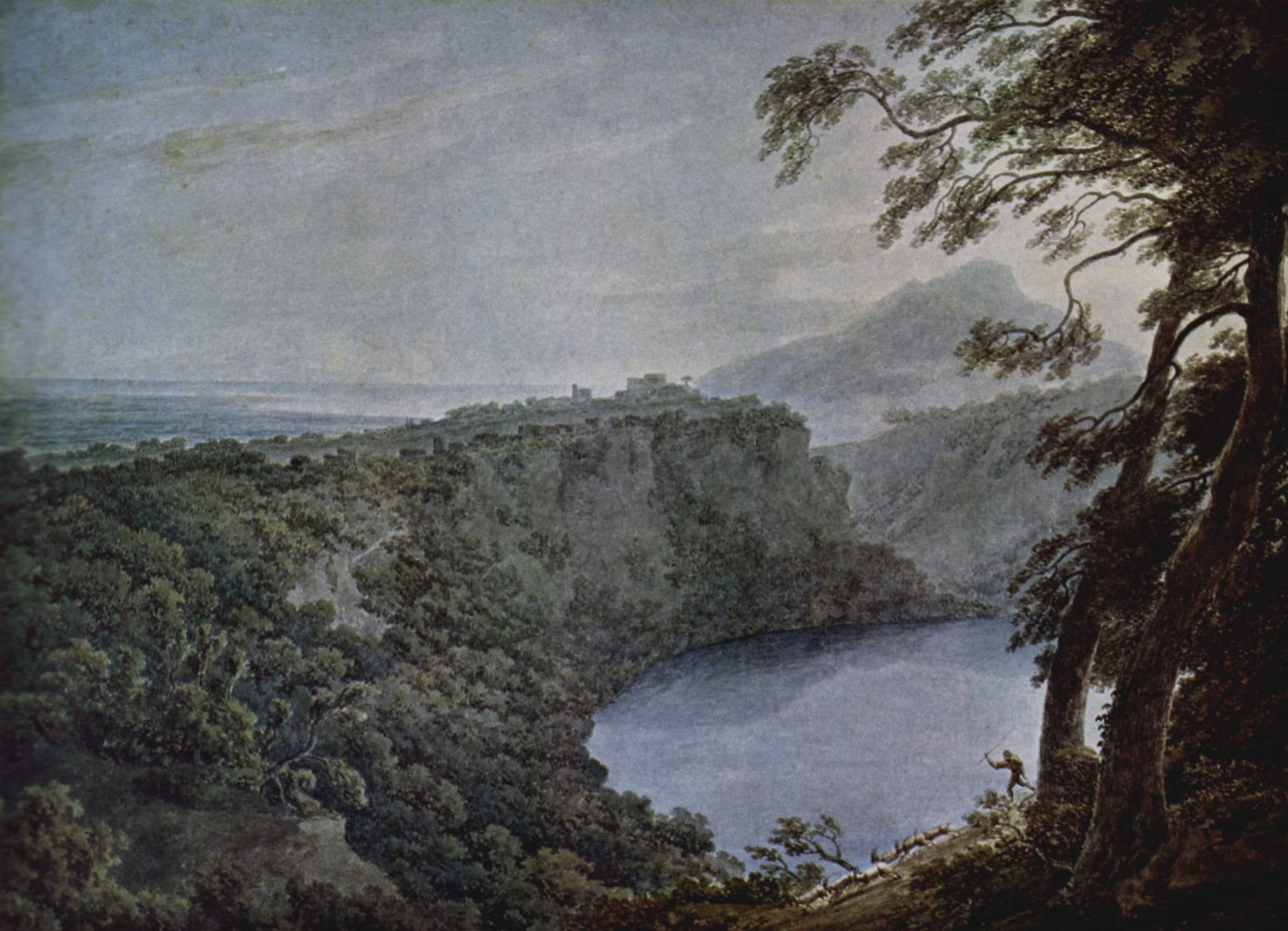
An 18th-century depiction of Lake Nemi as painted by John Robert Cozens

Diana's worship may have originated at an open-air sanctuary overlooking Lake Nemi in the Alban Hills near Aricia, where she was worshiped as Diana Nemorensis, or ("Diana of the Sylvan Glade"). According to legendary accounts, the sanctuary was founded by Orestes and Iphigenia after they fled from the Tauri. In this tradition, the Nemi sanctuary was supposedly built on the pattern of an earlier Temple of Artemis Tauropolos, and the first cult statue at Nemi was said to have been stolen from the Tauri and brought to Nemi by Orestes. Historical evidence suggests that worship of Diana at Nemi flourished from at least the 6th century BCE until the 2nd century CE. Her cult there was first attested in Latin literature by Cato the Elder, in a surviving quote by the late grammarian Priscian. By the 4th century BCE, the simple shrine at Nemi had been joined by a temple complex. The sanctuary served an important political role as it was held in common by the Latin League.

A festival to Diana, the Nemoralia, was held yearly at Nemi on the Ides of August (August 13–15). Worshippers traveled to Nemi carrying torches and garlands, and once at the lake, they left pieces of thread tied to fences and tablets inscribed with prayers. Diana's festival eventually became widely celebrated throughout Italy, which was unusual given the provincial nature of Diana's cult. The poet Statius wrote of the festival:

It is the season when the most scorching region of the heavens takes over the land and the keen dog-star Sirius, so often struck by Hyperion's sun, burns the gasping fields. Now is the day when Trivia's Arician grove, convenient for fugitive kings, grows smoky, and the lake, having guilty knowledge of Hippolytus, glitters with the reflection of a multitude of torches; Diana herself garlands the deserving hunting dogs and polishes the arrowheads and allows the wild animals to go in safety, and at virtuous hearths all Italy celebrates the Hecatean Ides.

— Statius Silv. 3.I.52–60

Statius describes the triple nature of the goddess by invoking heavenly (the stars), earthly (the grove itself) and underworld (Hecate) imagery. He also suggests by the garlanding of the dogs and polishing of the spears that no hunting was allowed during the festival.

Legend has it that Diana's high priest at Nemi, known as the Rex Nemorensis, was always an escaped slave who could only obtain the position by defeating his predecessor in a fight to the death. Sir James George Frazer wrote of this sacred grove in The Golden Bough, basing his interpretation on brief remarks in Strabo (5.3.12), Pausanias (2,27.24) and Servius' commentary on the Aeneid (6.136). The legend tells of a tree that stood in the center of the grove and was heavily guarded. No one was allowed to break off its limbs, with the exception of a runaway slave, who was allowed, if he could, to break off one of the boughs. He was then in turn granted the privilege to engage the Rex Nemorensis, the current king and priest of Diana, in a fight to the death. If the slave prevailed, he became the next king for as long as he could defeat his challengers. However, Joseph Fontenrose criticised Frazer's assumption that a rite of this sort actually occurred at the sanctuary, and no contemporary records exist that support the historical existence of the Rex Nemorensis.

=== Spread and conflation with Artemis ===
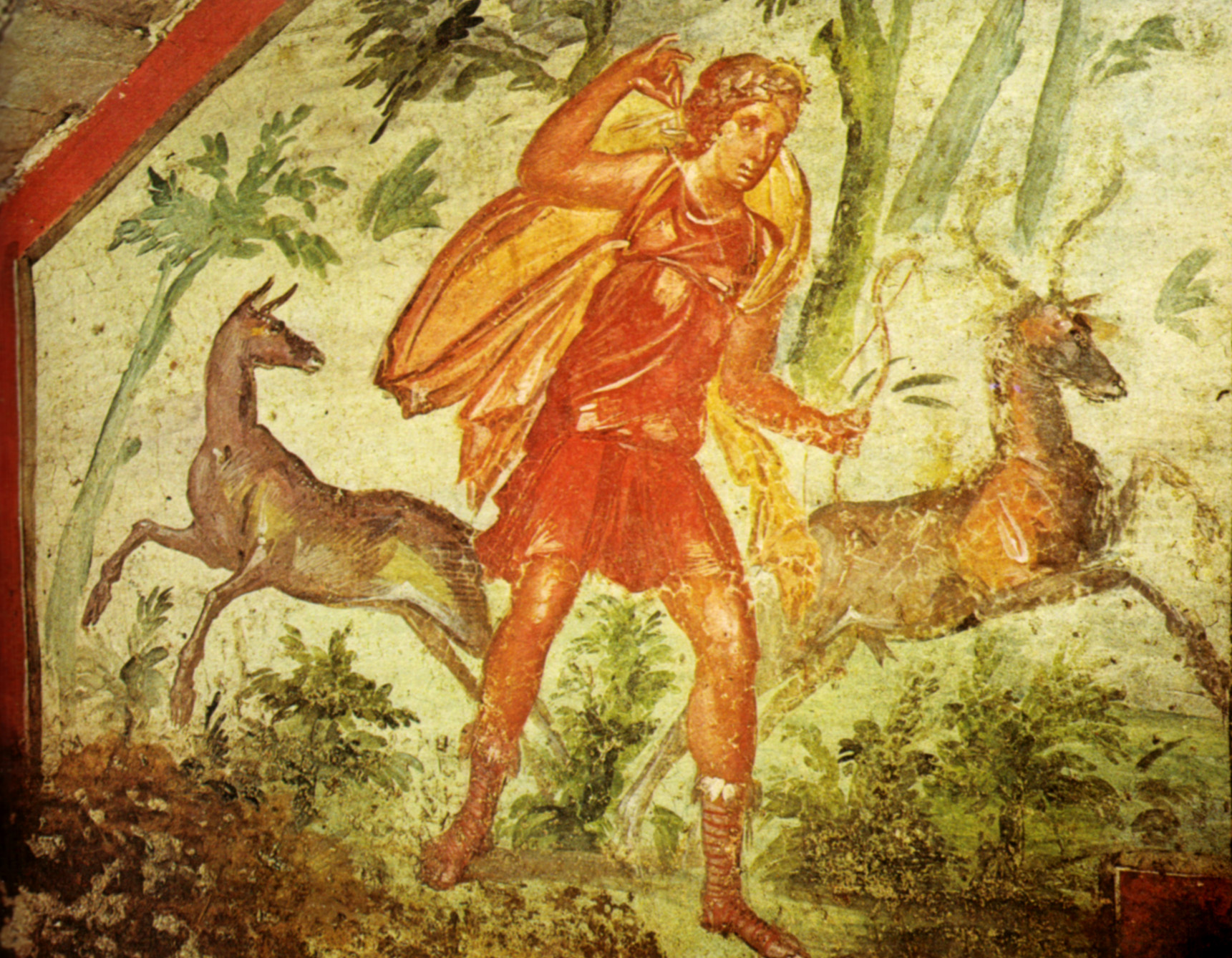
A Roman fresco depicting Diana hunting, 4th century CE, from the Via Livenza hypogeum in Rome

Rome hoped to unify into and control the Latin tribes around Nemi, so Diana's worship was imported to Rome as a show of political solidarity. Diana soon afterwards became Hellenized, and combined with the Greek goddess Artemis, "a process which culminated with the appearance of Diana beside Apollo [the brother of Artemis] in the first lectisternium at Rome" in 399 BCE. The process of identification between the two goddesses probably began when artists who were commissioned to create new religious statues for Diana's temples outside Nemi were struck by the similar attributes between Diana and the more familiar Artemis, and sculpted Diana in a manner inspired by previous depictions of Artemis. Sibyllene influence and trade with Massilia, where similar cult statues of Artemis existed, would have completed the process.

According to Françoise Hélène Pairault's study, historical and archaeological evidence point to the fact that the characteristics given to both Diana of the Aventine Hill and Diana Nemorensis were the product of the direct or indirect influence of the cult of Artemis, which was spread by the Phoceans among the Greek towns of Campania Cuma and Capua, who in turn had passed it over to the Etruscans and the Latins by the 6th and 5th centuries BCE.

Evidence suggests that a confrontation occurred between two groups of Etruscans who fought for supremacy, those from Tarquinia, Vulci and Caere (allied with the Greeks of Capua) and those of Clusium. This is reflected in the legend of the coming of Orestes to Nemi and of the inhumation of his bones in the Roman Forum near the temple of Saturn. The cult introduced by Orestes at Nemi is apparently that of the Artemis Tauropolos. The literary amplification reveals a confused religious background: different versions of Artemis were conflated under the epithet. As far as Nemi's Diana is concerned there are two different versions, by Strabo and Servius Honoratus. Strabo's version looks to be the most authoritative as he had access to first-hand primary sources on the sanctuaries of Artemis, i.e. the priest of Artemis Artemidoros of Ephesus. The meaning of Tauropolos denotes an Asiatic goddess with lunar attributes, lady of the herds. The only possible interpretatio graeca of high antiquity concerning Diana Nemorensis could have been the one based on this ancient aspect of a deity of light, master of wildlife. Tauropolos is an ancient epithet attached to Artemis, Hecate, and even Athena. According to the legend Orestes founded Nemi together with Iphigenia. At Cuma the Sybil is the priestess of both Phoibos and Trivia. Hesiod and Stesichorus tell the story according to which after her death Iphigenia was divinised under the name of Hecate, a fact which would support the assumption that Artemis Tauropolos had a real ancient alliance with the heroine, who was her priestess in Taurid and her human paragon. This religious complex is in turn supported by the triple statue of Artemis-Hecate.

In Rome, Diana was regarded with great reverence and was a patroness of lower-class citizens, called plebeians, as well as slaves, who could receive asylum in her temples. Georg Wissowa proposed that this might be because the first slaves of the Romans were Latins of the neighboring tribes. However, the Temple of Artemis at Ephesus had the same custom of the asylum.

=== In Rome ===
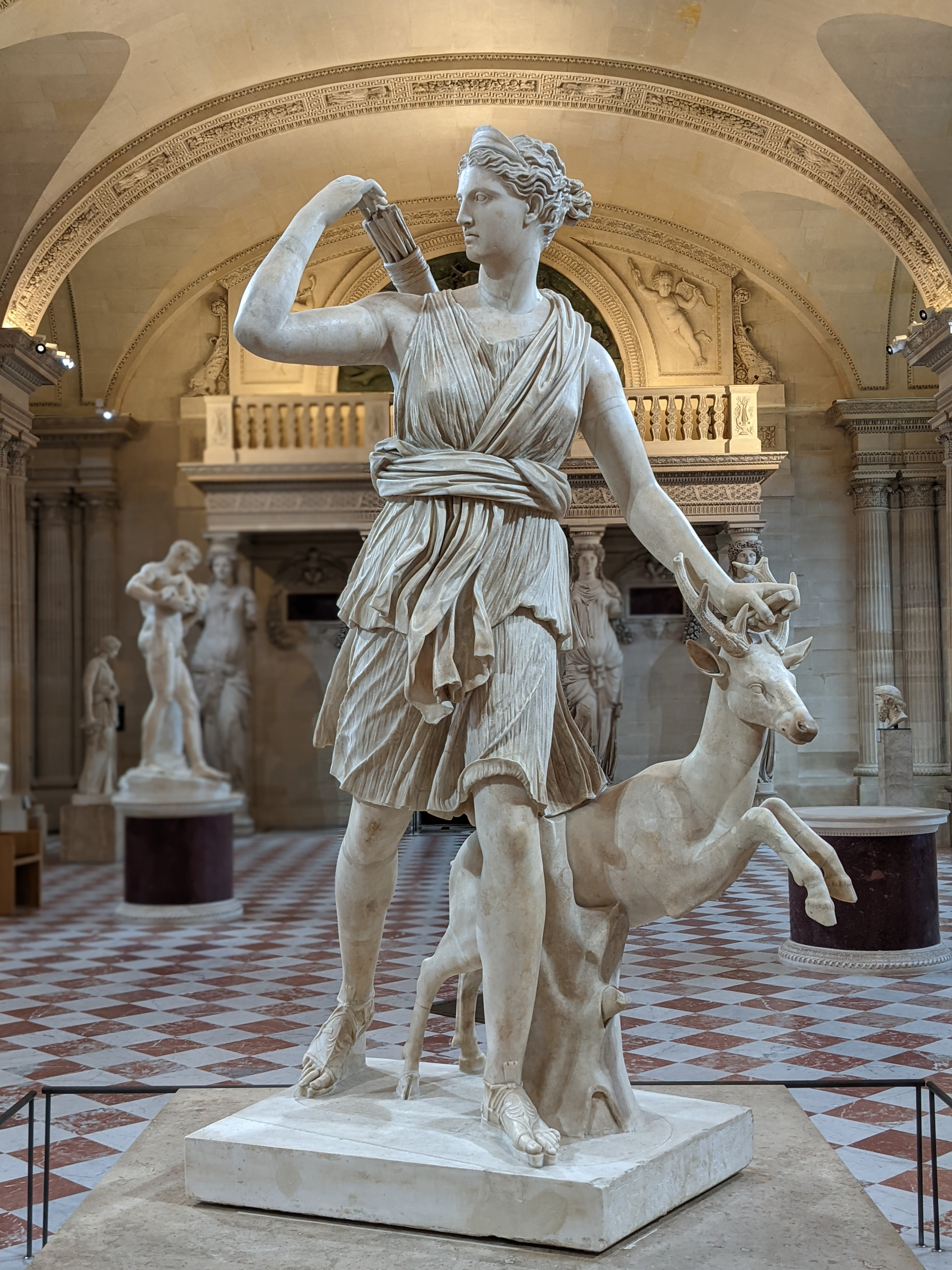
Diana of Versailles, a 2nd-century Roman version in the Greek tradition of iconography (Louvre Museum, Paris).

Worship of Diana probably spread into the city of Rome beginning around 550 BCE, during her Hellenization and combination with the Greek goddess Artemis. Diana was first worshiped along with her brother and mother, Apollo and Latona, in their temple in the Campus Martius, and later in the Temple of Apollo Palatinus.

The first major temple dedicated primarily to Diana in the vicinity of Rome was the Temple of Diana Aventina (Diana of the Aventine Hill). According to the Roman historian Livy, the construction of this temple began in the 6th century BCE and was inspired by stories of the massive Temple of Artemis at Ephesus, which was said to have been built through the combined efforts of all the cities of Asia Minor. Legend has it that Servius Tullius was impressed with this act of massive political and economic cooperation, and convinced the cities of the Latin League to work with the Romans to build their own temple to the goddess. However, there is no compelling evidence for such an early construction of the temple, and it is more likely that it was built in the 3rd century BCE, following the influence of the temple at Nemi, and probably about the same time the first temples to Vertumnus (who was associated with Diana) were built in Rome (264 BCE). The misconception that the Aventine Temple was inspired by the Ephesian Temple might originate in the fact that the cult images and statues used at the former were based heavily on those found in the latter. Whatever its initial construction date, records show that the Avantine Temple was rebuilt by Lucius Cornificius in 32 BCE. If it was still in use by the 4th century CE, the Aventine temple would have been permanently closed during the persecution of pagans in the late Roman Empire. Today, a short street named the Via del Tempio di Diana and an associated plaza, Piazza del Tempio di Diana, commemorates the site of the temple. Part of its wall is located within one of the halls of the Apuleius restaurant.

Later temple dedications often were based on the model for ritual formulas and regulations of the Temple of Diana. Roman politicians built several minor temples to Diana elsewhere in Rome to secure public support. One of these was built in the Campus Martius in 187 BCE; no Imperial period records of this temple have been found, and it is possible it was one of the temples demolished around 55 BCE in order to build a theater. Diana also had a public temple on the Quirinal Hill, the sanctuary of Diana Planciana. It was dedicated by Plancius in 55 BCE, though it is unclear which Plancius.

In their worship of Artemis, Greeks filled their temples with sculptures of the goddess created by well-known sculptors, and many were adapted for use in the worship of Diana by the Romans, beginning around the 2nd century BCE (the beginning of a period of strong Hellenistic influence on Roman religion). The earliest depictions of the Artemis of Ephesus are found on Ephesian coins from this period. By the Imperial period, small marble statues of the Ephesian Artemis were being produced in the Western region of the Mediterranean and were often bought by Roman patrons. The Romans obtained a large copy of an Ephesian Artemis statue for their temple on the Aventine Hill. Diana was usually depicted for educated Romans in her Greek guise. If she was shown accompanied by a deer, as in the Diana of Versailles, this is because Diana was the patroness of hunting. The deer may also offer a covert reference to the myth of Acteon (or Actaeon), who saw her bathing naked. Diana transformed Acteon into a stag and set his own hunting dogs to kill him.

=== At Mount Tifata ===
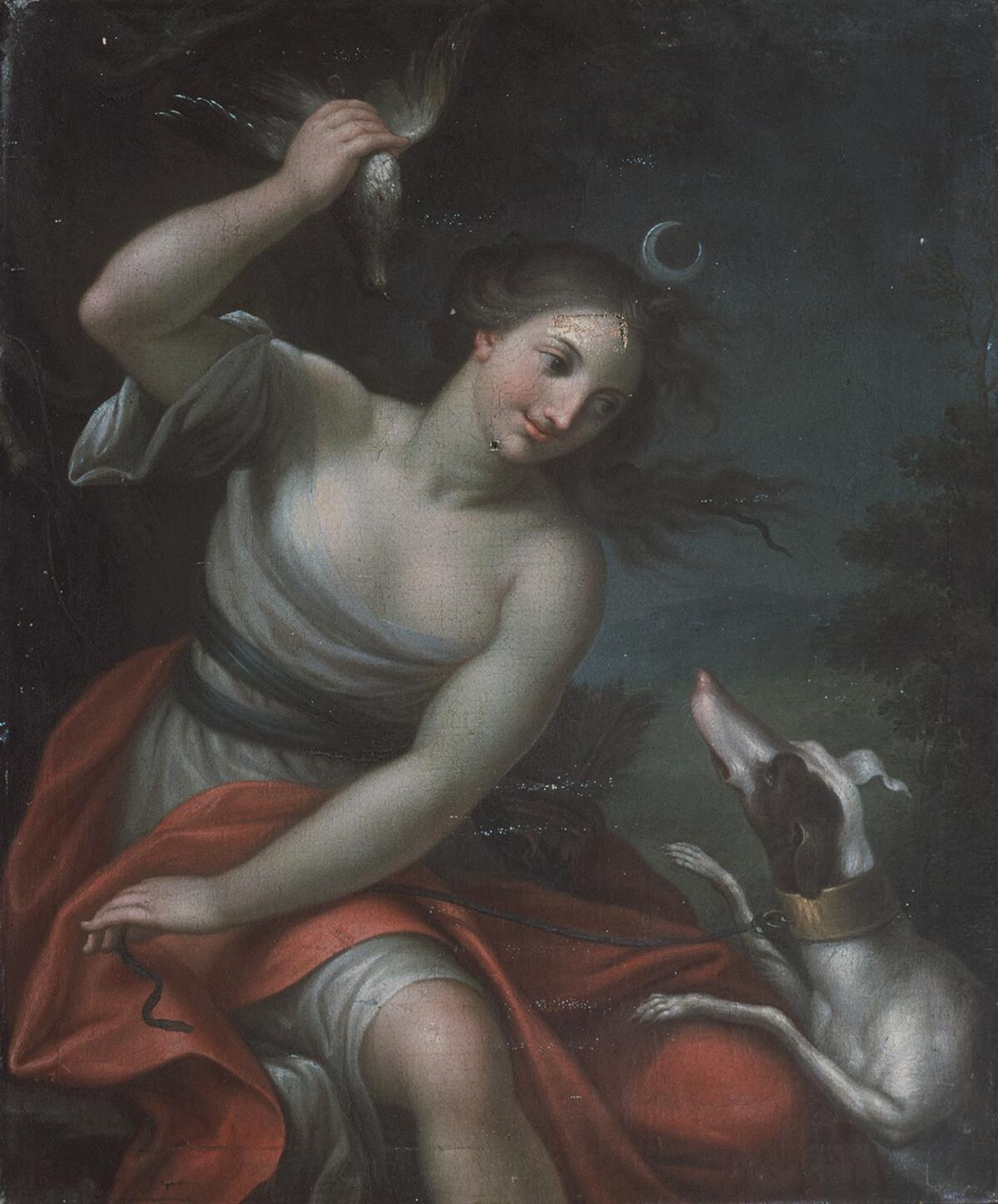
Diana and her hound, c. 1720

In Campania, Diana had a major temple at Mount Tifata, near Capua. She was worshiped there as Diana Tifatina. This was one of the oldest sanctuaries in Campania. As a rural sanctuary, it included lands and estates that would have been worked by slaves following the Roman conquest of Campania, and records show that expansion and renovation projects at her temple were funded in part by other conquests by Roman military campaigns. The modern Christian church of Sant'Angelo in Formis was built on the ruins of the Tifata temple.

=== Roman provinces ===
In the Roman provinces, Diana was widely worshiped alongside local deities. Over 100 inscriptions to Diana have been cataloged in the provinces, mainly from Gaul, Upper Germania, and Britannia. Diana was commonly invoked alongside another forest god, Silvanus, as well as other "mountain gods". In the provinces, she was occasionally conflated with local goddesses such as Abnoba, and was given high status, with Augusta and regina ("queen") being common epithets.

=== Household worship ===
Diana was not only regarded as a goddess of the wilderness and the hunt, but was often worshiped as a patroness of families. She served a similar function to the hearth goddess Vesta, and was sometimes considered to be a member of the Penates, the deities most often invoked in household rituals. In this role, she was often given a name reflecting the tribe of family who worshiped her and asked for her protection. For example, in what is now Wiesbaden, Diana was worshiped as Diana Mattiaca by the Mattiaci tribe. Other family-derived named attested in the ancient literature include Diana Cariciana, Diana Valeriana, and Diana Plancia. As a house goddess, Diana often became reduced in stature compared to her official worship by the Roman state religion. In personal or family worship, Diana was brought to the level of other household spirits, and was believed to have a vested interest in the prosperity of the household and the continuation of the family. The Roman poet Horace regarded Diana as a household goddess in his Odes, and had an altar dedicated to her in his villa where household worship could be conducted. In his poetry, Horace deliberately contrasted the kinds of grand, elevated hymns to Diana on behalf of the entire Roman state, the kind of worship that would have been typical at her Aventine temple, with a more personal form of devotion.

Images of Diana and her associated myths have been found on sarcophagi of wealthy Romans. They often included scenes depicting sacrifices to the goddess, and on at least one example, the deceased man is shown joining Diana's hunt.

== Theology ==
Since ancient times, philosophers and theologians have examined the nature of Diana in light of her worship traditions, attributes, mythology, and identification with other gods.

=== Conflation with other goddesses ===
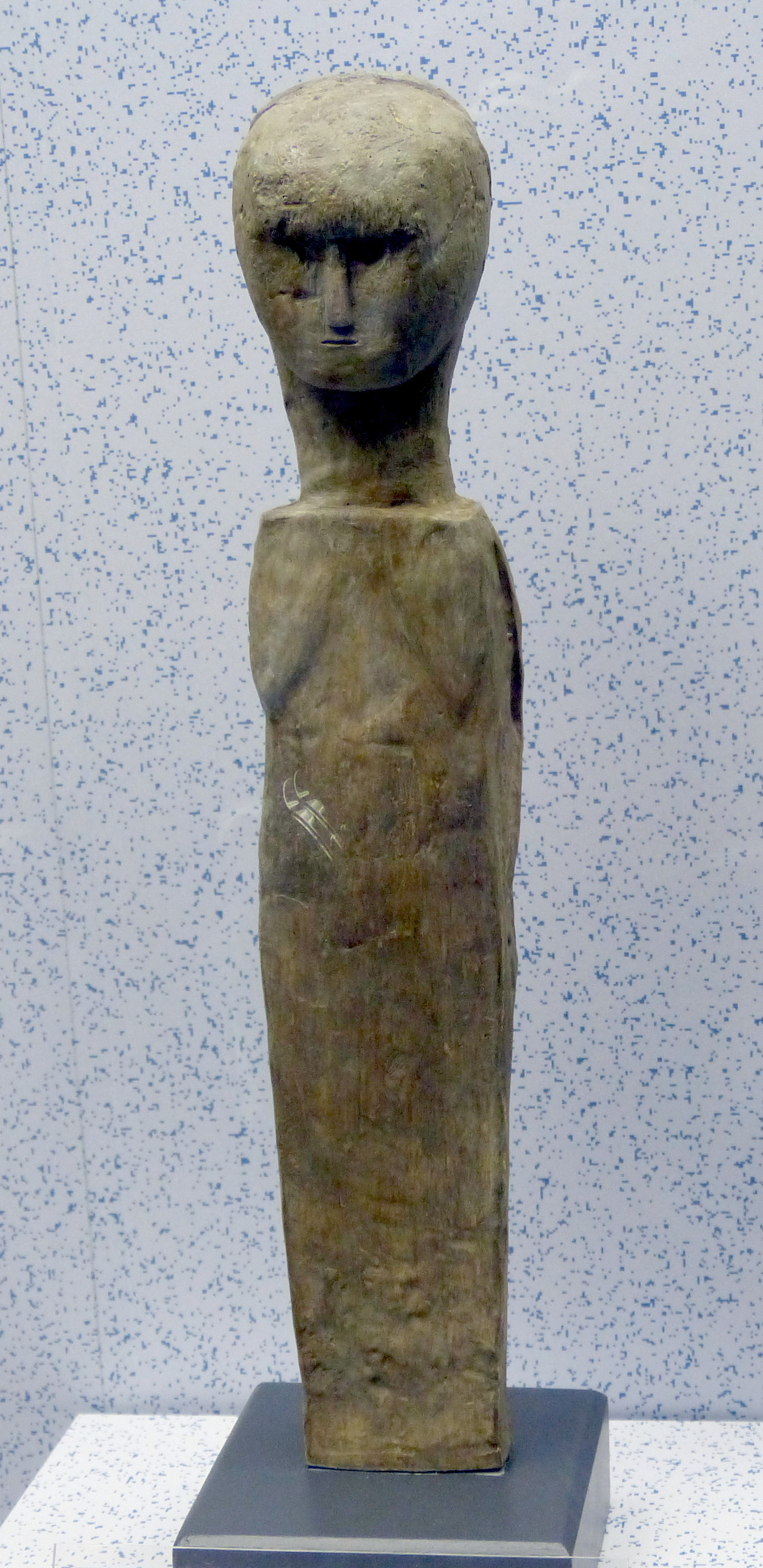
Wooden statue of Diana Abnoba, Museum for Prehistory in Thuringia

Diana was initially a hunting goddess and goddess of the local woodland at Nemi, but as her worship spread, she acquired attributes of other similar goddesses. As she became conflated with Artemis, she became a moon goddess, identified with the other lunar goddesses goddess Luna and Hekate. She also became the goddess of childbirth and ruled over the countryside. Catullus wrote a poem to Diana in which she has more than one alias: Latonia, Lucina, Juno, Trivia, Luna.

Along with Mars, Diana was often venerated at games held in Roman amphitheaters, and some inscriptions from the Danubian provinces show that she was conflated with Nemesis in this role, as Diana Nemesis.

Outside of Italy, Diana had important centers of worship where she was syncretised with similar local deities in Gaul, Upper Germania, and Britannia. Diana was particularly important in the region in and around the Black Forest, where she was conflated with the local goddess Abnoba and worshiped as Diana Abnoba.

Some late antique sources went even further, syncretizing many local "great goddesses" into a single "Queen of Heaven". The Platonist philosopher Apuleius, writing in the late 2nd century, depicted the goddess declaring:

"I come, Lucius, moved by your entreaties: I, mother of the universe, mistress of all the elements, first-born of the ages, highest of the gods, queen of the shades, first of those who dwell in heaven, representing in one shape all gods and goddesses. My will controls the shining heights of heaven, the health-giving sea-winds, and the mournful silences of hell; the entire world worships my single godhead in a thousand shapes, with divers rites, and under many a different name. The Phrygians, first-born of mankind, call me the Pessinuntian Mother of the gods; the native Athenians the Cecropian Minerva; the island-dwelling Cypriots Paphian Venus; the archer Cretans Dictynnan Diana; the triple-tongued Sicilians Stygian Proserpine; the ancient Eleusinians Actaean Ceres; some call me Juno, some Bellona, others Hecate, others Rhamnusia; but both races of Ethiopians, those on whom the rising and those on whom the setting sun shines, and the Egyptians who excel in ancient learning, honour me with the worship which is truly mine and call me by my true name: Queen Isis."

--Apuleius, translated by E. J. Kenny. The Golden Ass

Later poets and historians looked to Diana's identity as a triple goddess to merge her with triads heavenly, earthly, and underworld (cthonic) goddesses. Maurus Servius Honoratus said that the same goddess was called Luna in heaven, Diana on earth, and Proserpina in hell. Michael Drayton praises the Triple Diana in poem The Man in the Moone (1606): "So these great three most powerful of the rest, Phoebe, Diana, Hecate, do tell. Her sovereignty in Heaven, in Earth and Hell".

=== In Platonism ===
Based on the earlier writings of Plato, the Neoplatonist philosophers of late antiquity united the various major gods of Hellenic tradition into a series of monads containing within them triads, with some creating the world, some animating it or bringing it to life, and others harmonizing it. Within this system, Proclus considered Diana to be one of the primary animating, or life-giving, deities. Proclus, citing Orphic tradition, concludes that Diana "presides over all the generation in nature, and is the midwife of physical productive principles" and that she "extends these genitals, distributing as far as to subterranean natures the prolific power of [Bacchus]." Specifically, Proclus considered the life-generating principle of the highest order, within the Intellectual realm, to be Rhea, whom he identified with Ceres. Within her divinity was produced the cause of the basic principle of life. Projecting this principle into the lower, Hypercosmic realm of reality generated a lower monad, Kore, who could therefore be understood as Ceres' "daughter". Kore embodied the "maidenly" principle of generation that, more importantly, included a principle of division – where Demeter generates life indiscriminately, Kore distributes it individually. This division results in another triad or trinity, known as the Maidenly trinity, within the monad of Kore: namely, Diana, Proserpine, and Minerva, through whom individual living beings are given life and perfected. Specifically, according to a commentary by scholar Spyridon Rangos, Diana (equated with Hecate) gives existence, Proserpine (equated with "Soul") gives form, and Minerva (equated with "Virtue") gives intellect.

In his commentary on Proclus, the 19th century Platonist scholar Thomas Taylor expanded upon the theology of the classical philosophers, further interpreting the nature and roles of the gods in light of the whole body of Neoplatonist philosophy. He cites Plato in giving a three-form aspect to her central characteristic of virginity: the undefiled, the mundane, and the anagogic. Through the first form, Diana is regarded as a "lover of virginity". Through the second, she is the guardian of virtue. Through the third, she is considered to "hate the impulses arising from generation." Through the principle of the undefiled, Taylor suggests that she is given supremacy in Proclus' triad of life-giving or animating deities, and in this role the theurgists called her Hekate. In this role, Diana is granted undefiled power (Amilieti) from the other gods. This generative power does not proceed forth from the goddess (according to a statement by the Oracle of Delphi) but rather resides with her, giving her unparalleled virtue, and in this way she can be said to embody virginity. Later commentators on Proclus have clarified that the virginity of Diana is not an absence of sexual drive, but a renunciation of sexuality. Diana embodies virginity because she generates but precedes active fertility (within Neoplatonism, an important maxim is that "every productive cause is superior to the nature of the produced effect").

Using the ancient Neoplatonists as a basis, Taylor also commented on the triadic nature of Diana and related goddesses, and the ways in which they subsist within one another, partaking unevenly in each other's powers and attributes. For example, Kore is said to embody both Diana/Hecate and Minerva, who create the virtuous or virgin power within her, but also Proserpine (her sole traditional identification), through whom the generative power of the Kore as a whole is able to proceed forth into the world, where it joins with the demiurge to produce further deities, including Bacchus and "nine azure-eyed, flower-producing daughters".

Proclus also included Artemis/Diana in a second triad of deities, along with Ceres and Juno. According to Proclus:

"The life-generating triad begins with Demeter who engenders the entire encosmic life, namely intellectual life, psychic life and the life that is inseparable from body; Hera who brings forth the birth of soul occupies the cohering middle position (for the intellectual goddess outpours from herself all the processions of the psychic kinds); finally, Artemis has been assigned to the end of the trinity because she activates all the natural formative principles and perfects the self-completeness of matter; it is for this reason, namely because she supervises natural development and natural birth, that the theologians and Socrates in the Theaetetus call her Lochia."

Proclus pointed to the conflict between Hera and Artemis in the Illiad as a representation of the two kinds of human souls. Where Hera creates the higher, more cultured, or "worthy" souls, Artemis brings light to and perfects the "less worthy" or less rational. As explained by Ragnos (2000), "The aspect of reality which Artemis and Hera share, and because of which they engage in a symbolic conflict, is the engendering of life." Hera elevates rational living beings up to intellectual rational existence, whereas Artemis's power pertains to human life as far as its physical existence as a living thing. "Artemis deals with the most elementary forms of life or the most elementary part of all life, whereas Hera operates in the most elevated forms of life or the most elevated part of all life.

== Worship in post-Roman Europe ==
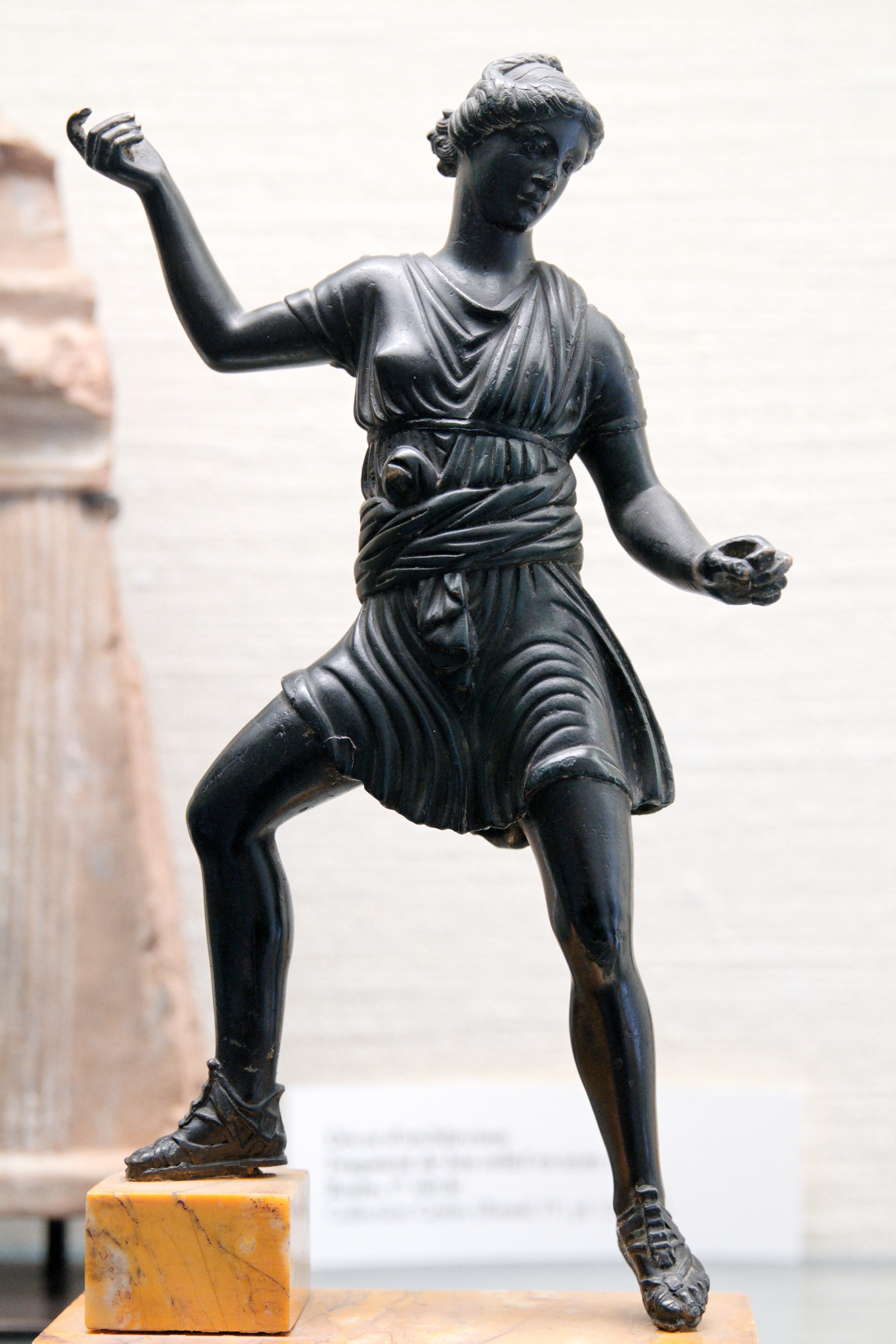
Gallo-Roman bronze statuette of Diana (latter 1st century)

Sermons and other religious documents have provided evidence for the worship of Diana during the Middle Ages. Though few details have been recorded, enough references to Diana worship during the early Christian period exist to give some indication that it may have been relatively widespread among remote and rural communities throughout Europe, and that such beliefs persisted into the Merovingian period. References to contemporary Diana worship exist from the 6th century on the Iberian peninsula and what is now southern France, though more detailed accounts of Dianic cults were given for the Low Countries, and southern Belgium in particular. Many of these were probably local goddesses, and wood nymphs or dryads, which had been conflated with Diana by Christian writers Latinizing local names and traditions.

=== In the Low Countries ===
The 6th century bishop Gregory of Tours reported meeting with a deacon named Vulfilaic (also known as Saint Wulflaicus or Walfroy the Stylite), who founded a hermitage on a hill in what is now Margut, France. On the same hill, he found "an image of Diana which the unbelieving people worshiped as a god." According to Gregory's report, worshipers would also sing chants in Diana's honor as they drank and feasted. Vulfilaic destroyed a number of smaller pagan statues in the area, but the statue of Diana was too large. After converting some of the local population to Christianity, Vulfilaic and a group of local residents attempted to pull the large statue down the mountain in order to destroy it, but failed, as it was too large to be moved. In Vulfilaic's account, after praying for a miracle, he was then able to single-handedly pull down the statue, at which point he and his group smashed it to dust with their hammers. According to Vulfilaic, this incident was quickly followed by an outbreak of pimples or sores that covered his entire body, which he attributed to demonic activity and similarly cured via what he described as a miracle. Vulfilaic would later found a church on the site, which is today known as Mont Saint-Walfroy.

Additional evidence for surviving pagan practices in the Low Countries region comes from the Vita Eligii, or "Life of Saint Eligius", written by Audoin in the 7th century. Audoin drew together the familiar admonitions of Eligius to the people of Flanders. In his sermons, he denounced "pagan customs" that the people continued to follow. In particular, he denounced several Roman gods and goddesses alongside Druidic mythological beliefs and objects:

"I denounce and contest, that you shall observe no sacrilegious pagan customs. For no cause or infirmity should you consult magicians, diviners, sorcerers or incantators. ..Do not observe auguries ... No influence attaches to the first work of the day or the [phase of the] moon. ... [Do not] make vetulas, little deer or iotticos or set tables at night or exchange New Year gifts or supply superfluous drinks... No Christian... performs solestitia or dancing or leaping or diabolical chants. No Christian should presume to invoke the name of a demon, not Neptune or Orcus or Diana or Minerva or Geniscus... No one should observe Jove's day in idleness. ... No Christian should make or render any devotion to the gods of the trivium, where three roads meet, to the fanes or the rocks, or springs or groves or corners. None should presume to hang any phylacteries from the neck of man nor beast. ..None should presume to make lustrations or incantations with herbs, or to pass cattle through a hollow tree or ditch ... No woman should presume to hang amber from her neck or call upon Minerva or other ill-starred beings in their weaving or dyeing. ... None should call the sun or moon lord or swear by them. ... No one should tell fate or fortune or horoscopes by them as those do who believe that a person must be what he was born to be."

Legends from medieval Belgium concern a natural spring which came to be known as the "Fons Remacli", a location which may have been home to late-surviving worship of Diana. Remacle was a monk appointed by Eligius to head a monastery at Solignac, and he is reported to have encountered Diana worship in the area around the river Warche. The population in this region was said to have been involved in the worship of "Diana of the Ardennes" (a syncretism of Diana and the Celtic goddess Arduinna), with effigies and "stones of Diana" used as evidence of pagan practices. Remacle believed that demonic entities were present in the spring, and had caused it to run dry. He performed an exorcism of the water source, and installed a lead pipe, which allowed the water to flow again.

=== The "Society of Diana" ===
Diana is the only pagan goddess mentioned by name in the New Testament (only in some Bible versions of Acts 19; many other Bibles refer to her as Artemis instead). In the Middle Ages, legends of night-time processions of spirits led by a female figure are recorded in the church records of Northern Italy, western Germany, and southern France. The spirits were said to enter houses and consume food which then miraculously re-appeared. They would sing and dance, and dispense advice regarding healing herbs and the whereabouts of lost objects. If the house was in good order, they would bring fertility and plenty. If not, they would bring curses to the family. Some women reported participating in these processions while their bodies still lay in bed. Historian Carlo Ginzburg has referred to these legendary spirit gatherings as "The Society of Diana".

Local clergy complained that women believed they were following Diana or Herodias, riding out on appointed nights to join the processions or carry out instructions from the goddess. The earliest reports of these legends appear in the writings of Regino of Prüm in the year 899, followed by many additional reports and variants of the legend in documents by Ratherius and others. By 1310, the names of the goddess figures attached to the legend were sometimes combined as Herodiana. It is likely that the clergy of this time used the identification of the procession's leader as Diana or Herodias in order to fit an older folk belief into a Biblical framework, as both are featured and demonized in the New Testament. Herodias was often conflated with her daughter Salome in legend, which also holds that, upon being presented with the severed head of John the Baptist, she was blown into the air by wind from the saint's mouth, through which she continued to wander for eternity. Diana was often conflated with Hecate, a goddess associated with the spirits of the dead and with witchcraft. These associations, and the fact that both figures are attested to in the Bible, made them a natural fit for the leader of the ghostly procession. Clergy used this identification to assert that the spirits were evil, and that the women who followed them were inspired by demons. As was typical of this time period, though pagan beliefs and practices were near eliminated from Europe, the clergy and other authorities still treated paganism as a real threat, in part thanks to biblical influence; much of the Bible had been written when various forms of paganism were still active if not dominant, so medieval clergy applied the same kinds of warnings and admonitions for any non-standard folk beliefs and practices they encountered. Based on analysis of church documents and parishioner confessions, it is likely that the spirit identified by the Church as Diana or Herodias was called by names of pre-Christian figures like Holda (a Germanic goddess of the winter solstice), or with names referencing her bringing of prosperity, like the Latin Abundia (meaning "plenty"), Satia (meaning "full" or "plentiful") and the Italian Richella (meaning "rich"). Some of the local titles for her, such as bonae res (meaning "good things"), are similar to late classical titles for Hecate, like bona dea. This might indicate a cultural mixture of medieval folk ideas with holdovers from earlier pagan belief systems. Whatever her true origin, by the 13th century, the leader of the legendary spirit procession had come to be firmly identified with Diana and Herodias through the influence of the Church.

== Modern development and folklore ==
=== The Golden Bough ===
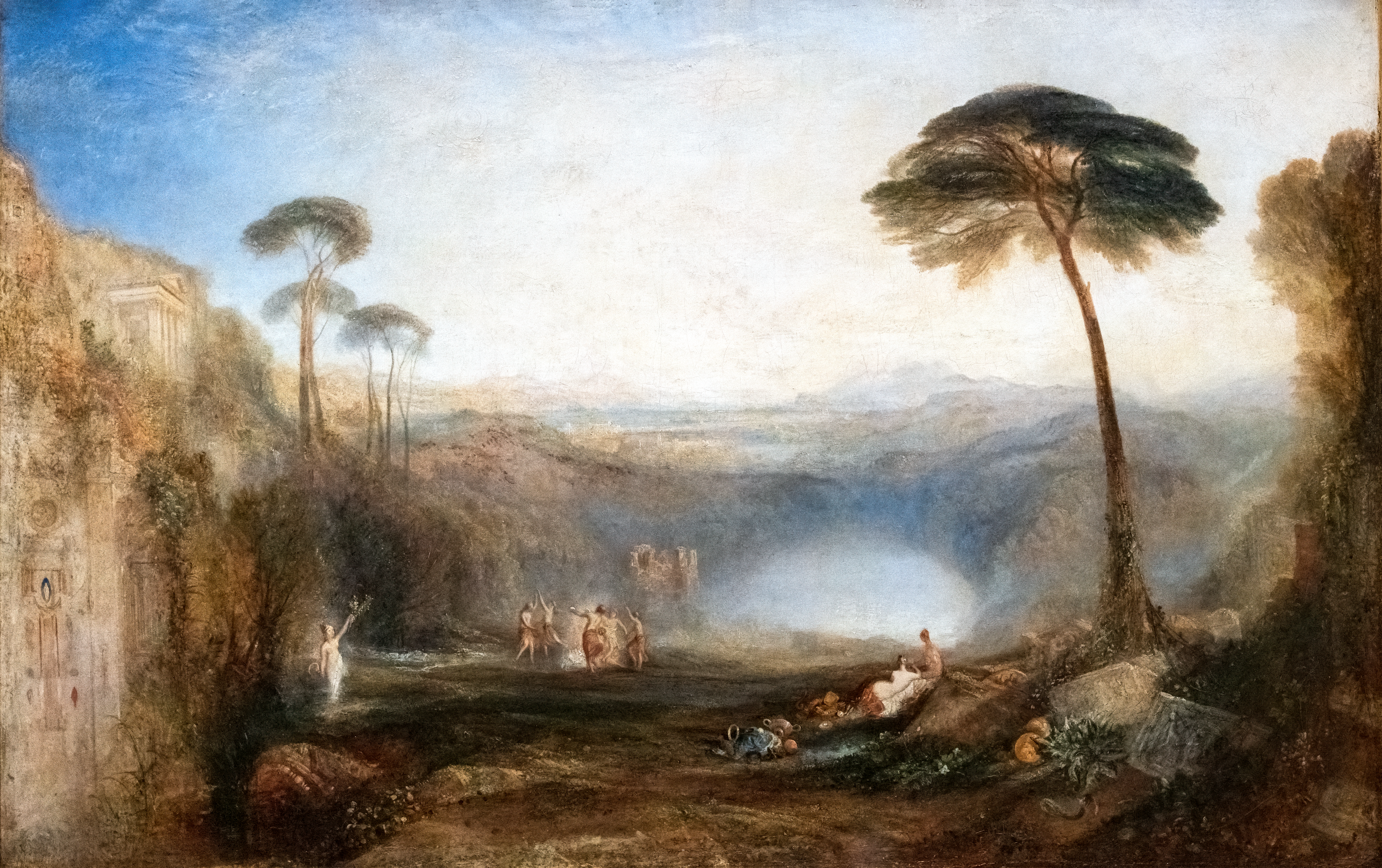
J. M. W. Turner's 1834 painting of the Golden Bough incident in the Aeneid

In his wide-ranging, comparative study of mythology and religion, The Golden Bough, anthropologist James George Frazer drew on various lines of evidence to re-interpret the legendary rituals associated with Diana at Nemi, particularly that of the rex Nemorensis. Frazer developed his ideas in relation to J. M. W. Turner's painting, also titled The Golden Bough, depicting a dream-like vision of the woodland lake of Nemi. According to Frazer, the rex Nemorensis or king at Nemi was the incarnation of a dying and reviving god, a solar deity who participated in a mystical marriage to a goddess. He died at the harvest and was reincarnated in the spring. Frazer claimed that this motif of death and rebirth is central to nearly all of the world's religions and mythologies. In Frazer's theory, Diana functioned as a goddess of fertility and childbirth, who, assisted by the sacred king, ritually returned life to the land in spring. The king in this scheme served not only as a high priest but as a god of the grove. Frazer identifies this figure with Virbius, of which little is known, but also with Jupiter via an association with sacred oak trees. Frazer argued furthermore that Jupiter and Juno were simply duplicate names of Jana and Janus; that is, Diana and Dianus, all of whom had identical functions and origins.

Frazer's speculatively reconstructed folklore of Diana's origins and the nature of her cult at Nemi were not well received even by his contemporaries. Godfrey Lienhardt noted that even during Frazer's lifetime, other anthropologists had "for the most part distanced themselves from his theories and opinions", and that the lasting influence of The Golden Bough and Frazer's wider body of work "has been in the literary rather than the academic world." Robert Ackerman wrote that, for anthropologists, Frazer is "an embarrassment" for being "the most famous of them all" and that most distance themselves from his work. While The Golden Bough achieved wide "popular appeal" and exerted a "disproportionate" influence "on so many [20th century] creative writers", Frazer's ideas played "a much smaller part" in the history of academic social anthropology.

=== The Gospel of the Witches ===
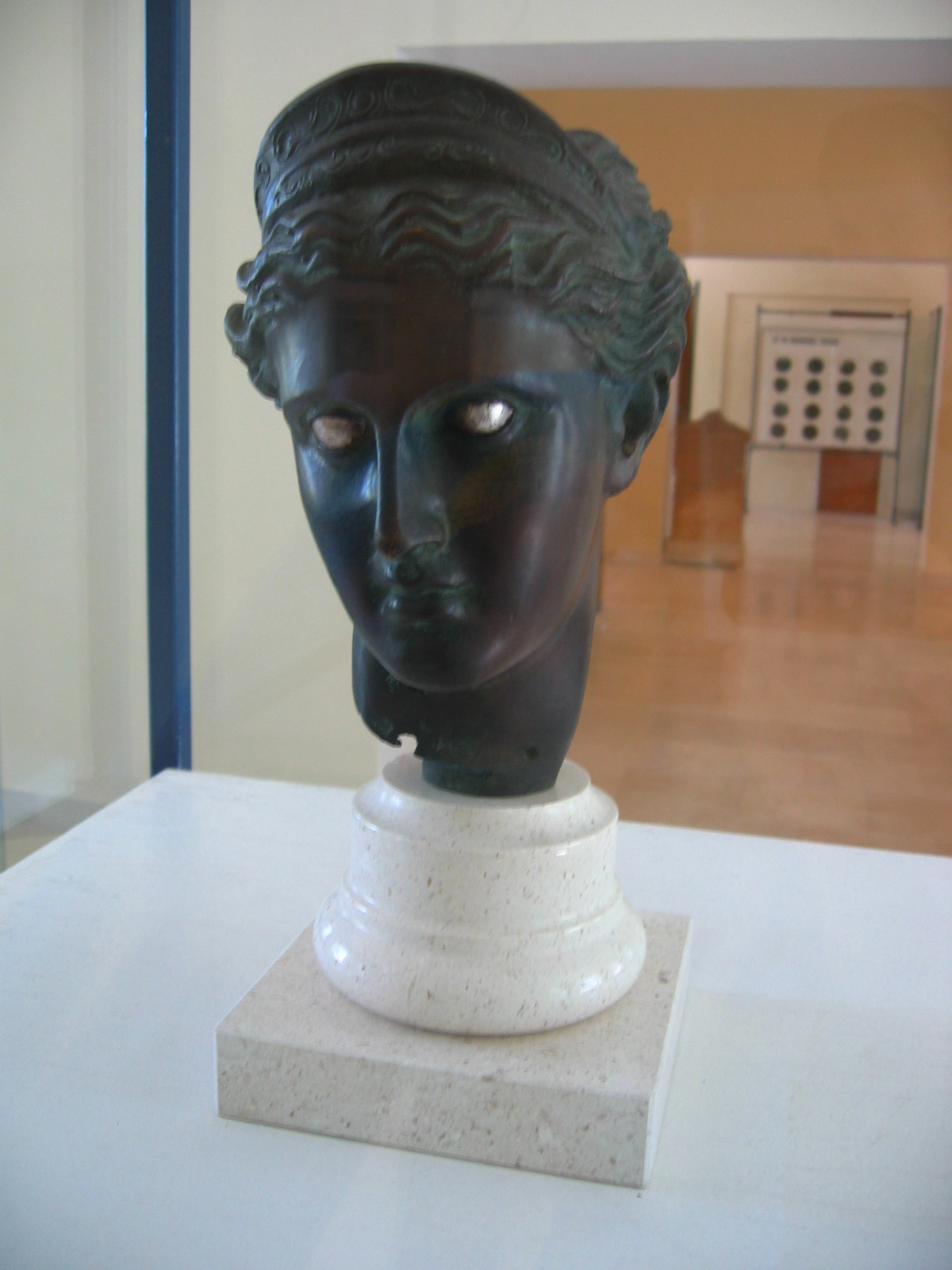
4th-century BCE Praxitelean bronze head of a goddess wearing a lunate crown, found at Issa (Vis, Croatia)

Folk legends like the Society of Diana, which linked the goddess to forbidden gatherings of women with spirits, may have influenced later works of folklore. One of these is Charles Godfrey Leland's Aradia, or the Gospel of the Witches, which prominently featured Diana at the center of an Italian witch-cult. In Leland's interpretation of supposed Italian folk witchcraft, Diana is considered Queen of the Witches. In this belief system, Diana is said to have created the world of her own being having in herself the seeds of all creation yet to come. It was said that out of herself she divided the darkness and the light, keeping for herself the darkness of creation and creating her brother Lucifer. Diana was believed to have loved and ruled with her brother, and with him bore a daughter, Aradia (a name likely derived from Herodias), who leads and teaches the witches on earth.

Leland's claim that Aradia represented an authentic tradition from an underground witch-cult, which had secretly worshiped Diana since ancient times has been dismissed by most scholars of folklore, religion, and medieval history. After the 1921 publication of Margaret Murray's The Witch-cult in Western Europe, which hypothesized that the European witch trials were actually a persecution of a pagan religious survival, American sensationalist author Theda Kenyon's 1929 book Witches Still Live connected Murray's thesis with the witchcraft religion in Aradia. Arguments against Murray's thesis would eventually include arguments against Leland. Witchcraft scholar Jeffrey Russell devoted some of his 1980 book A History of Witchcraft: Sorcerers, Heretics and Pagans to arguing against the claims Leland presented in Aradia. Historian Elliot Rose's A Razor for a Goat dismissed Aradia as a collection of incantations unsuccessfully attempting to portray a religion. In his book Triumph of the Moon, historian Ronald Hutton doubted not only of the existence of the religion that Aradia claimed to represent, and that the traditions Leland presented were unlike anything found in actual medieval literature, but also of the existence of Leland's sources, arguing that it is more likely that Leland created the entire story than that Leland could be so easily "duped". Religious scholar Chas S. Clifton took exception to Hutton's position, writing that it amounted to an accusation of "serious literary fraud" made by an "argument from absence".

=== Modern worship ===
Because Leland's claims about an Italian witch-cult are questionable, the first verifiable worship of Diana in the modern age was probably begun by Wicca. The earliest known practitioners of Neopagan witchcraft were members of a tradition begun by Gerald Gardner. Published versions of the devotional materials used by Gardner's group, dated to 1949, are heavily focused on the worship of Aradia, the daughter of Diana in Leland's folklore. Diana herself was recognized as an aspect of a single "great goddess" in the tradition of Apuleius, as described in the Wiccan Charge of the Goddess (itself adapted from Leland's text). Some later Wiccans, such as Scott Cunningham, would replace Aradia with Diana as the central focus of worship.

In the early 1960s, Victor Henry Anderson founded the Feri Tradition, a form of Wicca that draws from both Charles Leland's folklore and the Gardnerian tradition. Anderson claimed that he had first been initiated into a witchcraft tradition as a child in 1926, and that he had been told the name of the goddess worshiped by witches was Tana. The name Tana originated in Leland's Aradia, where he claimed it was an old Etruscan name for Diana. The Feri Tradition founded by Anderson continues to recognize Tana/Diana as an aspect of the Star Goddess related to the element of fire, and representing "the fiery womb that gives birth to and transforms all matter." (In Aradia, Diana is also credited as the creatrix of the material world and Queen of Faeries).

A few Wiccan traditions would elevate Diana to a more prominent position of worship, and there are two distinct modern branches of Wicca focused primarily on Diana. The first, founded during the early 1970s in the United States by Morgan McFarland and Mark Roberts, has a feminist theology and only occasionally accepts male participants, and leadership is limited to female priestesses. McFarland Dianic Wiccans base their tradition primarily on the work of Robert Graves and his book The White Goddess, and were inspired by references to the existence of medieval European "Dianic cults" in Margaret Murray's book The Witch-Cult in Western Europe. The second Dianic tradition, founded by Zsuzsanna Budapest in the mid-1970s, is characterized by an exclusive focus on the feminine aspect of the divine, and as a result is exclusively female. This tradition combines elements from British Traditional Wicca, Italian folk-magic based on the work of Charles Leland, feminist values, and healing practices drawn from a variety of different cultures.

A third Neopagan tradition heavily inspired by the worship of Diana through the lens of Italian folklore is Stregheria, founded in the 1980s. It centers around a pair of deities regarded as divine lovers, who are known by several variant names including Diana and Dianus, alternately given as Tana and Tanus or Jana and Janus (the later two deity names were mentioned by James Frazer in The Golden Bough as later corruptions of Diana and Dianus, which themselves were alternate and possibly older names for Juno and Jupiter). The tradition was founded by author Raven Grimassi, and influenced by Italian folktales he was told by his mother. One such folktale describes the moon being impregnated by her lover the morning star, a parallel to Leland's mythology of Diana and her lover Lucifer.

Diana was also a subject of worship in certain Feraferian rites, particularly those surrounding the autumnal equinox, beginning in 1967.

== Legacy ==
=== In language ===
Both the Romanian words for "fairy" Zână and Sânziană, the Leonese and Portuguese word for "water nymph" xana, and the Spanish word for "shooting target" and "morning call" (diana) seem to come from the name of Diana.

=== In the arts ===
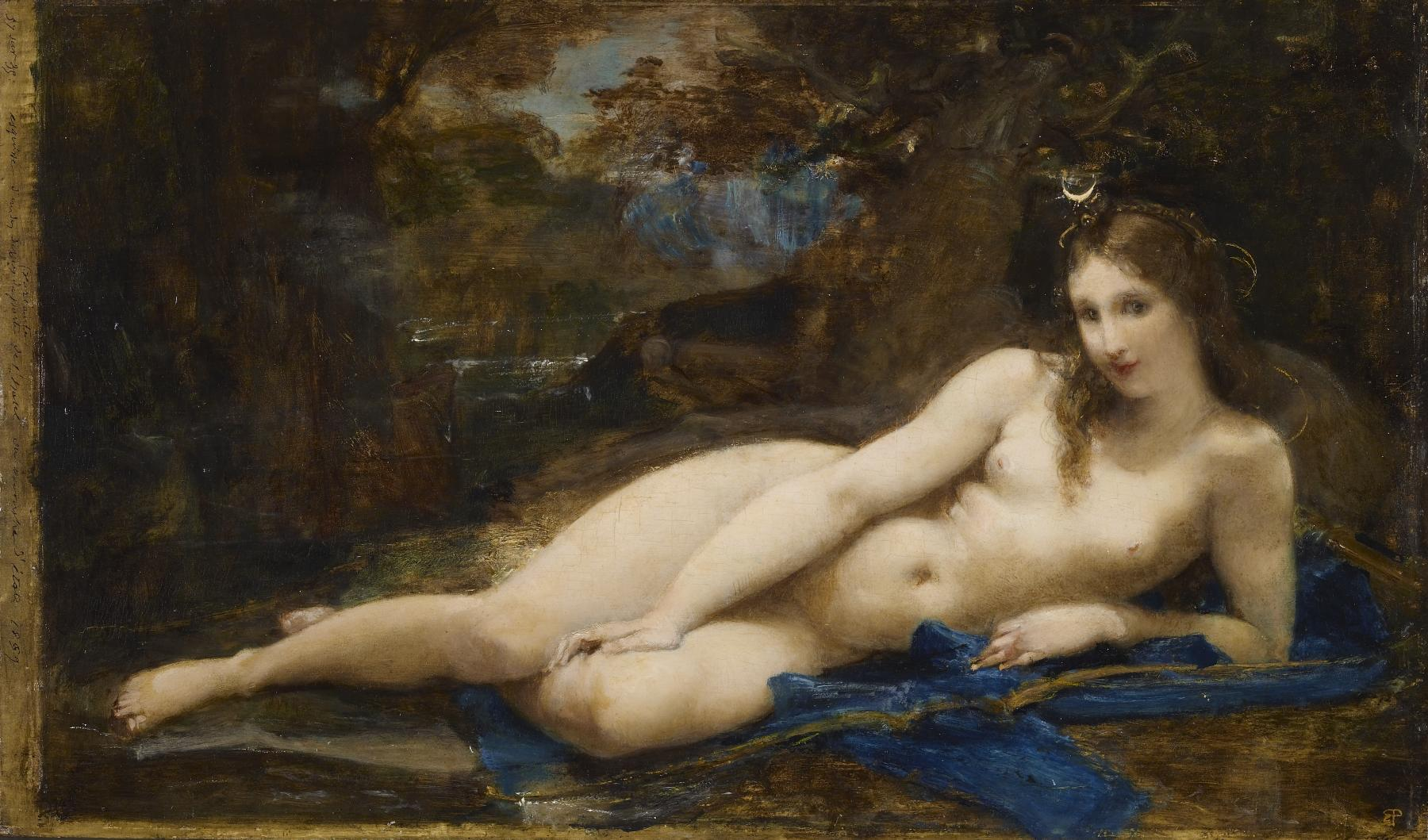
Diana Reposing by Paul-Jacques-Aimé Baudry. The nude goddess, identified by the crescent moon in her hair and the bow and quiver at her side, reclines on a blue drapery.

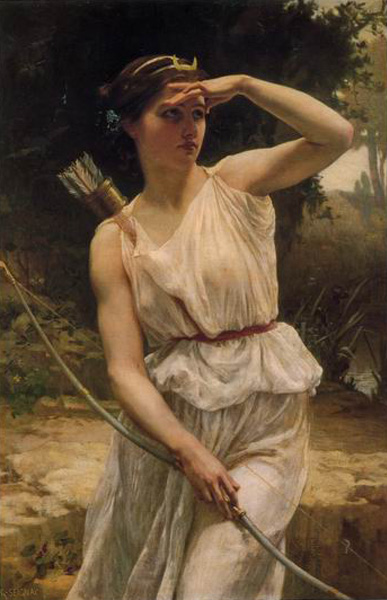
Diana Hunting, Guillaume Seignac

Since the Renaissance, Diana's myths have often been represented in the visual and dramatic arts, including the opera L'arbore di Diana. In the 16th century, Diana's image figured prominently at the châteaus of Fontainebleau, Chenonceau, and at Anet, in deference to Diane de Poitiers, mistress of Henri of France. At Versailles she was incorporated into the Olympian iconography with which Louis XIV, the Apollo-like "Sun King" liked to surround himself. Diana is also a character in the 1876 Léo Delibes ballet Sylvia. The plot deals with Sylvia, one of Diana's nymphs and sworn to chastity, and Diana's assault on Sylvia's affections for the shepherd Amyntas.

==== In literature ====
- Diana Soren, the main character in Carlos Fuentes' novel Diana o la cazadora soltera (Diana, or The Lone Huntress), is described as having the same personality as the goddess.
- In Jonathan Swift's poem: "The Progress of Beauty", as goddess of the moon, Diana is used in comparison to the 17th/early 18th century everyday woman Swift satirically writes about. Starts: 'When first Diana leaves her bed...'
- In Geoffrey of Monmouth's Historia Regum Britanniae ("History of the Kings of Britain"), Diana leads the Trojan Brutus to Britain, where he and his people settle.
- Diana is the principal character in the children's BBC television series The Moon Stallion by Brian Hayles (1978); Diana is played by the actress Sarah Sutton.
- In Rick Riordan's Camp Half-Blood Chronicles, Diana acts as the Roman incarnation of Artemis, although she does not appear until The Tyrant's Tomb. Throughout The Heroes of Olympus, along with the other gods, Artemis is split between her Greek and Roman incarnations. In The Tyrant's Tomb, Apollo summons his sister for help against Tarquin and his undead army. Diana appears with the Hunters of Artemis to slay Tarquin and his army and she heals Apollo's wounds before departing again.

In Shakespeare

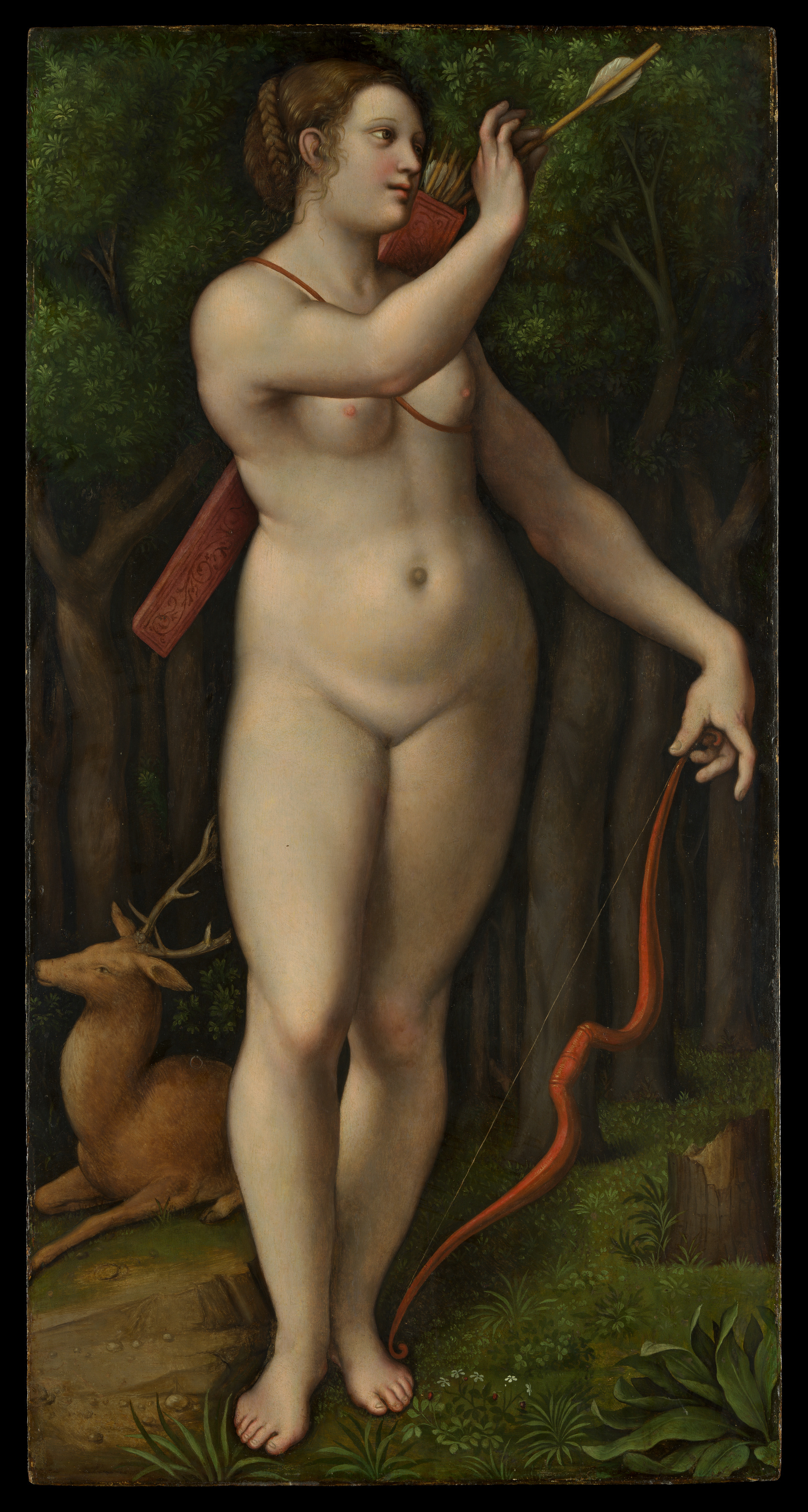
Diana as the Huntress, by Giampietrino

- In Shakespeare's Pericles, Prince of Tyre Diana appears to Pericles in a vision, telling him to go to her temple and tell his story to her followers.
- In All's Well That Ends Well Diana appears as a figure in the play and Helena makes multiple allusions to her, such as, "Now, Dian, from thy altar do I fly..." and "...wish chastely and love dearly, that your Dian/was both herself and love..." The Steward also says, "...; Dian no queen of virgins,/ that would suffer her poor knight surprised, without/ rescue in the first assault or ransom afterward." It can be assumed that 'Dian' is simply a shortening of 'Diana' since later in the play when Parolles' letter to Diana is read aloud it reads 'Dian'.

In games and comics

- The character of Diana from the video game League of Legends is largely based on the goddess.
- William Moulton Marston drew from the Diana archetype as an allegorical basis for Wonder Woman's proper name, Princess Diana for DC Comics. Most versions of Wonder Woman's origin story state that she is given the name Diana because her mother Hippolyte was inspired by the goddess of the moon that Diana was born under.
- Diana also is one of the primary gods in the video game Ryse.
- In the manga and anime series Sailor Moon, Diana is the feline companion to Chibiusa, Usagi's daughter. Diana is the daughter of Artemis and Luna. All of these characters are advisers to rulers of the kingdom of the moon and therefore have moon-associated names.

==== In painting and sculpture ====
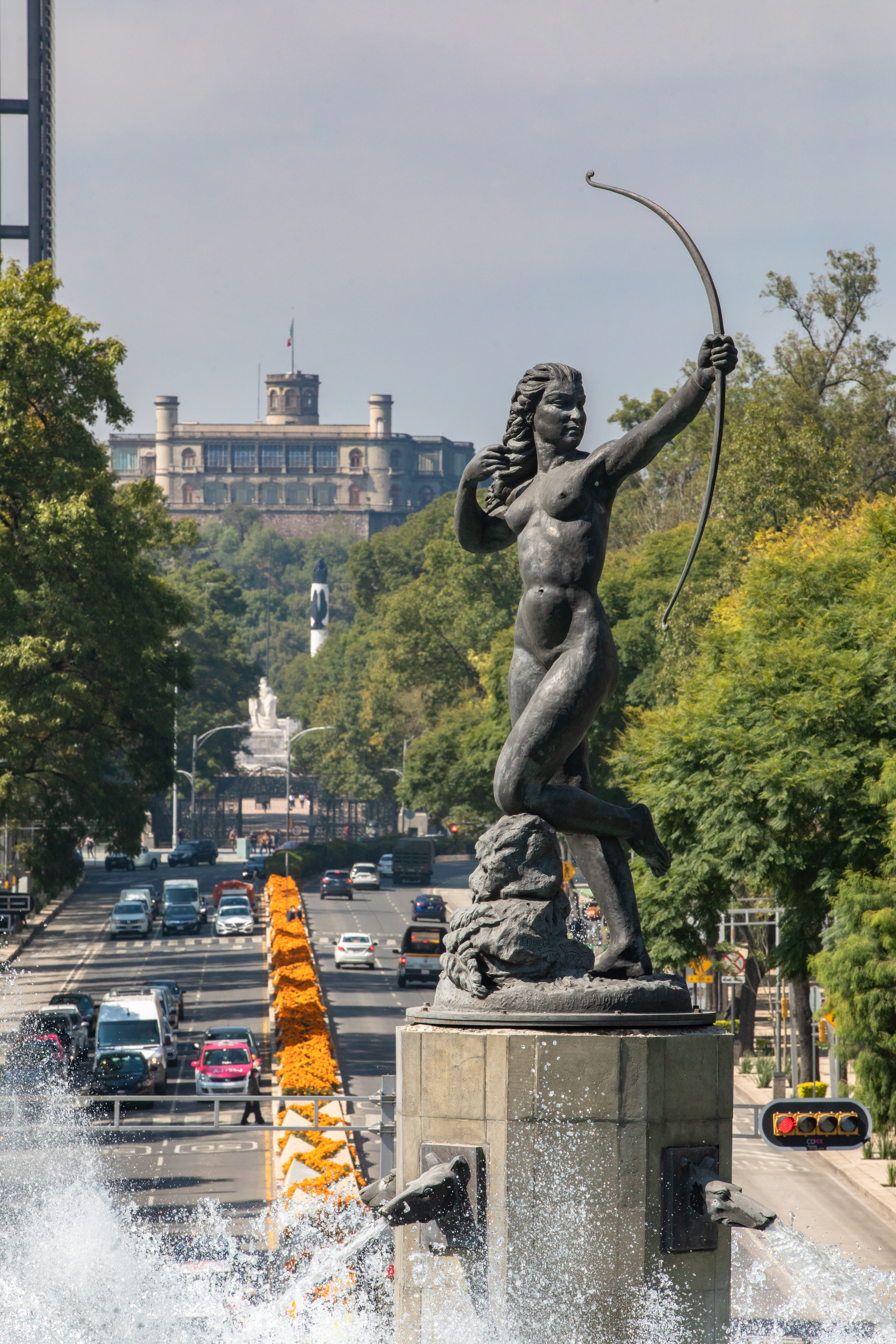
Fuente de la Diana Cazadora (1938–1942) in bronze at Paseo de la Reforma, Mexico City

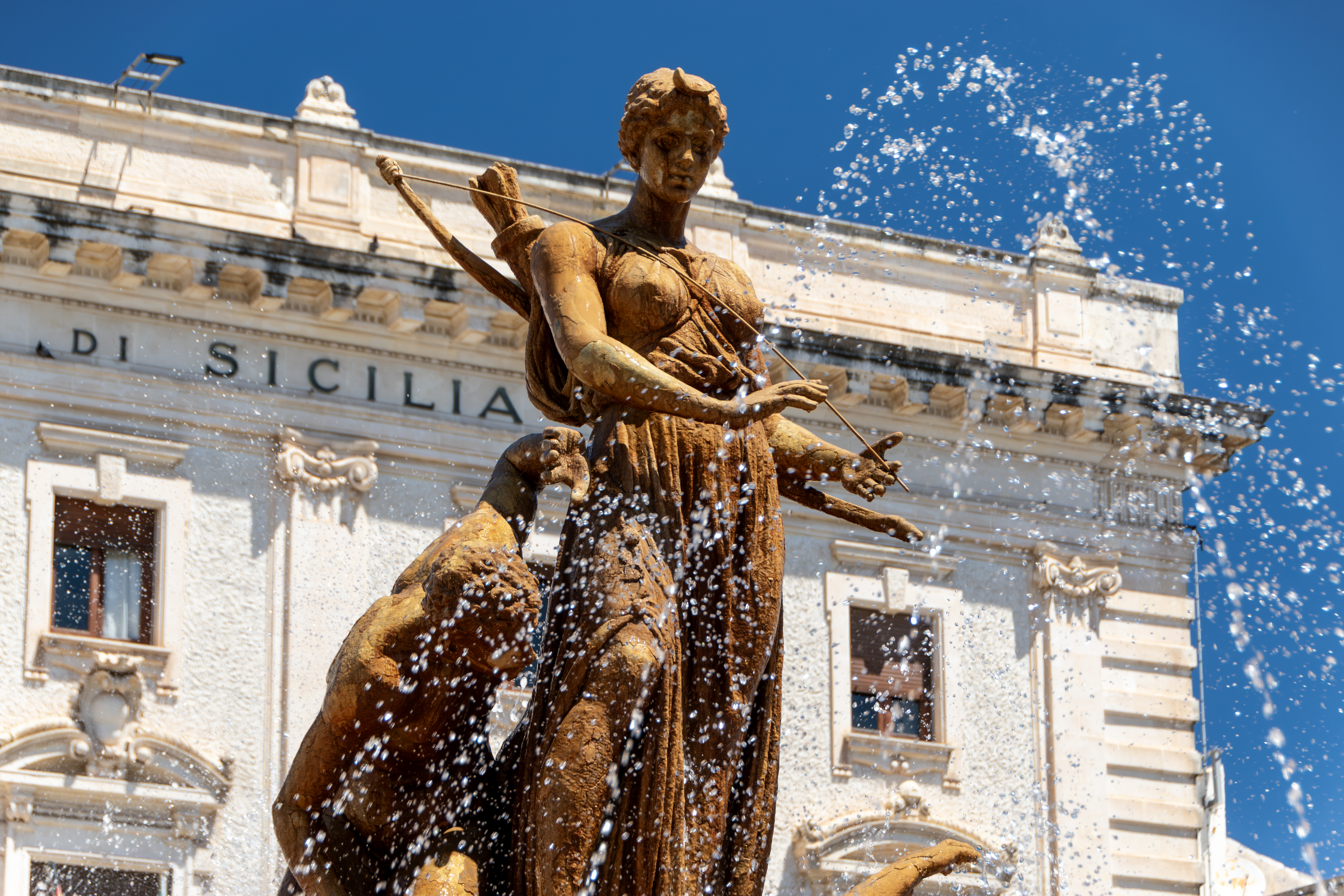
Fontana di Diana (1907), by Giulio and Mario Moschetti In reinforced concrete at Piazza Archimede in Syracuse, Sicily

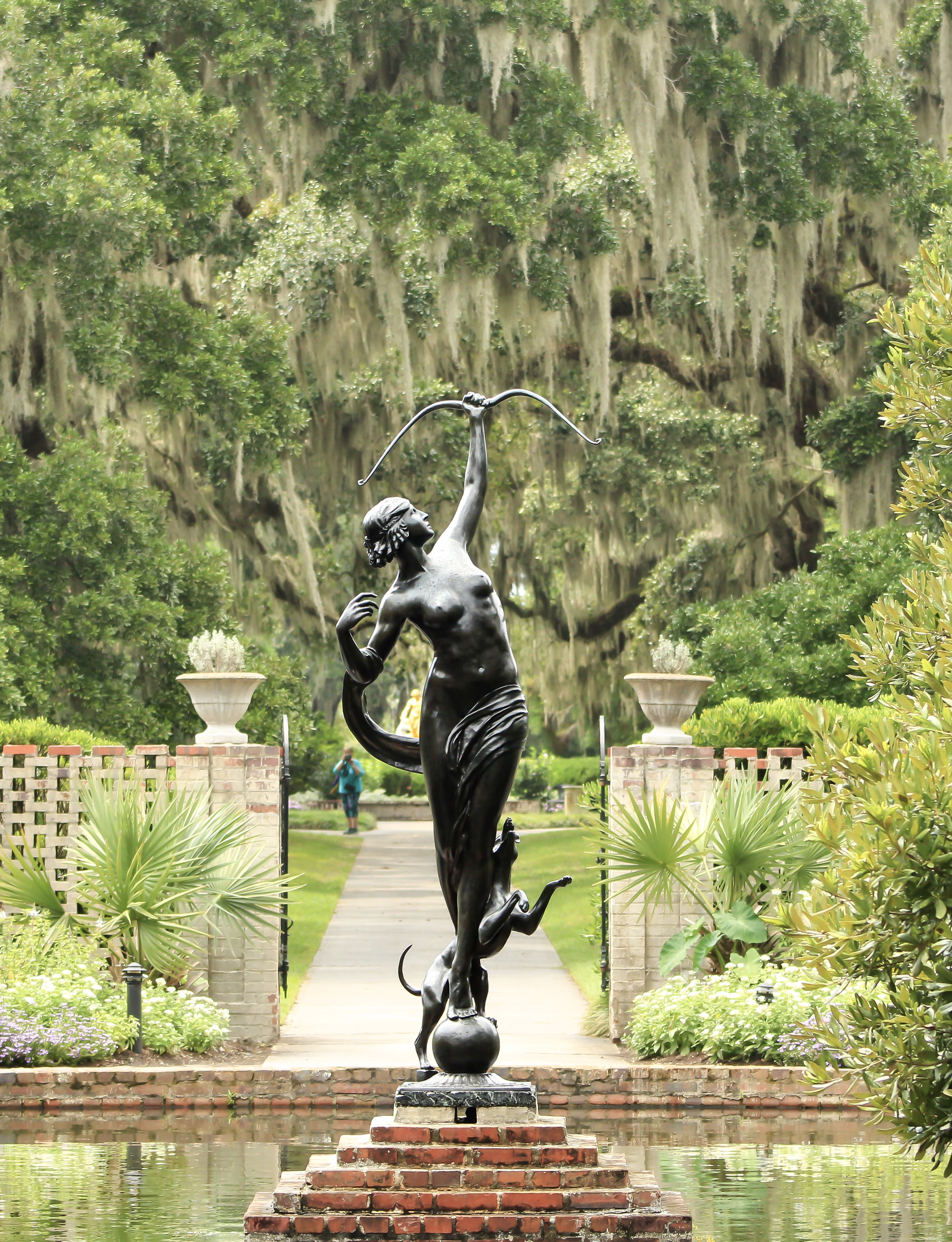
Diana of the Chase (1922), Anna Hyatt Huntington in bronze at Brookgreen Gardens in Murrells Inlet, South Carolina.

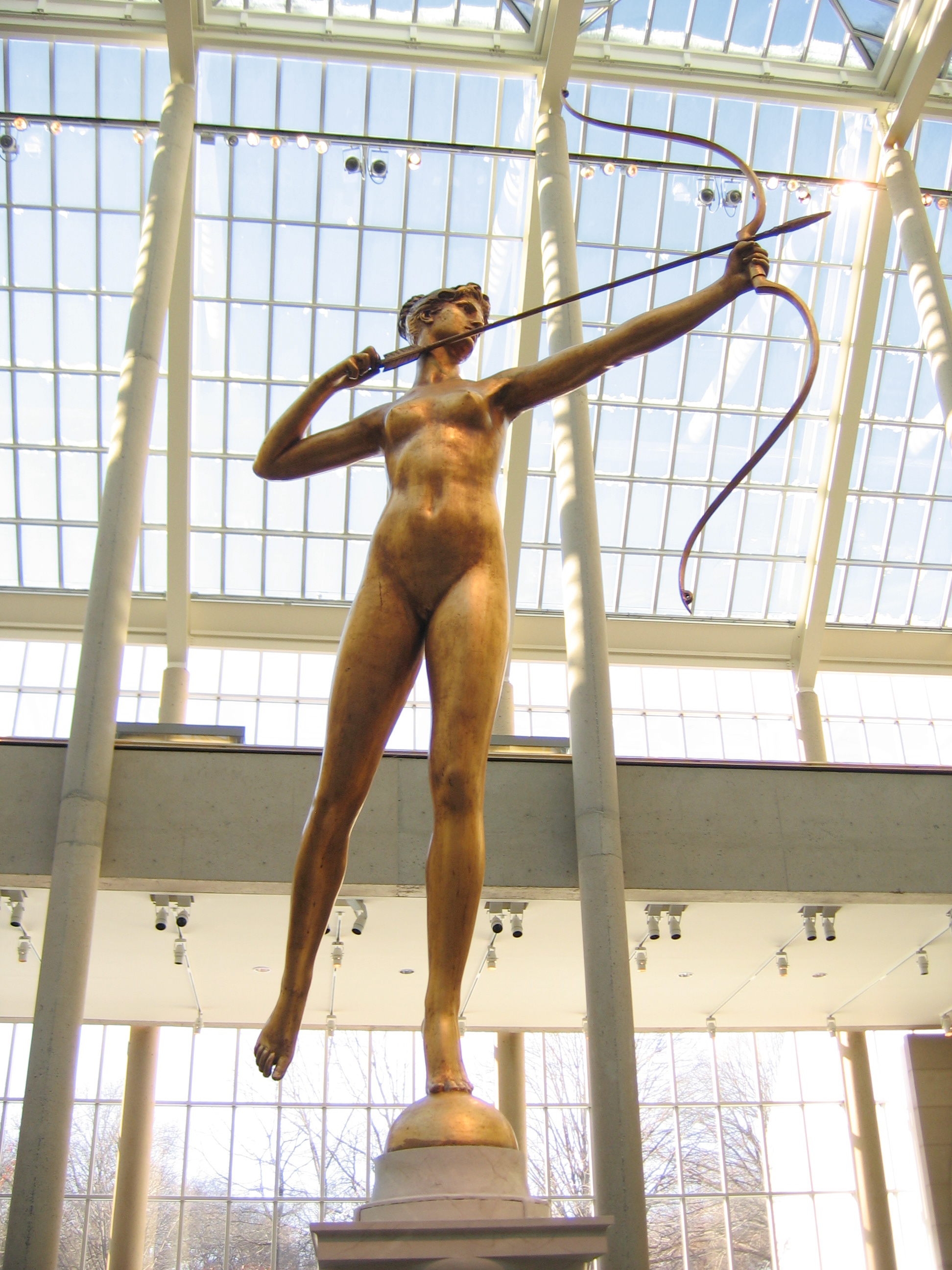
Diana (1892–93), Augustus Saint-Gaudens. Bronze, Metropolitan Museum of Art, New York City.

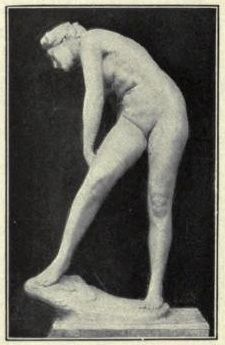
Diana Wounded, bronze statue by Sir Edgar Bertram Mackennal, housed in Tate Gallery of London

Diana has been one of the most popular themes in art. Painters like Titian, Peter Paul Rubens, François Boucher, Nicolas Poussin and made use of her myth as a major theme. Most depictions of Diana in art featured the stories of Diana and Actaeon, or Callisto, or depicted her resting after hunting. Some famous work of arts with a Diana theme are:

- Diana and Actaeon, Diana and Callisto, and Death of Actaeon by Titian.
- Diana and Callisto, Diana Returning from the Hunt, Diana Resting After a Bath, and Diana Getting Out of Bath by François Boucher.
- Diana Bathing With Her Nymphs by Rembrandt.
- Diana and Endymion by Poussin.
- Diana and Callisto, Diana and Her Nymph Departing From Hunt, Diana and Her Nymphs Surprised By A Faun by Rubens.
- Diana and Endymion by Johann Michael Rottmayr.
- Diana Wounded, bronze statue by Sir Edgar Bertram Mackennal, housed in Tate Gallery of London (purchased 1908).
- The famous fountain at Palace of Caserta, Italy, created by Paolo Persico, Brunelli, Pietro Solari, depicting Diana being surprised by Acteon.
- A sculpture by Christophe-Gabriel Allegrain can be seen at the Musée du Louvre.
- Diana of the Tower a copper statue by Augustus Saint-Gaudens was created as the weather vane for the second Madison Square Garden in 1893. It now is on display at the Philadelphia Museum of Art
- A sculpture by French sculptor François-Léon Sicard in the Archibald Fountain, Sydney, NSW, Australia
- In Parma at the convent of San Paolo, Antonio Allegri da Correggio painted the chamber of the Abbess Giovanna Piacenza's apartment. He was commissioned in 1519 to paint the ceiling and mantel of the fireplace. On the mantel he painted an image of Diana riding in a chariot possibly pulled by a stag.
- Fuente de la Diana Cazadora [Fountain of the Huntress Diana], a fountain sculpture of huntress Diana with arrow pointing skyward, stands in the roundabout at Paseo de la Reforma, Zona Rosa, Mexico City's Mexican Federal District.
- Diana of the Chase, a bronze statue by Anna Hyatt Huntington in 1922. Diana was a defining symbol at the time, placed at institutions, such as the Fogg Art Museum at Harvard University, the New York Historical Society in New York City, and the Huntington Art Gallery in San Marino, California. One of the most notable of replicas can be found at Brookgreen Gardens in South Carolina, which was founded by Anna Hyatt Huntington and her husband Archer Milton Huntington in 1932.
- Beaux Arts architecture and garden design (late 19th and early 20th centuries) used classic references in a modernized form. Two of the most popular of the period were of Pomona (goddess of orchards) as a metaphor for Agriculture, and Diana, representing Commerce, which is a perpetual hunt for advantage and profits.

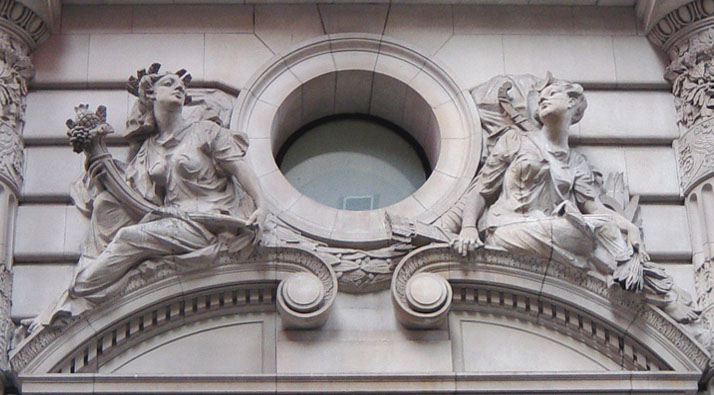
Pomona (left, symbolizing agriculture), and Diana (symbolizing commerce) as building decoration

There are many statues of Diana the Huntress in Yambol, Bulgaria.

==== In film ====
- In Jean Cocteau's 1946 film Beauty and the Beast, it is Diana's power which has transformed and imprisoned the beast.
- Diana/Artemis appears at the end of the 'Pastoral Symphony' segment of Fantasia.
- In his 1968 film La Mariée était en noir François Truffaut plays on this mythological symbol. Julie Kohler, played by Jeanne Moreau, poses as Diana/Artemis for the artist Fergus. This choice seems fitting for Julie, a character beset by revenge, of which Fergus becomes the fourth victim. She poses with a bow and arrow, while wearing white.
- In the 1995 comedy Four Rooms, a coven of witches resurrects a petrified Diana on New Year's Eve.
- French based collective LFKs and his film/theatre director, writer and visual artist Jean Michel Bruyere produced a series of 600 shorts and "medium" film, an interactive audiovisual 360° installation (Si poteris narrare licet ("if you are able to speak of it, then you may do so" ...... ) in 2002, and a 3D 360° audiovisual installation La Dispersion du Fils from 2008 to 2016 as well as an outdoor performance, "Une Brutalité pastorale" (2000), all about the myth of Diana and Actaeon.

==== In music ====
- Diana is a character in Hippolytus and Aricia, an opera by Jean-Philippe Rameau.
- For the album art of progressive metal band Protest the Hero's second studio album Fortress, Diana is depicted protected by rams and other animals. The theme of Diana is carried throughout the album.
- The Norwegian classical composer Martin Romberg wrote a mass for mixed choir in seven parts after a selection of poems from Leland's text Aradia, in which Diana features heavily. The Witch Mass was premiered at the Vestfold International Festival in 2012 with Grex Vocalis. In order to create the right atmosphere for the music, the festival blocked of an entire road tunnel in Tønsberg to use it as a venue. The work was released on CD through Lawo Classics in 2014.
- Artemis, and subsequently Diana, is used as focal point in "Artemis", track twelve of AURORA's 2022 album The Gods We Can Touch

=== Other ===
- In the funeral oration of Diana, Princess of Wales in 1997, her brother drew an analogy between the ancient goddess of hunting and his sister – "the most hunted person of the modern age".
- DIANA Mayer & Grammelspacher GmbH & Co.KG, an airgun company, is named after Diana, the goddess of hunting.
- The Royal Netherlands Air Force 323rd Squadron is named Diana and uses a depiction of Diana with her bow in its badge.
- In Ciudad Juárez in Mexico a woman calling herself "Diana Huntress of Bus Drivers" was responsible for the shooting of two bus drivers in 2013 in what may have been vigilante attacks.
- Diana is commemorated in the scientific name of a species of coral snake, Micrurus diana.

== See also ==
- Dianic Wicca
- Janus
- Domus de Janas
- Pachamama
- List of lunar deities
