= Diana Returning from the Hunt =

Painting by François Boucher

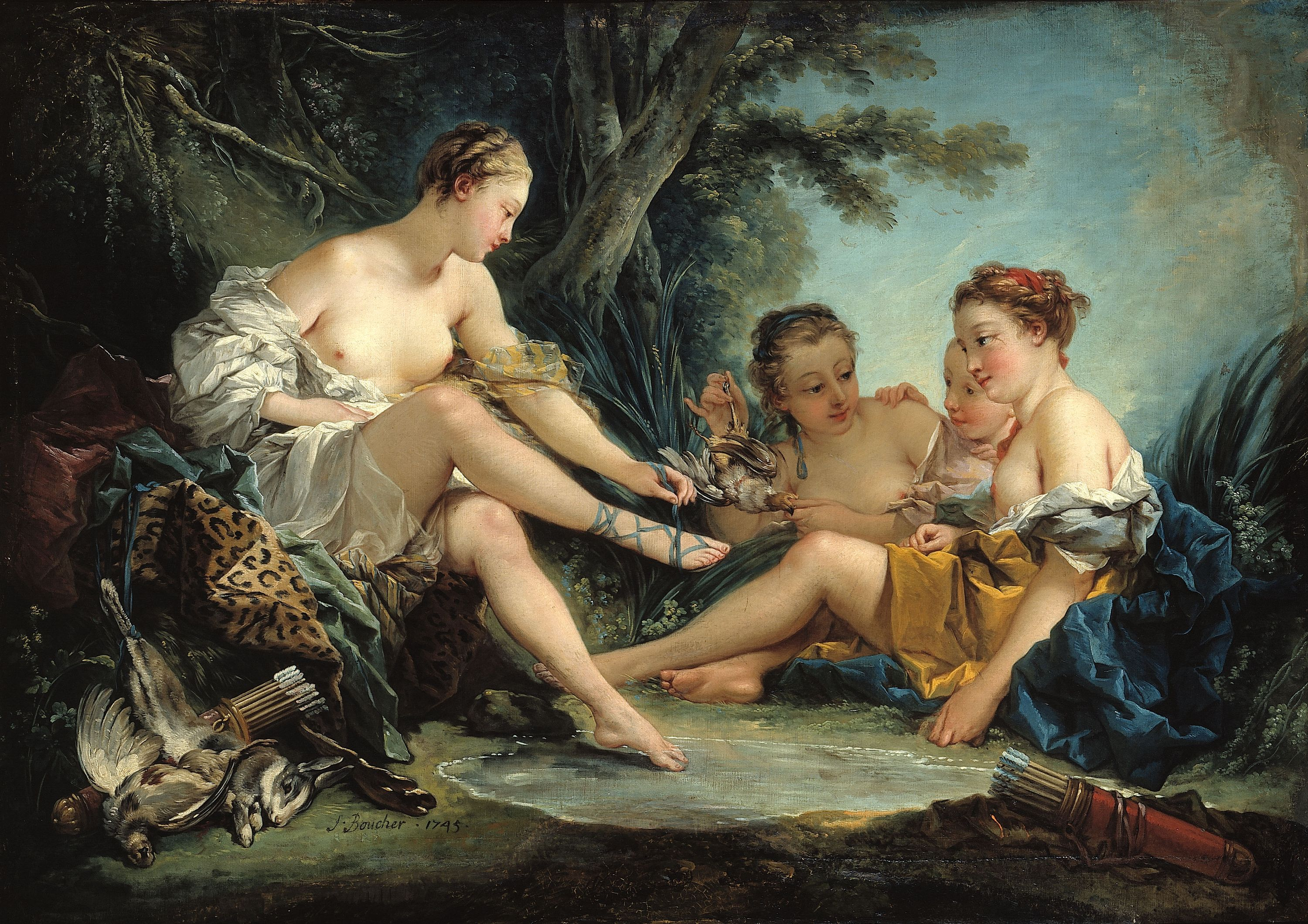
- Artist: François Boucher
- Medium: oil on canvas
- Dimensions: 37 cm × 52 cm (15 in × 20 in)
- Location: Musée Cognacq-Jay, Paris

Diana Returning from the Hunt, also referred to as Nymphs Reposing from the Chase, is an 18th-century oil painting by the French Rococo artist François Boucher. Painted in 1745, the work depicts Diana, the Roman goddess of the hunt, as she returns from a hunting expedition, accompanied by three nymphs. The painting is a part of a series of overdoors created by Boucher for an unknown setting. This painting highlights the themes of femininity, classical mythology, and nature popular in Rococo art.

== Description ==
Diana Returning from the Hunt captures four women, three on the right-hand side of the piece, with the figure assumed to be Diana on the left. Diana reclines in a cross-legged position, reaching toward her sandal, her other foot bare and resting in a pool of water below. She is loosely wrapped in light-colored fabric, with her chest exposed, and hair pinned back, sitting on an array of fabrics and animal pelts beside a quiver of arrows and a bow beneath a dead rabbit and bird.

The three women on the right are seated on the forest floor, overlapping one another. Each is wearing loose, draping fabrics with their chests exposed and hair tied back with ribbons. The furthest woman holds a bird by the leg, with the central woman embracing her, and the woman closest in the foreground gazing toward Diana, a second quiver of arrows resting in the right-hand corner.

The background on the left-hand side of the piece depicts a forest with deep greens and browns, with a pale blue sky littered with wispy clouds to the right, and a pool of water in the bottom center, framing the four women in the center of a triangle formation. The darkness of the forest beyond and the dark brown in the foreground is juxtaposed with the pale quality of the women's skin.

The textures of the skin and clothing of the women are soft, smooth, and delicately rendered. Boucher shows attention to the surface qualities of the skin, hair, clothing, and surrounding nature.

== Related works and provenance ==
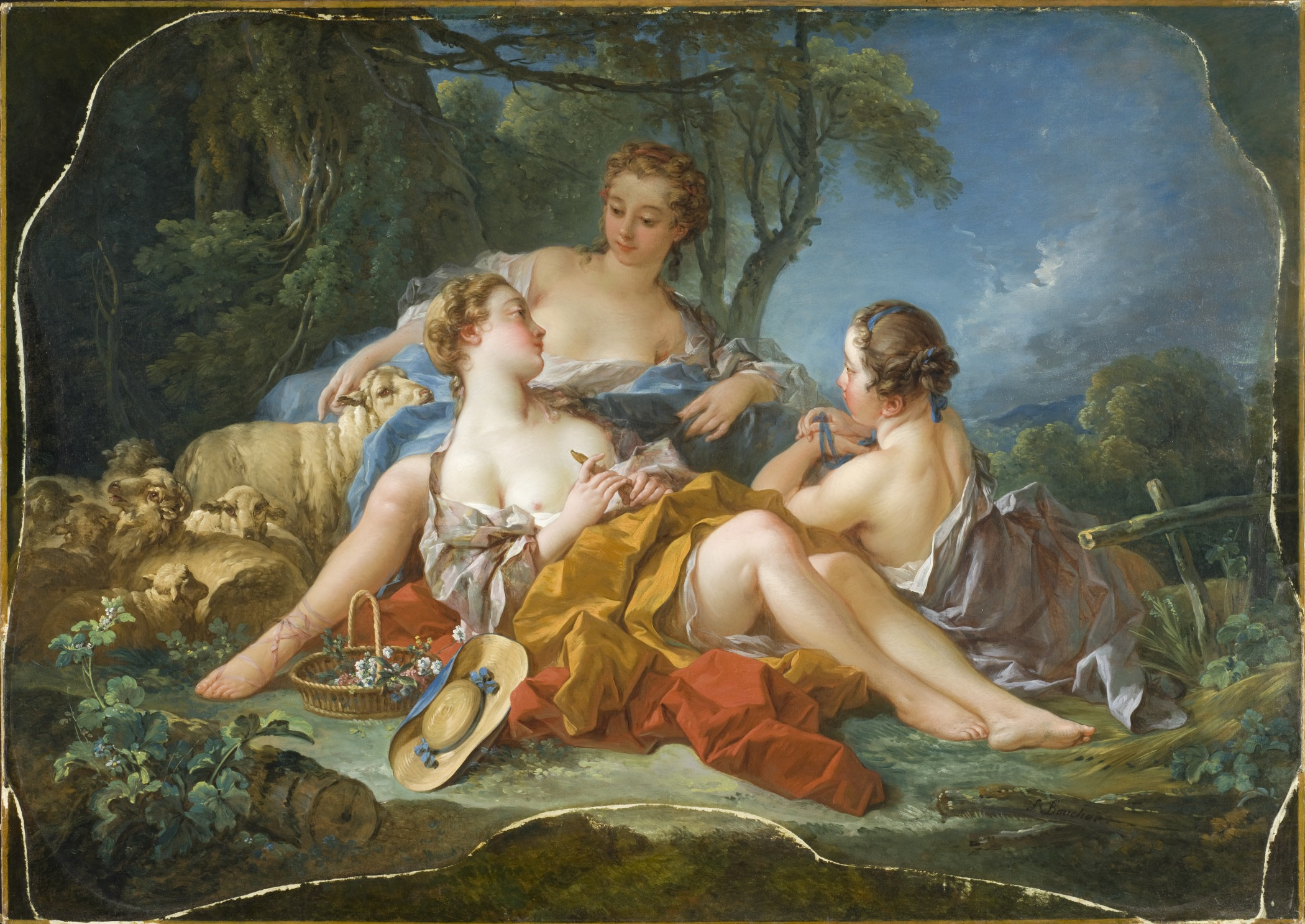
François Boucher, The Exchange of Confidences, 1745. LACMA.

The painting is one of four related overdoors by Boucher that were all engraved by Claude Augustin Duflos, suggesting that they may belong to a series. Of the other three works, one is currently in Los Angeles County Museum of Art (LACMA) and the other two are in the Wallace Collection. The inscriptions on the Duflos prints indicate that they were mythological scenes. In the scene thought to represent Diana, the print shows a crescent moon in her hair, further identifying her as the goddess.

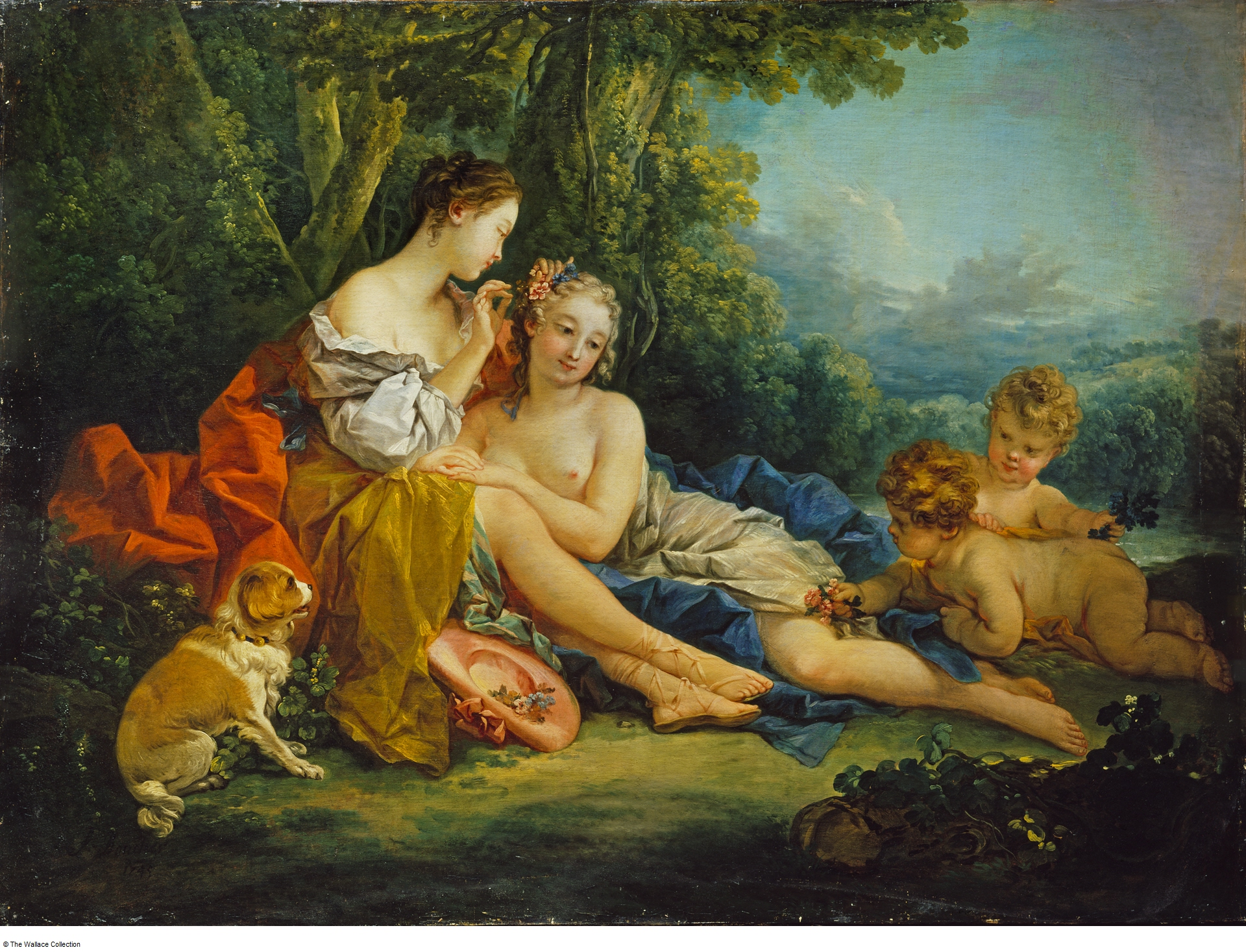
François Boucher, Pastoral Make-Up, 1745. Wallace Collection.

The provenance of the four paintings has been linked to the Folie de Chartres, though this connection remains uncertain. While the works bear no inscriptions indicating ownership, they were listed with this provenance in a Paris sale held from November 18–29, 1834. However, this identification has been contested. Thérèse Burollet has argued that the descriptions in the 1834 sale catalogue are too vague to confirm the paintings' identity, suggesting they could instead be the overdoors from Harlaxton Manor. Additionally, the Folie de Chartres pavilion was not constructed until 1769-73 which was too late for the Rococo style of these paintings. It is unlikely that their provenance would have been remembered or recorded a generation later, especially if they were confiscated or lost during the Revolution. If they were genuinely from the Folie, Louis-Philippe would likely have reclaimed them as his father's property.

== Subject and themes ==
=== Idealized beauty and femininity ===
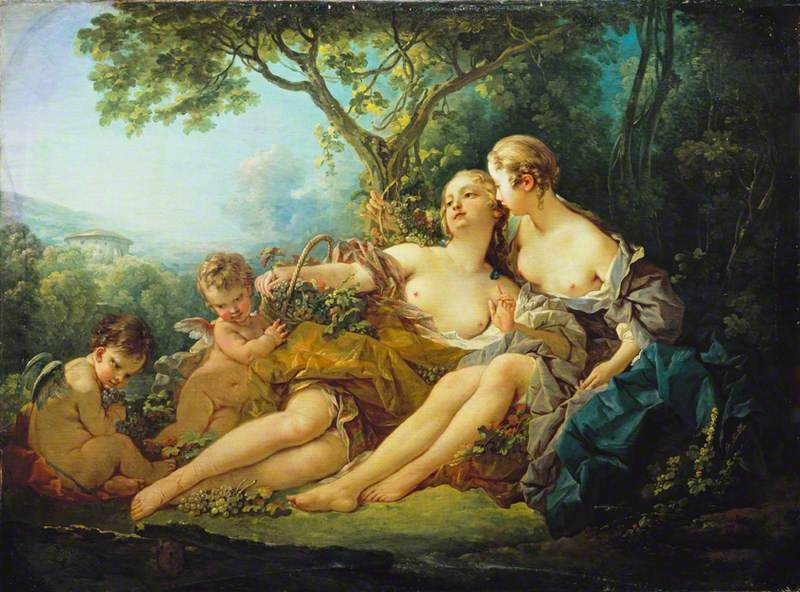
François Boucher, Erigone Conquered, 1745. Wallace Collection.

One theme from Diana Returning from the Hunt is the commitment to idyllic beauty and femininity, a common theme from the Rococo period. The figures's partial nudity, bare skin, graceful poses, and loose drapery highlight their etherial and feminine nature. The elegant posing of the nymphs was used by Boucher in previous works, particularly of the goddess Diana, such as in Diana at the Bath (1742), to emphasize feminine poise.

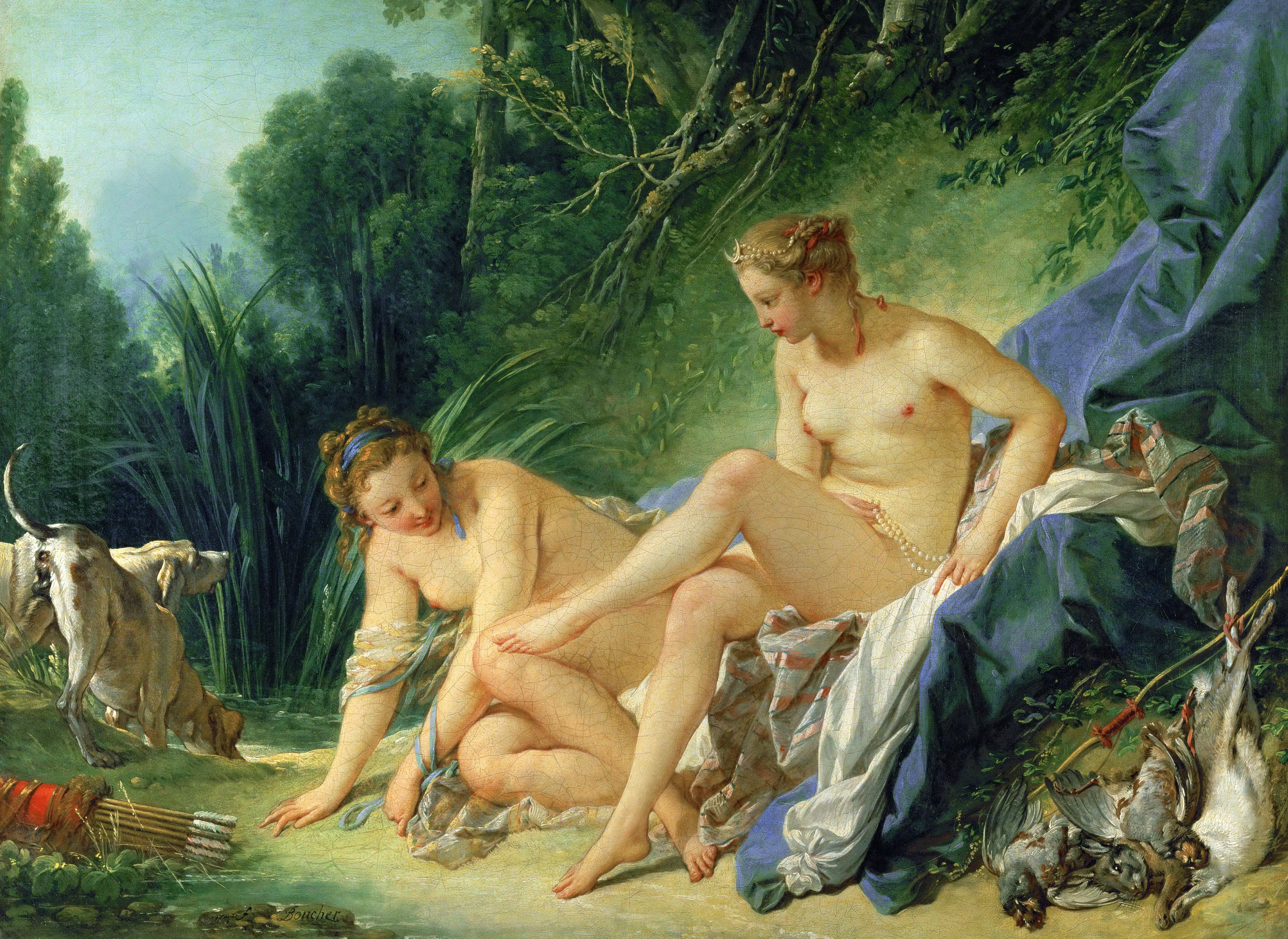
Diana at the Bath by François Boucher (1742)

=== Nature ===
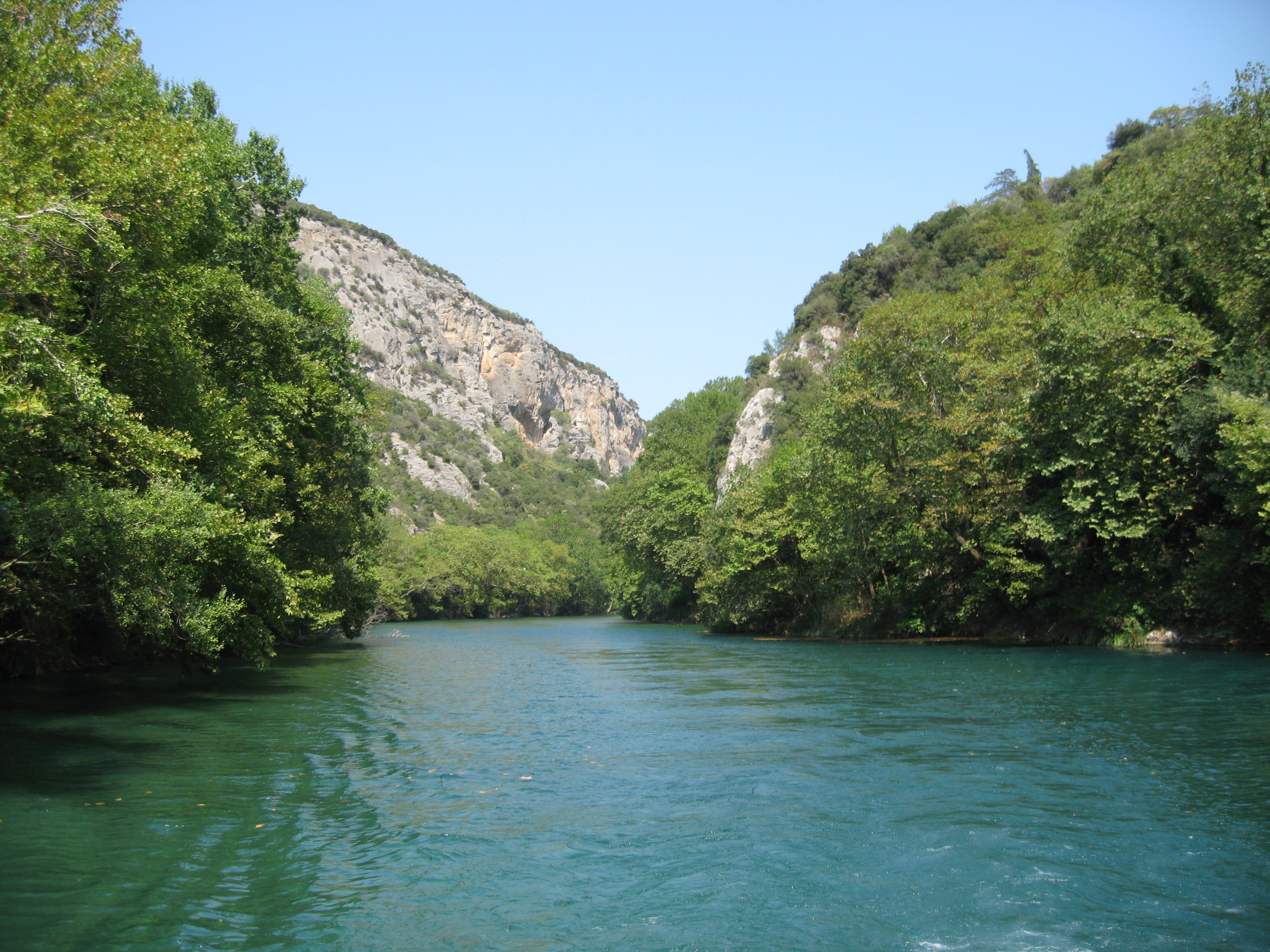
Vale of Tempe

The painting also explores the lushness of idyllic nature. The painting depicts a pool of water, trees behind the figures in the foreground, and hunted birds and rabbits beside the figure of Diana. Other works in the series of four overdoors, including The Exchange of Confidences and Erigone Conquered, are thought to depict nymphs from the Greek Vale of Tempe and Arcadia, placing them in similarly idyllic settings.

=== Classical mythology ===
The central figure of this painting is often thought to be Diana, the Roman goddess of the hunt. The leopard skin to her left, her quiver of arrows, and the secondary position of the nymphs to her right all support the identification, as does the presence of the crescent moon in her hair in the print of this work by Duflos. In the painting, the absence of the crescent moon makes her identity more ambiguous.
