= Tifata =

Mountain in Italy

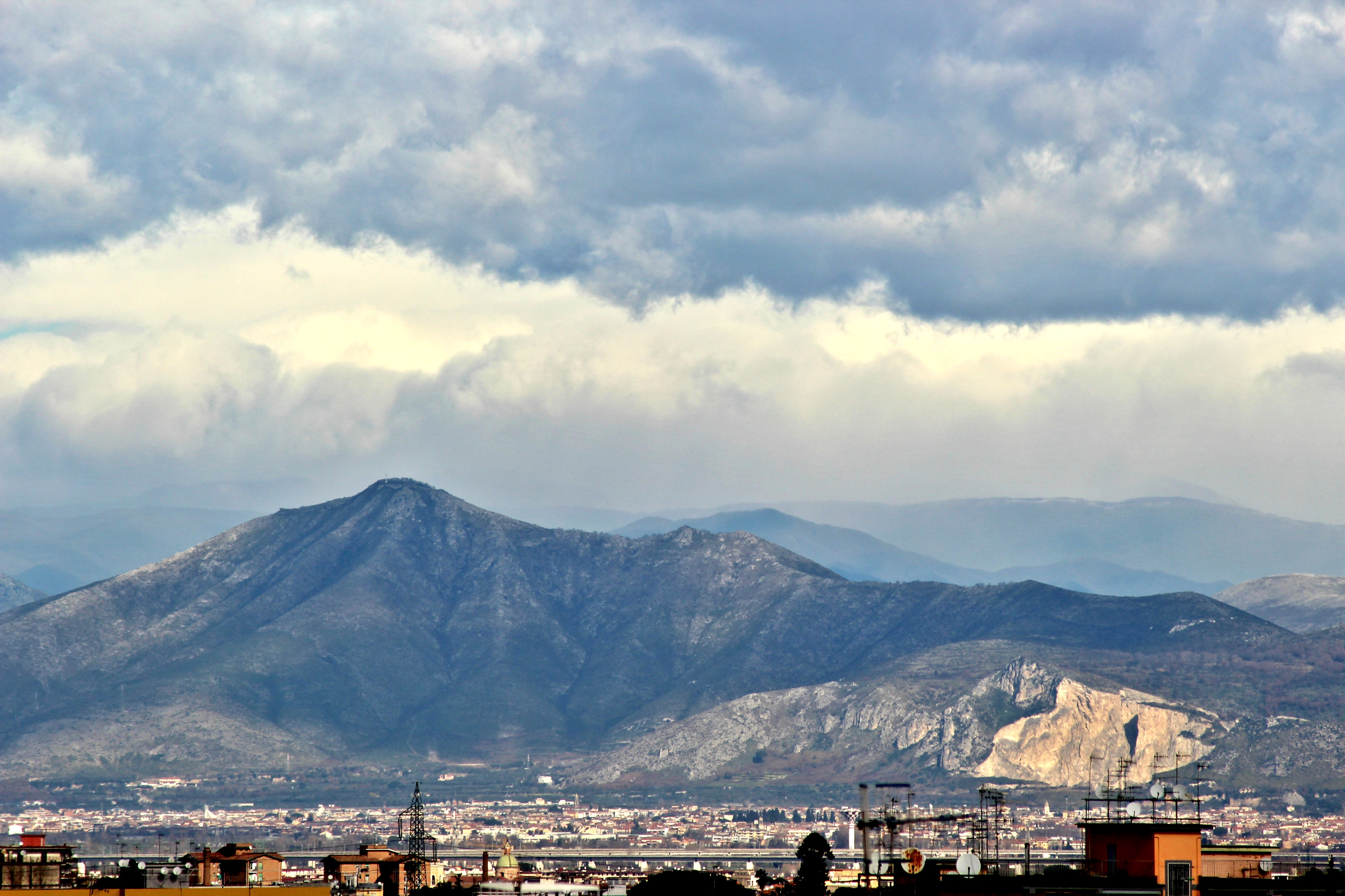
- Overview of Mount Tifata.

Highest point
- Elevation: 602 m (1,975 ft)
- Coordinates: 41°03′57″N 14°10′12″E

Geography
- Location within Italy
- Location: Campania, Italy

Tifata is a mountain of Campania, Italy. The Abbey of Sant'Angelo in Formis is located on its western slopes.

In 83 BC as part of Sulla's civil war a battle was fought in the foothills of Mount Tifata.
