= Guillaume du Tillot =

French politician (1711–1774)

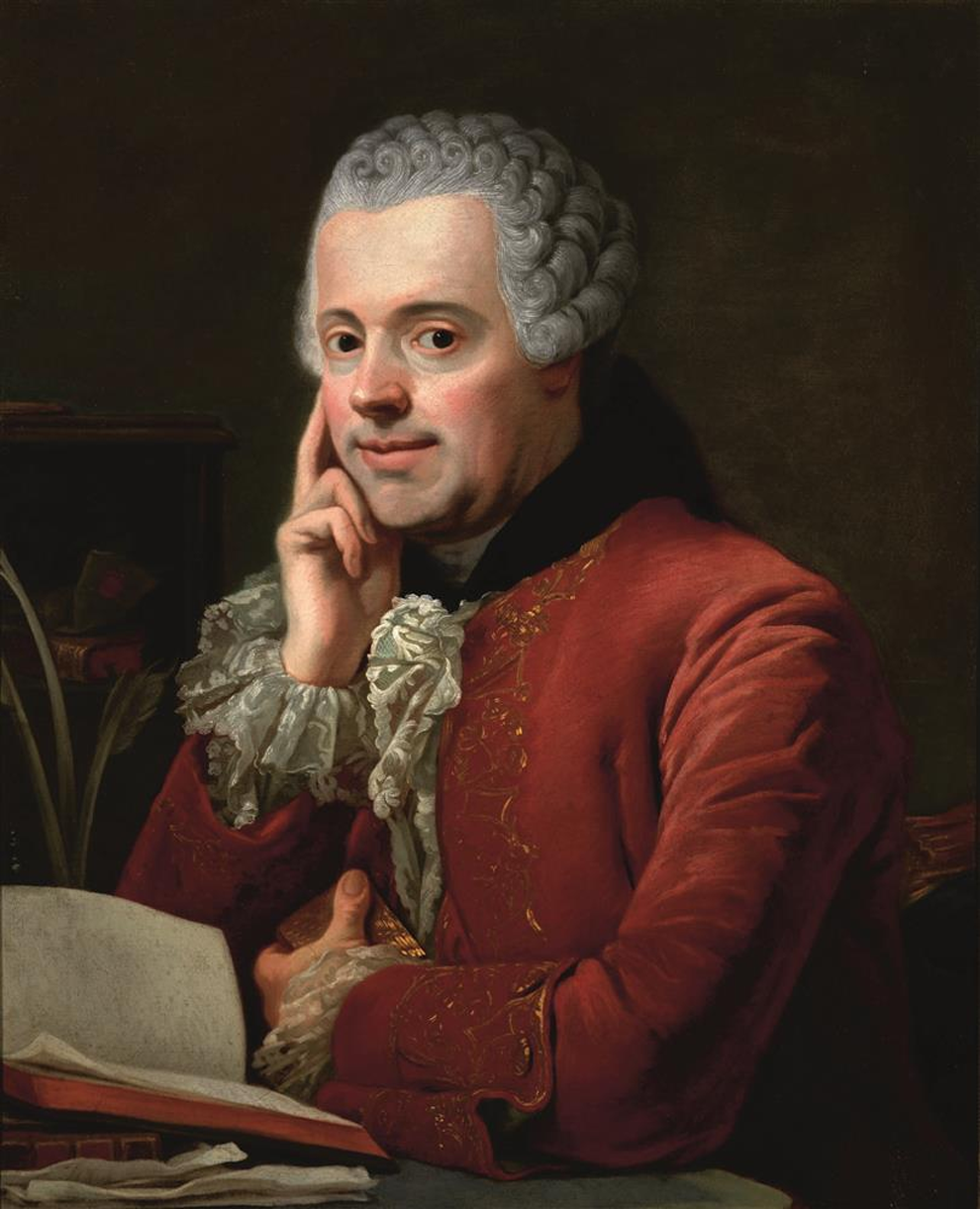
- Portrait of Guillaume du Tillot by Pietro Melchiorre Ferrari (Biblioteca Palatina, Parma)

Prime Minister
- In office 29 June 1749 – 19 November 1771
- Monarch: Philip, Duke of Parma

Personal details
- Born: 22 May 1711 Bayonne Kingdom of France
- Died: 13 December 1774 (aged 63) Paris, Kingdom of France

Léon Guillaume (du) Tillot (22 May 1711 – 13 December 1774) was a French politician infused with liberal ideals of the Enlightenment, who from 1759 was the minister of the Duchy of Parma under Philip, Duke of Parma and his wife Princess Louise-Élisabeth of France. At a time when both Bourbon France and Bourbon Spain thought of Parma as a strategic point of interest, Tillot favoured French policies abroad and wide-ranging reforms within the Duchy of Parma. He was made marchese di Felino.

Tillot's career was of his own making. The son of a valet de chambre, he was born in Bayonne. He studied at the Collège des Quatre-Nations in Paris, then went to the court of Charles III of Spain; after Charles' departure to be King of Sicily, Tillot was attached to the household of Philippe de Bourbon, whose private secretary and treasurer he became. He organised fêtes for Philippe at Chambéry and elsewhere.

== Career at Parma ==
In June 1749, at Louis XV's request he left Paris for Parma, to serve as observer and councillor to Philippe, Louis's son-in-law, who was made Duke of Parma under terms of the Treaty of Aix-la-Chapelle (1748). The Duke immediately named him (29 June 1749), minister of finance (intendant général du coffre) conferring upon Tillot responsibilities for court spending, paymaster of salaries, overseer of the palaces, gardens, court theatre, spectacles and festivities.

In this role, Tillot promoted all forms of French musical theater at the court. He commissioned the "reform opera" Ippolito ed Aricia from Tommaso Traetta with a libretto based upon Abbé Simon-Joseph Pellegrin's libretto for Rameau's earlier opera Hippolyte et Aricie, which was in turn based on Racine's tragedy Phèdre. The opera premiered at the Teatro Ducale in Parma on 9 May 1759, and is still sometimes mounted.

Tillot's capabilities were soon rewarded with the position of minister of public finance, and then of first minister. His ministry, modernizing and liberalizing the Duchy's official functions, helped boost its economy. On 20 June 1764, Tillot was made marchese di Felino, receiving its lands as well as those of San Michele Tiorre.

Tillot, like a latter-day Colbert, reorganized Parmesan luxury productions: gloves, velvet and other fine textiles, and featherdressing. He enticed from France and Switzerland masterworkers in these crafts, to teach their arts locally. Out of the Ducal purse, he conceded tax relief, patronage and financial support for the new industries, and offered state pensions for craftsmen who had taken on apprentices in Parma. In agriculture, partly in response to the famine years of 1763-67, which devastated the Mezzogiorno and were felt in the North, he encouraged cultivation of the potato, still a novelty in Europe. For the better flow of people and goods, he improved roads and bridges, canalised waterways and liberalised importation and exportation. In these undertakings he was aided by the longest period of peace Italy had known.

Tillot placed his influence with the Bourbon courts of France, Spain and Naples, in reducing antiquated ecclesiastical privileges, even the freedom from taxation of properties of the Church. The Roman Inquisition was abolished in the territories of Parma, and some decayed monasteries were secularised. Pope Clement XIII condemned the expulsion of the Jesuits from Parma (8 February 1768).

Along with the reorganisation of the ducal library, Tillot assembled his private one, in which the works of the Encyclopédistes and the Encyclopédie were to be found. Tillot instituted an Académie des Beaux Arts, a museum of Antiquities, a ducal printing-press, which produced the Gazzetta di Parma. He reorganised the University of Parma, one of Europe's oldest, from its somnolence; for a brief spell it ranked among the progressive universities of Italy, with Milan, Pavia and Modena.

Around Tillot an Enlightened circle gathered: Condillac, Paolo Maria Paciaudi, the typographer and publisher Giambattista Bodoni, the sculptor Jean Baptiste Boudard, and Tillot's guest at the court of Parma, the architect Ennemond Alexandre Petitot, who arrived in 1753 and provided designs for the renovated face of Parma. Petitot modified the facade of the church of San Pietro, rebuilt the governor's palace, and carried out interior remodelling in the Palazzo della Riserva, the Stradone Martiri della Libertà boulevard, and the ducal Palazzo del Giardino, laid out in the French manner with sculptures by Boudard. Petitot survived Tillot's disgrace, took over Tillot's early employment as master of ceremonies and remained court architect at Parma until his death in 1801.

In 1756, Tillot invited to court Guillaume Rouby de Cals, whom he employed first in the financial administration, then as his personal secretary and aide. Rouby de Cals directed the first manufactory of military cloth in Parma, in Borgo San Donnino, now Fidenza.

== The fall of Tillot ==
With the accession to the Duchy of the somewhat simple Ferdinand, Duke of Parma (1751–1802) and his Habsburg Duchess, Archduchess Maria Amalia of Austria, an alliance that had been organised by her mother, Maria Theresa, Tillot was soon cashiered, in spite of protests from France and Spain. He had made deep political enemies in the Church, and the new Duchess effected a shift away from Bourbon influences towards conservative Austria, though his replacement, Jose de Llano, was Spanish. Tillot was confined under house arrest to his properties at Colorno. He fled on 19 November 1771, intending to reach Spain, but ended his days in retirement in France. He died in Paris in 1774.

The classic biography is U. Benassi, Guglielmo du Tillot: Un ministro riformatore del secolo XVIII (Parma, 1915).

== Bibliography ==
- Venturi, Franco (1976). "Church and Reform in Enlightenment Italy: The Sixties of the Eighteenth Century". The Journal of Modern History. 48 (2): 215–232. JSTOR 1879827.
