= Aricia =

Aricia can refer to:

- Aricia (butterfly), a genus of butterflies
- Aricia (mythology), a minor figure in Greek mythology
- Aricia, Italy
- Hippolytus and Aricia, an opera by Jean-Philippe Rameau
- MV Aricia, an Okanagan Lake ferry
