= Ippolito ed Aricia =

Opera by Tommaso Traetta

Ippolito ed Aricia is a "reform opera" in five acts by Tommaso Traetta with an Italian libretto by Carlo Innocenzo Frugoni. The opera is based upon abbé Simon-Joseph Pellegrin's libretto for Rameau's earlier opera Hippolyte et Aricie, which was in turn based on Racine's tragedy Phèdre. The work premiered at the Teatro Ducale in Parma on 9 May 1759 and is still occasionally performed today.

== Background and musical analysis ==
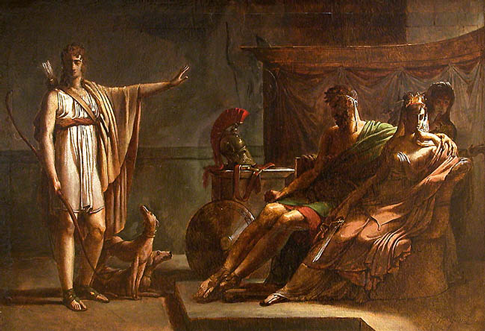
Phèdre et Hippolyte by Baron Pierre-Narcisse Guérin (1802)

Ippolito ed Aricia was commissioned in 1759 by Guillaume du Tillot, a minister for Philip, Duke of Parma, on behalf of the duke and his wife, Princess Louise Élisabeth of France. At that time, both France and Spain thought of Parma as a strategic point of interest and subsidized the court heavily. The duke and his wife were particularly fond of French opera and Tillot promoted all forms of French musical theater at the court. However, Tillot decided that he wanted to commission an opera for the court that would merge Italian musical idioms, such as beautiful melodies and virtuosic coloratura display, with French dramatic forms like choruses, ballet, and supernatural elements. He approached Carlo Innocenzo Frugoni, court poet of Parma, with the idea of creating such an opera using the Italian text of Rameau's Hippolyte et Aricie. He agreed, and Tillot proceeded to recruit Tommaso Traetta to compose the music and Count Francesco Algarotti to assist Frugoni with the libretto.

The resulting work is a rare successful blend of Italian opera seria elements and the French tragédie lyrique. The opera has virtuosic exit arias in the opera seria tradition of Metastasio but is organized into five acts, as in French opera. There are 12 characters in the drama, four prominent instrumental sinfonias, elaborate choruses, and 26 dances, most of which are organized into suites. The instrumentation is highly creative and often employs solo or independent viola writing. Obbligato recitative is used for moments of extreme drama, and here the orchestral accompaniment is elaborate and complex. Choral movements are large and often involve solo passages for various members of the cast. Du Tillot advertised the performance extensively. The production was lavish and brilliant and the opera a huge success, for nothing like it had ever been tried before.

== Major roles ==
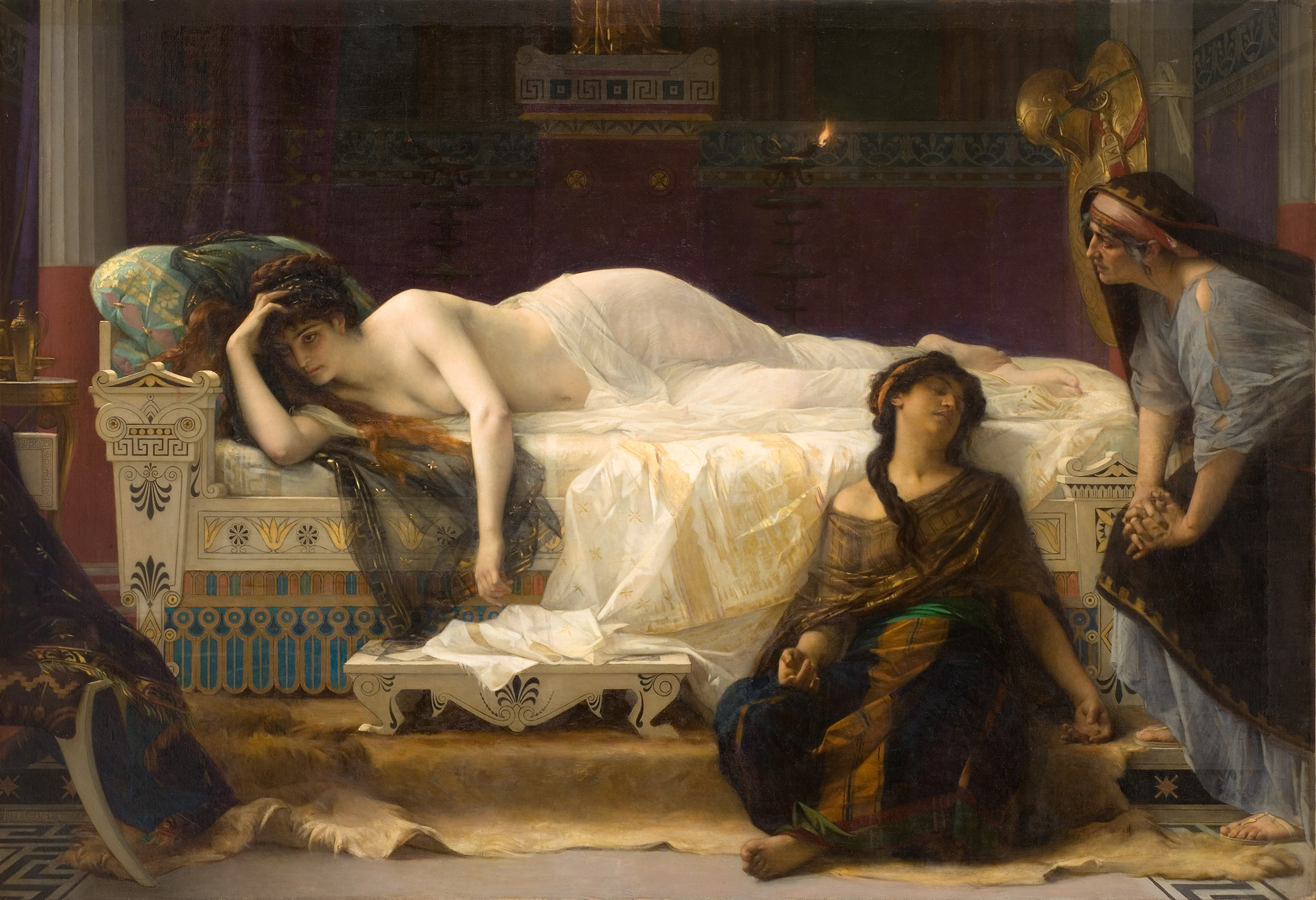
Alexandre Cabanel's painting Phaedra (1880)

Roles, voice types, premiere cast
Role	Voice type	Premiere cast, 9 May 1759
Teseo (Theseus), king of Athens	tenor	Angelo Amorevoli
Ippolito (Hippolytus), son of Teseo	soprano castrato	Filippo Elisi
Fedra (Phaedra), Teseo's wife and stepmother to Ippolito	soprano	Maria Piccinelli Verziari
Enone (Oenone), nurse and confidante of Fedra	soprano	Domenica Lambertini
Aricia, princess of the blood royal of Athens	soprano	Caterina Gabrielli
Diana, a goddess	soprano	Maria Monari
Plutone (Pluto)	bass	Francesco Cavalli
Tisifone	soprano	Antonia Fascitelli
Mercurio (Mercury)	bass	Ludovico Felloni
Gran sacerdotessa di Diana, High Priestess of Diana	soprano	
Una marinaia, a female sailor	soprano	
Una cacciatrice, a huntress	soprano	

== Recordings ==
- Ippolito ed Aricia with conductor David Golub, the Orchestra Internazionale d'Italia, and the Bratislava Chamber Choir. The cast includes Angelo Manzotti (Hippolytus), Patrizia Ciofi (Aricia), Elena Lopéz (Phaedra), Simon Edwards (Theseus), Maria Miccoli (Oenone), Stefania Donzelli (Diana), Luca Grassi (Plutone), Monica Sesto (Tisifone), Saverio Fiore (Mercurio), Sara Allegretta (High priestess), Angela Masi (Una Marinaia), Rossana Potenza (Una Cacciatrice), Loredana Cinieri and Madia Todisco (Le Parche). Recorded live in 1999 and released in 2000.
