= Tommaso Traetta =

Italian composer

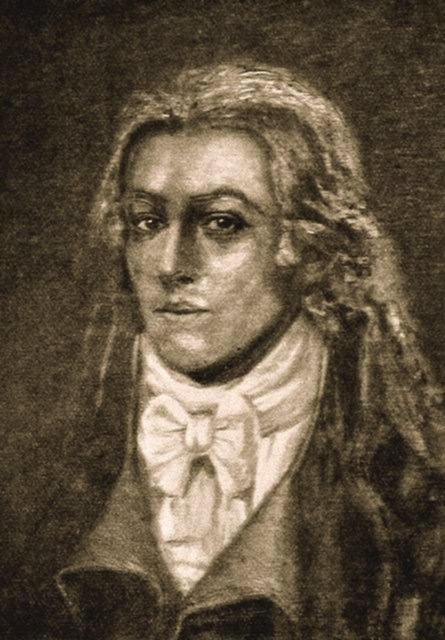
- Born: 30 March 1727; Bitonto, Kingdom of Naples
- Died: 6 April 1779 (aged 52); Venice, Republic of Venice
- Occupation: Composer

Tommaso Michele Francesco Saverio Traetta (30 March 1727 – 6 April 1779), was an Italian composer of the Neapolitan School. Along with other composers mainly in the Holy Roman Empire and France, he was responsible for certain operatic reforms including reducing the ornateness of style and the primacy of star singers.

== Biography ==
Traetta was born in Bitonto, a town near Bari in the Apulia region of Italy. He was a student of a composer, singer, and teacher Nicola Porpora in Naples, and found early success with his opera Il Farnace in 1751. Around this time, he came into contact with Niccolò Jommelli. Traetta found regular commissions throughout Italy, before accepting a post as court composer at Parma in 1759.

The ruler of Parma, Philip, Duke of Parma had married the eldest daughter of Louis XV. In Parma, there was a craving for all things French and the splendor of Versailles.

It was in Parma that Traetta's operas first moved in new directions. As a result, Antigona, his 1772 opera for Saint Petersburg, was amongst his most forward-looking, the closest he approached the famous reform ideals usually associated with Gluck.

It was at the court of the Duke of Bourbon-Parma, that Traetta ran into some fresh air from France. In Parma in 1759, he found several noteworthy collaborators, and he was fortunate in finding that the man in charge of opera there was a highly cultivated Paris-trained Frenchman, Guillaume du Tillot, who had the complete cultural portfolio among all his other responsibilities as Don Felipe's First Minister. To judge from the general stylistic influence in terms of grand scenic effects, and from some specific musical borrowings, Traetta had access in Parma to copies and reports of Rameau's operas. To their influence, Traetta added some ingredients of his own, especially a feeling for dramatic colour, in the shape of his melodies and his use of the orchestra. The result was a combination of Italian, French, and German elements, which even expected the Sturm und Drang movement to flourish a few years later, further North.

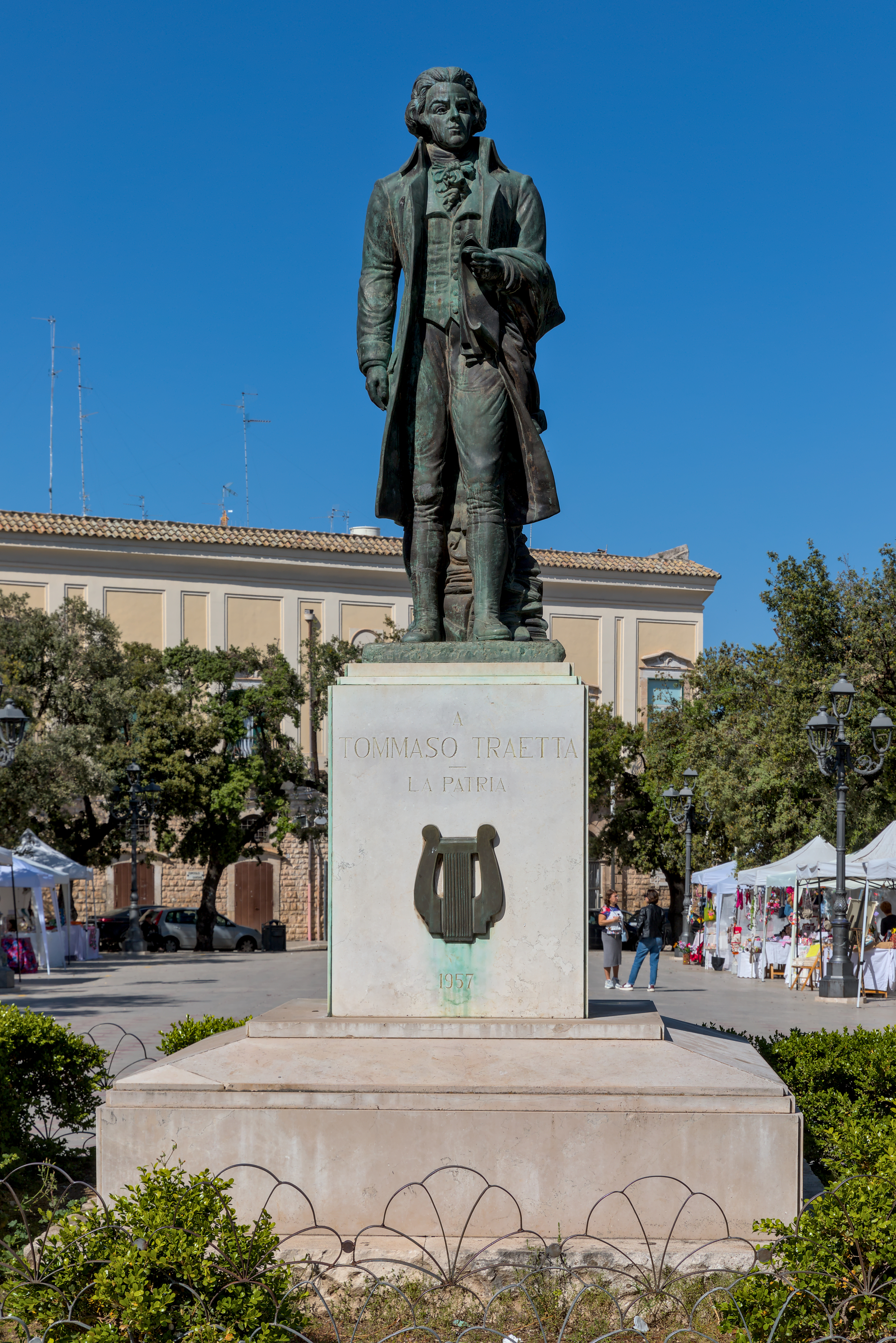
Statue in Bitonto

The first fruit of this Francophilia was the opera Traetta wrote in 1759. Ippolito ed Aricia owes a lot to Rameau's great tragédie lyrique of 1733, Hippolyte et Aricie. But Traetta's is no mere translation of Rameau. Carlo Innocenzo Frugoni, Traetta's librettist in Parma, completely reworked the original French version by abbé Pellegrin, which itself had been based on Racine, in its turn stemming ultimately from ancient Greek roots–the Hippolytus of Euripides. Frugoni kept certain key French elements: the five-act structure as against the customary three; the occasional opportunities for French-style spectacle and effects and, in particular, the dances and divertissements that end each of those five acts; and more elaborate use of the chorus than, for instance, in Hasse and Graun and Jommelli.

Through the following decade, the 1760s, Tommaso Traetta composed music (including opera seria) unceasingly. There was a clutch of comedies as well, and sacred music composed to imperial order. For Traetta served from 1768 to 1775 as music director for Catherine the Great of Russia, to which he moved. Still, opera seria was what her imperial majesty commanded. Traetta's first operas for Catherine the Great seem to have been largely revivals and revisions of his earlier works. In 1772 came Antigona, which reached areas of expression he had not explored before.

The Court Opera of Catherine the Great performed in a theatre close to her apartments inside of the Winter Palace itself, created by the Italian architect Francesco Bartolomeo Rastrelli, architect of many buildings in Saint Petersburg, including the Hermitage. In 1783, sometime after Traetta's departure, she ordered it to be closed and a new one built. Traetta departed Saint Petersburg in 1775, and resumed the opera composer's life, even writing two works for London: Germondo in 1776 and Telemaco in 1777. According to the Traetta Association in Bitonto, he had left Saint Petersburg under threat of assassination by the empress—it seems he was enraged that she insisted on a happy ending for Antigona, and in revenge put music for Polish independence into the final chaconne. He left in time, but his librettist was poisoned.

Traetta was shortly married and had a son, Filippo Traetta, who in 1800 moved to America and became a fairly successful composer. Tommaso Traetta died in April of 1779, in Venice.

== Bibliography ==
- Stabat Mater (Naples) vocal score, Idea Press, Port St. Lucie, 2017, ISBN 978-0-9984873-9-7
- Miserere, vocal score, Idea Press, Port St. Lucie, 2015, ISBN 978-0-9721243-5-5
- Il Cavaliere Errante, vocal score, Idea Press, Port St. Lucie, 2015, ISBN 978-0-9721243-3-1
- Messa in Do, vocal score, Idea Press, Port St. Lucie, 2014, ISBN 978-0-9984873-0-4
- Stabat Mater (Munich), Idea Press, Port St. Lucie, 2015, ISBN 978-0-9721243-2-4

== See also ==
- Traetta Prize
