= Aricina =

Aricina (Ancient Greek: Ἀρικίνη) was an epithet of the Greek goddess Artemis, derived from the town of Aricia (modern Ariccia) in Latium, where she was worshipped.

A tradition of that place related that Hippolytus, after being restored to life by Asclepius, came to Italy, ruled over Aricia, and dedicated a grove there to Artemis. This goddess was believed to be the Taurian Artemis, and her statue at Aricia was considered to be the same as the one which Orestes had brought with him from Tauris.

According to the geographer Strabo, the priest of the Arician Artemis was always a runaway slave, who obtained his office in the following manner: the sacred grove of Artemis contained one tree from which it was not allowed to break off a branch; but if a slave did so, the priest was obliged to fight with him, and if he was conquered and killed, the victorious slave became his successor, and might in his turn be killed by another slave, who then succeeded him.

Suetonius calls the priest rex nemorensis. Ovid, Suetonius, and Pausanias speak of contests of slaves in the grove at Aricia, which seem to refer to the frequent fights between the priest and a slave who tried to obtain his office.
