= Hippolyte et Aricie =

1733 opera by Jean-Philippe Rameau

- Opera by Jean-Philippe Rameau
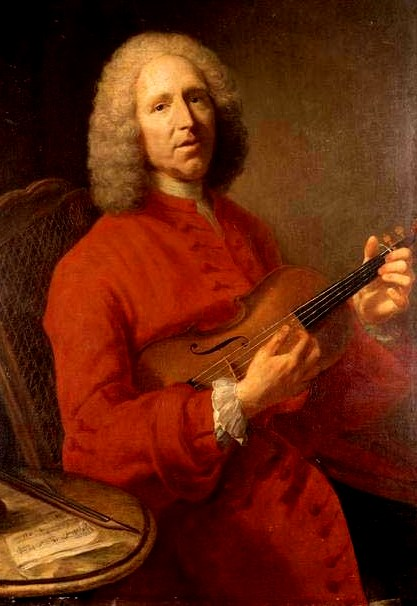
- Portrait of Jean-Philippe Rameau by Jacques Aved in 1728
- Librettist: Simon-Joseph Pellegrin
- Language: French
- Based on: Phèdre by Racine
- Premiere: 1 October 1733; Theatre in the Palais-Royal, Paris

Hippolyte et Aricie (Hippolytus and Aricia) was the first opera by Jean-Philippe Rameau. It was premiered to great controversy by the Académie Royale de Musique at its theatre in the Palais-Royal in Paris on October 1, 1733. The French libretto, by Abbé Simon-Joseph Pellegrin, is based on Racine's tragedy Phèdre. The opera takes the traditional form of a tragédie en musique with an allegorical prologue followed by five acts. Early audiences found little else conventional about the work.

== Background ==
Rameau was almost 50 when he wrote Hippolyte et Aricie and there was little in his life to suggest he was about to embark on a major new career as an opera composer. He was famous for his works on music theory as well as books of harpsichord pieces. The closest he had come to writing dramatic music was composing a few secular cantatas and some popular pieces for the Paris fairs for his friend Alexis Piron. Yet Rameau's eagerness to write an opera is shown by a letter he wrote in October 1727 to Antoine Houdar de la Motte asking for a libretto. It was a strange choice; once famous for providing the texts to such works as André Campra's L'Europe galante (1697) and Marin Marais's Alcyone (1706), Houdar de la Motte had written nothing for the musical stage for almost 20 years. Nothing came of the request and there is no record of any reply, but the fact that Rameau carefully preserved his own letter among his personal papers proves how much the project must have meant to him.

The turning point finally came in 1732. In February that year, Michel Montéclair's tragédie en musique Jephté premiered at the Paris Opéra. Rameau was said to be so impressed by the opera that he approached its librettist, Pellegrin, for a tragédie en musique of his own. The result was Hippolyte et Aricie. In spring 1733, the new opera was given a run-through either at the house of Rameau's patron, La Pouplinière, or at that of the Prince de Carignan. It went into rehearsal at the Opéra in July. Even at this stage, there were problems; Rameau had to cut the second Trio des Parques ("Trio of the Fates") in the second act, because the performers found it too hard to play.

In 1744, Rameau recollected: "I have been a follower of the stage since I was 12 years old. I only began work on an opera when I was 50, I still didn't think I was capable; I tried my hand, I was lucky, I continued."

== Performance history ==
=== Reception: lullistes versus ramistes ===
Tragédie en musique had been invented as a genre by Lully and his librettist Quinault in the 1670s and 1680s. Their works had held the stage ever since and come to be regarded as a French national institution. When Hippolyte et Aricie made its debut, many in the audience were delighted, praising Rameau as "the Orpheus of our century". André Campra was struck by the richness of invention: "There is enough music in this opera to make ten of them; this man will eclipse us all".

Others, however, felt the music was bizarre and dissonant; Hippolyte was the first opera to be described as baroque, then a term of abuse. They saw Rameau's work as an assault on Lullian opera and French musical tradition. As Sylvie Bouissou puts it:

With a single stroke Rameau destroyed everything Lully had spent years in constructing: the proud, chauvinistic and complacent union of the French around one and the same cultural object, the offspring of his and Quinault's genius. Then suddenly the Ramellian aesthetic played havoc with the confidence of the French in their patrimony, assaulted their national opera that they hoped was unchangeable.

Structurally, Hippolyte followed the model established by Lully: a French overture followed by a prologue and five acts, each with its own divertissement containing dances, solos and choruses. Musically, however, it was totally different, especially the orchestration. Rameau had rethought everything apart from the recitative and petits airs (short arias inserted into the recitative), from the symphonies (dances and descriptive music) to the accompaniments to the vocal music (arias, ensembles, choruses). The dominant feeling among those hostile to the opera was that there was an excess of music: too much accompaniment, too many symphonies and too many notes. The music was too difficult to perform, it was too "learned", it lacked true feeling and contained an abundance of dissonances and exaggerated virtuosity.

Audiences and music critics soon split into two factions: the traditionalist lullistes and Rameau's supporters, the ramistes or ramoneurs (a play on the French word for 'chimney sweeps'). Cuthbert Girdlestone described the quarrel thus:

From the performance of Hippolyte, "two violently extreme parties were to be found in France, enraged against each other; the older and the newer music was for each of them a kind of religion for which they took up arms. On the side of Lully were the elderly and the unprofessional; only a few musicians like Mouret joined them, more out of jealousy of the rising star than from devotion to Baptiste. Theorists like Père André, author of an Essai sur le Beau and Abbé Pluche, of Le Spectacle de la Nature fame, were also among the conservative.

There continued to be heated controversy with each new Rameau opera in the 1730s, reaching a peak with the premiere of Dardanus in 1739. Thereafter, it died down as Rameau's reputation became more established, but there were still hints of the dispute as late as the 1750s.

=== Revised versions ===
Rameau revised Hippolyte for a revival in 1742. Apart from small changes in detail, he substantially reduced the role of Phèdre, replacing her act 3 aria "Cruelle mère des amours" with a recitative and completely suppressing her death scene in act 4. These changes were so drastic – the musicologist Sylvie Bouissou describes them as "blasphemy" – that the soprano Mlle Chevalier refused to sing the role of Phèdre. The revised version made its debut on 11 September 1742. In spite of initial criticisms of poor singing, it was a great success, running for 43 performances in 1742 and 1743.

Rameau revised the work again in 1757 for a run which lasted for 24 performances. By this time, his reputation as the foremost French composer was so firmly established that he was confident enough to restore some of the most daring music from the original version, including the "Trio des Parques" and Phèdre's arias. In line with the practice he had adopted since Zoroastre in 1749, he completely cut the prologue. There was another revival at the Paris Opéra in 1767, after Rameau's death, which lasted for 14 performances. After that, the work disappeared from the stage until the 20th century.

=== Modern revivals ===
The first modern performance took place in Geneva in March 1903 under the direction of Émile Jaques-Dalcroze, the founder of Dalcroze Eurhythmics.

Hippolyte returned to the Paris Opéra after a 150-year absence on May 13, 1908. The production did not impress critics such as Henri Quittard and Louis Laloy. They attacked what they regarded as poor staging, acting and choreography, but their harshest criticism was reserved for the alterations to the score made by Vincent d'Indy. Laloy condemned the production for focusing on the recitative at the expense of the arias. He remarked:

How hard it is for some of us to understand an art whose sole aim is to please, not to teach or even move, us. We have utterly forgotten the character of early opera, which is a suite of dances tied together by dialogues and airs, and not, as in the nineteenth century, a dramatic plot decked out with festivities and parades.

There was no attempt to use Baroque instruments and the harpsichord was barely audible in the huge auditorium of the Palais Garnier. The singers suffered from poor intonation despite the assistance of a double string quartet during the recitatives.

Hippolyte et Aricie appeared with increasing frequency on stage and in concert in the second half of the 20th century with performances under Jean-Claude Malgoire and Charles Mackerras, for example. John Eliot Gardiner conducted it at Aix-en-Provence in 1983 and Lyon in 1984 in a staging by Pier Luigi Pizzi. Pizzi's production was taken up by William Christie at the Opéra Comique in Paris in 1985 and by Jean-Claude Malgoire at Lausanne and Reggio Emilia in 1987. Marc Minkowski conducted concert performances at several locations, including Versailles, in 1994. William Christie again conducted the opera at the Palais Garnier, Paris in 1996 in a production by Jean-Marie Villegier which subsequently toured Nice, Montpellier, Caen, Vienna and New York. In the 21st century there have been performances conducted by Jane Glover, Ryan Brown, Emmanuelle Haïm, Raphaël Pichon, György Vashegyi and William Christie (this time at Glyndebourne in 2013).

== The work ==
=== Libretto ===
At the age of 69, Pellegrin had a long career as an opera librettist behind him, so it was unsurprising Rameau should have approached him for his debut, especially given his authorship of Jephté. Distant models for Hippolyte et Aricie were Hippolytus by Euripides and Phaedra by Seneca the Younger, but the most important source was Jean Racine's famous tragedy Phèdre (1677). Such a classic of the Grand Siècle would have been well known to the audience so adapting it might be seen as a deliberate provocation to the conservatives.

There are several differences between Hippolyte et Aricie and Phèdre. Some of these are due to differences in genre between French Classical drama and tragédie en musique. Racine observes the Aristotelian unities of time and space: the action of his play is confined to a single location and takes place within 24 hours. On the other hand, each act in Pellegrin's libretto has a different setting. Pellegrin also provides a happy ending, at least for the lovers Hippolyte and Aricie, whereas Racine is wholly tragic; Hippolyte does not rise from the dead. Pellegrin's drama has a major change in focus: Racine's play centres on Phèdre; she is still important in Pellegrin's version, but he pays much more attention to Thésée. For instance, the entirety of the second act is devoted to Thésée's visit to the Underworld. Graham Sadler writes:

In spite of the opera's title, it is not the youthful lovers Hippolytus and Aricia that dominate the drama but rather the tragic figures of Theseus and Phaedra. That of Theseus is more extensive and powerful. It gains immensely by Pellegrin's decision to devote the whole of Act 2 to the king's selfless journey to Hades.

He goes on to describe Theseus as "one of the most moving and monumental characterizations in Baroque opera."

=== Music ===
The overture begins conventionally enough, in traditionally noble Lullian style, but the technical complexity of the ensuing fugal movement must have disturbed conservative critics worried that Rameau's music would be overly savant (learned). Since the death of Louis XIV the allegorical prologue no longer had any social or political function. Instead, Pellegrin uses it to foreshadow the action of the main opera by showing Destiny ordering Diana and Cupid to unite their efforts to ensure a happy outcome for Hippolyte and Aricie's love. The music of the prologue creates a "light and airy" atmosphere. The two gavottes in the divertissement soon became immensely popular.

The first act introduces the lovers Hippolyte and Aricie, as well as the jealous Phèdre. It begins with Aricie's aria "Temple sacré, séjour tranquille", with its solemn and "religious cast". There follows an extensive dialogue in recitative between Aricie and Hippolyte. Rameau's recitative is like Lully's in that it respects the prosody of the words, but it is more cantabile (song-like) and has more ornamentation, with wider intervals to increase expressivity. Phèdre then gives vent to her jealousy in the aria "Périsse la vaine puissance". The High Priestess of Diana arrives and sings a highly contrapuntal aria with contributions from the chorus. The tonnerre (thunder) which ensues is in the French tradition of the musical depiction of meteorological phenomena. The most famous earlier example was in Marais's Sémélé (1709). Rameau's music is much more intense, containing "Vivaldian tremolos and rapid scale figures."

Pellegrin situated the second act in the Underworld, following the example of Lully's Alceste (1671), Isis (1674), and Proserpine (1680), as well as later works by Desmarets, Marais, and Destouches. Isis, which had been revived on 14 December 1732, was particularly important for Pellegrin as it had a trio for the Fates. The dark colour of this act is enhanced by the use of solely male voices. There are lively and rhythmically inventive dances for the demons contrasted with Thésée's moving invocations to save the life of his friend Pirithous in music in which "the expression of the sentiment is cut down, as it were, to the bone". The act concludes with the famous and controversial second "Trio des Parques", omitted from the premiere because the Opéra's singers and instrumentalists found it too hard to play. It makes use of enharmony, a technique Rameau believed was ideal for "inspiring dread and horror".

At the beginning of act 3, Phèdre implores Venus for mercy in the aria "Cruelle mère des amours" which Girdlestone praises as a "magnificent solo" in spite of its "terribly flat" words. There follows a violent confrontation between Phèdre and Hippolyte then a scene in which Phèdre's confidante Oenone suggests to the king that Hippolyte has attempted to seduce his wife. In a scene of "grim irony", Thésée is forced to suppress his rage while he watches a divertissement of sailors thanking Neptune for his safe return home. The entertainment consists of two rigaudons, two danced airs and the chorus "Que ce rivage rétentisse". The festivities over, Thésée finally has the chance to call on his father Neptune to punish Hippolyte in the invocation "Puissant maître des flots", which Girdlestone regarded as one of the finest solos of the 18th century with its contrast between the violin melody and the slower bass.

Act 4 opens with Hippolyte's monologue "Ah, faut-il qu'en un jour", which looks forward to similarly "elegiac" arias in Rameau's later operas, for example "Lieux désolés" in Les Boréades. The divertissement in the middle of the act celebrates the hunt, with extensive use of horns. The finale is devoted to Hippolyte's confrontation with the sea monster, depicted in stormy music in which the flutes represent blasts of wind. It ends with Phèdre's great lament, which Sylvie Bouissou describes as "one of the finest pages of French Baroque opera".

The final act is split into two tableaux. In the first, Thésée expresses his remorse for his treatment of Hippolyte and recounts Phèdre's suicide. In the words of Cuthbert Girdlestone, "it is a passionate, despairing scena with no fixed form". The scene shifts as Aricie is transported to be reunited with the resurrected Hippolyte in a beautiful rural landscape. This allowed Rameau to paint the scene using the techniques of pastoral music, including a musette (a type of bagpipe). He also displayed his orchestral skill in a chaconne, another feature of many of his later operas. The composer made a concession to popular taste by inserting the "Nightingale aria" (Rossignols amoureux) before the final gavottes. It is an example of an ariette, the French term for a long bravura aria in the Italian style, with the aim of showing off the singer's technical prowess. This particular specimen has no connection with the action of the drama, something Rameau would change with ariettes he wrote later, such as "Que ce séjour est agréable" and "Aux langueurs d'Apollon Daphné se refusa" in Platée.

== Roles ==
Roles, voice types, premiere cast
Role	Voice type	Premiere cast, 1 October 1733 Conductor: François Francœur
Hippolyte (Hippolytus)	haute-contre	Denis-François Tribou
Aricie (Aricia)	soprano	Marie Pélissier
Phèdre (Phaedra)	soprano	Marie Antier
Thésée (Theseus)	bass	Claude-Louis-Dominique Chassé de Chinais
Jupiter	bass	Jean Dun fils
Pluton (Pluto)	bass	Jean Dun fils
Diane (Diana)	soprano	Mlle Eremans
Œnone, Phèdre's confidante	soprano	Mlle Monville
Arcas, friend to Thésée	taille	Louis-Antoine Cuvilliers
Mercure (Mercury)	taille	Dumast
Tisiphone	taille	Louis-Antoine Cuvilliers
L'Amour, Cupid	soprano	Pierre Jélyotte
La Grande-Prêtresse de Diane, High Priestess of Diana	soprano	Mlle Petitpas
Parques, three Fates	bass, taille, haute-contre	Cuignier, Cuvilliers, and Jélyotte
Un suivant de l'Amour, follower of Cupid	haute-contre	Pierre Jélyotte
Une bergère, a shepherdess	soprano	Mlle Petitpas
Une matelote, a female sailor	soprano	Mlle Petitpas
Une chasseresse, a huntress	soprano	Mlle Petitpas
Spirits of the underworld, people of Troezen, sailors, huntsmen, nymphs of Diana, shepherds and shepherdesses, people of the forest (chorus)

The ballet corps included Marie-Anne de Cupis de Camargo (La Camargo).

== Instrumentation ==
The opera uses an orchestra with the following instrumentation: two flutes, two oboes, two bassoons, two musettes, two horns, two trumpets, timpani and other percussion, strings (with divided violas), and harpsichord.

== Synopsis ==
=== Prologue ===
An overture in the typical Lullian style precedes the allegorical prologue set in the Forest of Erymanthus where Diana (Diane in the opera) and Cupid (L'Amour) are arguing who will rule over the forest dwellers. The quarrel is settled by Jupiter who decrees that Love will reign over their hearts for one day every year. Diana vows to look after Hippolytus (Hippolyte) and Aricia (Aricie).

=== Act 1 ===
The temple of Diana in Troezen

The story concerns the Greek hero Theseus, King of Athens (Thésée in the opera), his wife Phaedra (Phèdre) and Theseus' son by another woman, Hippolytus. The latter is in love with a young woman, Aricia, but she is the daughter of Theseus's enemy, Pallas. Aricia is the last of the Pallantids, and as such is held captive by Theseus and has been sentenced to take a vow of chastity to Diana. Before she does so, she and Hippolytus reveal mutual love to each other and, defying the will of Phaedra, the priestesses of Diana proclaim that it is unlawful to force her to dedicate her heart to the goddess when it already belongs to another. Phaedra, incensed by the disobedience of the priestesses, threatens to destroy the temple. The high priestess appeals to the gods, and the goddess Diana descends and rebukes Phaedra, forcing her to leave the temple. Phaedra leaves with her only confidant, Oenone, and vents her frustration at the situation. Phaedra, Theseus second wife, has been nursing an illicit desire for her stepson. Arcas brings news that Theseus has made a journey to the Underworld and is likely dead. This means Phaedra may pursue Hippolytus and offer him the marriage and the crown of Athens.

=== Act 2 ===
Hades, the Underworld

Theseus descends to Hades to rescue his friend Pirithous, who has been captured when he tried to seduce Pluto (Pluton)'s wife, Proserpina (Proserpine). Theseus has a special advantage: his father, the god Neptune, has promised to answer his prayers on three occasions during his life. The first prayer Theseus makes is to be allowed to reach Hades. At the entrance, he fights with the Fury Tisiphone, but makes it through to Pluto's court. Pluto denies Theseus' request to trade or share the fate of his friend, but allows a trial. When Theseus again loses, he calls on Neptune to free him (his second prayer), and Pluto is powerless to hold him back. As Theseus leaves, however, the Fates (Les Parques) foretell that Theseus may leave Hades but he will find Hell in his own household.

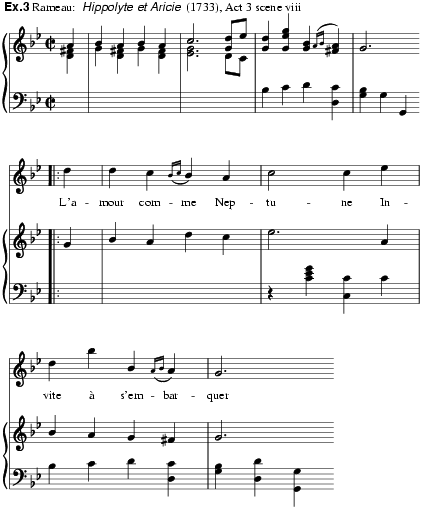
Music from act 3, scene 8

=== Act 3 ===
Theseus's palace by the sea

Phaedra is the daughter of King Minos and of Pasiphae, the daughter of sun god, Helios, and of the Oceanid nymph Perse. Phaedra is living a life cursed by Venus for the mistakes of her mother, Pasiphae, who had an affair with the Cretan Bull, giving birth to the Minotaur, who was half man, half bull. Phaedra is in love with her stepson, Hippolytus, who offers her his condolences and swears fidelity to her as a queen as well as abdicating the throne in favor of the son of Theseus and Phaedra, his half brother. He wants to be with Aricia above all else. As she witnesses her dreams crumbling, Phaedra confesses her passion to her stepson. Hippolytus is shocked and curses her. Phaedra tries to kill herself with a sword but Hippolytus snatches it from her. At this moment, Theseus arrives unexpectedly. He is unsure what to make of the scene, but fears Hippolytus was trying to rape his wife. Phaedra rushes off and Hippolytus nobly refuses to denounce his stepmother. But this only serves to increase his father's suspicions, now reinforced by Phaedra's confidante, Oenone. Theseus finally decides to use his last prayer to Neptune to punish Hippolytus.

=== Act 4 ===
A grove sacred to Diana by the sea

Hippolytus realizes he must go into exile and Aricia vows to go with him as his wife with the goddess Diana as their witness. The forest people celebrate Diana. A monster suddenly emerges from the sea – the instrument of Theseus's punishment. Hippolytus tries to fight it but disappears in a cloud of flames. Phaedra arrives, distraught, and admits she is the cause of Hippolytus's death.

=== Act 5 ===
A grove sacred to Diana by the sea

Theseus has learnt the truth from Phaedra, just before she poisoned herself. Full of remorse, he too threatens suicide but Neptune reveals that his son is still alive, thanks to Diana's protection. However, Theseus will never see him again.

The forest of Aricia, Italy

Aricia wakes up, still mourning Hippolytus. Diana tells her she has found a husband for the girl, but Aricia is inconsolable until the goddess reveals Hippolytus, alive and well. Diana appoints Hippolytus to be the king of her people in this land, and the opera ends with general rejoicing.

== Parodies and influence on later operas ==
The opera was parodied twice at the Comédie-Italienne, Paris, once by François Riccoboni and Jean-Antoine Romagnesi (premiered 30 November 1733) and then, during the 1742 revival, by Charles-Simon Favart (11 October 1742). Both parodies went under the title Hippolyte et Aricie.

Carlo Innocenzo Frugoni provided an Italian version of the libretto for Tommaso Traetta, a composer who experimented with mixing French and Italian operatic styles. Traetta's Ippolito ed Aricia was first performed at the Teatro Ducale, Parma on 9 May 1759. Frugoni's version of Pellegrin's libretto was also the basis for a handful of later operas: Ignaz Holzbauer's Ippolito ed Aricia (Mannheim, 1759), Giovanni Paisiello's Fedra (Naples, 1 January 1788), and Sebastiano Nasolini's Teseo a Stige (Florence, 28 December 1790).

== Recordings ==
=== Audio (complete opera) ===
Year	Cast: Thésée, Phèdre, Hippolyte, Aricie	Conductor, chorus, orchestra	Label, notes
1966	John Shirley-Quirk, Janet Baker, Robert Tear, Angela Hickey	Anthony Lewis; St. Anthony Singers, English Chamber Orchestra	Decca: L'Oiseau-Lyre, 3 LPs (reissued on 2 CDs in 1995)
1978	Ulrik Cold, Carolyn Watkinson, Ian Caley, Arleen Auger	Jean-Claude Malgoire; Chorus of the English Bach Festival, La Grand Ecurie et la Chambre du Roy	CBS, 3 LPs (a fusion of the 1733, 1742 and 1757 versions)
1994	Russell Smythe, Bernarda Fink, Jean-Paul Fouchécourt, Véronique Gens	Marc Minkowski; Les Musiciens du Louvre	Deutsche Grammophon Archiv, 3 CDs
1997	Laurent Naouri, Lorraine Hunt, Mark Padmore, Anna Maria Panzarella	William Christie; Les Arts Florissants	Erato, 3 CDs

=== Video (complete opera) ===
Year	Cast (as above)	Conductor, stage director, chorus, orchestra	Label, notes
2014	Stéphane Degout, Sarah Connolly, Topi Lehtipuu, Anne-Catherine Gillet	Emmanuelle Haïm; Ivan Alexandre; Chorus and orchestra of Le Concert d'Astrée	Erato 2 DVDs
2014	Stéphane Degout, Sarah Connolly, Ed Lyon, Christiane Karg	William Christie, Jonathan Kent, Orchestra of the Age of Enlightenment	Opus Arte 1 DVD
2019	Gyula Orendt, Magdalena Kožená, Reinoud Van Mechelen, Anna Prohaska	Simon Rattle, Aletta Collins, Ólafur Elíasson, Freiburger Barockorchester, Staatsopernchor	EuroArts 1 Blu-Ray/2 DVD
2020	Stéphane Degout, Sylvie Brunet-Grupposo, Reinoud van Mechelen, Elsa Benoit	Raphaël Pichon; Jeanne Candel; Pygmalion; Pygmalion	Recorded on 14 November 2020 at the Opéra Comique in Paris
2026	Helena Waterous, Allegra Durante, Liz Kiger, Collibrina, Brian Alvarado, Hannah Shanefield, Tis Kaoru Zamler-Carhart	Liz Kiger, Matthew Kyle Levine; Samn Johnon	Releasing 17 August 2026

== Sources ==
=== Scores and libretti ===
- 1733 printed score: Hippolite et Aricie, Tragédie Mise en Musique par M^{r}. Rameau, Representée par l'Academie Royale de Musique Le Jeudy Premier Octobre 1733 (partition in folio), Paris, De Gland, 1733 (in French) – via Gallica
- 1742 libretto: Hippolyte et Aricie, Tragédie, Représentée par l'Académie Royale de Musique; Pour la premiere fois, le jeudi premier octobre 1733. Remise au théâtre le mardi 11 septembre 1742, Paris, Ballard, 1742 (in French) – via Gallica

=== Secondary sources ===
- Ivan A. Alexandre, "Rameau: Hippolyte et Aricie", essay in the booklet to Minkowski's 1994 recording of Hippolyte et Aricie (listed in the recording section above) (in French)
- Sylvie Bouissou, Jean-Philippe Rameau: Musicien des Lumières (Fayard, 2014) (in French)
- Cuthbert Girdlestone, Jean-Philippe Rameau: His Life and Works (originally published 1957; revised edition published by Dover, 1969)
- Harry Haskell, The Early Music Revival: A History (Dover, 1996)
- Graham Sadler, "Jean-Philippe Rameau" in The New Grove: French Baroque Masters (first published 1980; paperback edition Macmillan, 1986)
- Graham Sadler, article on Hippolyte et Aricie in the Viking Opera Guide, ed. Amanda Holden (Viking, 1993)
- Graham Sadler, "A diffident débutant? Rameau and the premiere of Hippolyte et Aricie", essay in the booklet to Minkowski's 1994 recording of Hippolyte et Aricie (listed in the recording section above)
- Gloria Staffieri, "Rameau: Hippolyte et Aricie", essay in the booklet to Minkowski's 1994 recording of Hippolyte et Aricie (listed in the recording section above) (in Italian)
- Joachim Steinheuer, "Rameau: Hippolyte et Aricie", essay in the booklet to Minkowski's 1994 recording of Hippolyte et Aricie (listed in the recording section above) (in German)
- "Hippolyte et Aricie", operabaroque.fr (in French)]
- "Visual documentation of the 1908 revival", Gallica
