= Carlo Innocenzo Frugoni =

Italian poet (1692–1768)

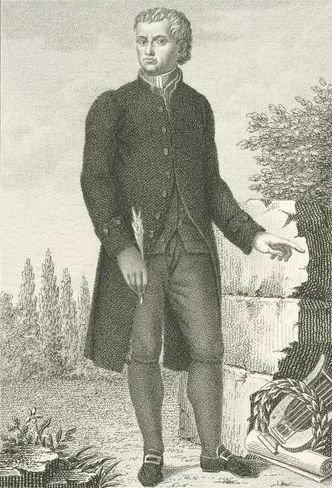
Carlo Innocenzo Frugoni on a stipple engraving by Luigi Rados.

Carlo Innocenzo Frugoni (21 November 1692 – 20 December 1768) was an Italian poet and librettist. As a poet Frugoni was one of the best of the school of the Arcadian Academy, and his lyrics and pastorals had great facility and elegance. His collected works were published at Parma in 10 volumes in 1799, and a more complete edition appeared at Lucca in the same year in 15 volumes.

== Biography ==
Born at Genoa, he was originally destined for the church and at the age of fifteen, against his will, was shut up in a convent. In the following year he was forced to make monastic vows, but had no liking for this life. He acquired considerable reputation as an elegant writer both of Latin and Italian prose and verse; and from 1716 to 1724 he filled the chairs of rhetoric at Brescia, Rome, Genoa, Bologna and Modena successively, attracting by his brilliant fluency a large number of students at each university.

Through Cardinal Bentivoglio he was recommended to Antonio Francesco Farnese, Duke of Parma, who appointed him his poet laureate; and he remained at the court of Parma until Antonio's death, after which he returned to Genoa. Shortly afterwards, through Bentivoglio's influence, he obtained from the pope the remission of his monastic vows, and succeeded in recovering a portion of his paternal inheritance. After the peace of Aix-la-Chapelle he returned to the court of Parma, and there devoted the later years of his life chiefly to poetical composition.

He corresponded with Francesco Algarotti during the genesis of Jean Racine's dramatic tragedy entitled Phèdre into Ippolito ed Aricia an opera by Tommaso Traetta. Among his pupils was the abate Marco Cappello, who wrote mainly burlesque poetry.

== Sources ==
- Marco Russo, Tommaso Traetta: i Libretti della Riforma - Parma 1759-61, Facoltà di Lettere di Trento, Trento 2005;
- Marco Russo, Tommaso Traetta: Maestro di cappella napoletano, Edizioni S. Marco dei Giustiniani, Genova 2006.
- Fabrizio Cassoni, Gianfranco Spada, Le Feste d'Imeneo, Tommaso Traetta a Parma, Traettiana, London 2010.
