= Hippolytus (play) =

Ancient Greek tragedy by Euripides

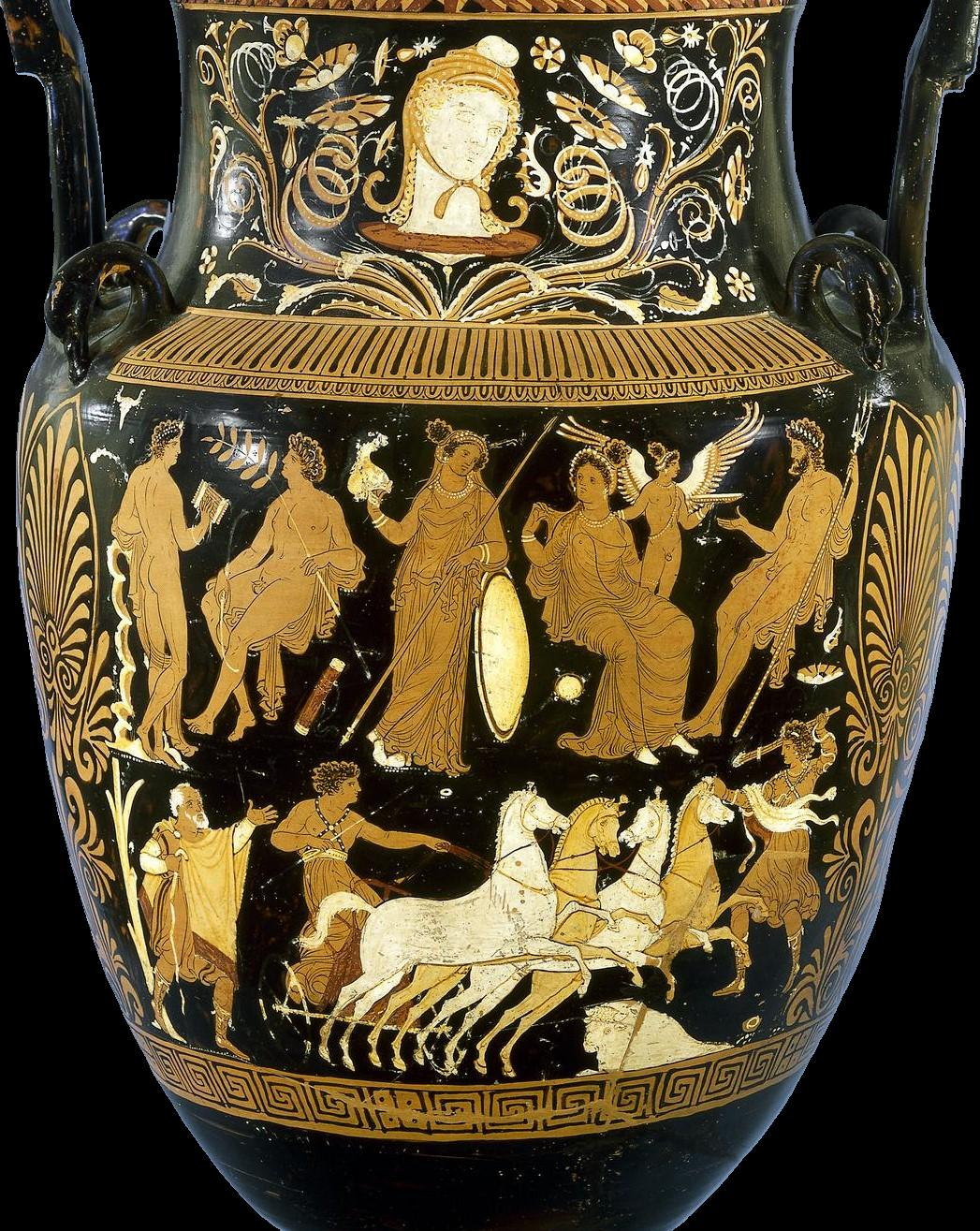
- Ancient Greek vase depicting Hippolytus, c. 340 BC – c. 320 BC
- Original language: Ancient Greek
- Written by: Euripides
- Chorus: 1. Troezenian women 2. Slaves to Hippolytus
- Characters: Aphrodite; Hippolytus; Servant; Nurse; Phaedra; Theseus; Messenger; Artemis
- Genre: Tragedy
- Setting: Before the royal palace at Troezen

Premiere
- Place: Athens

Hippolytus (Ancient Greek: Ἱππόλυτος, Hippolytos) is an Ancient Greek tragedy by Euripides, based on the myth of Hippolytus, son of Theseus. The play was first produced for the City Dionysia of Athens in 428 BC and won first prize as part of a trilogy. The text is extant.

Euripides first treated the myth in a previous play, Hippolytos Kalyptomenos (Ἱππόλυτος καλυπτόμενος – Hippolytus Veiled), which is lost, and survives only in fragments. What is known of it is based on echoes found in other ancient writings. The earlier play, and the one that has survived are both titled Hippolytus, but in order to distinguish the two they have traditionally been given the names, Hippolytos Kalyptomenos and Hippolytus Stephanophoros (Ἱππόλυτος στεφανοφόρος – "Hippolytus the wreath bearer").

It is thought that the contents to the lost Hippolytos Kalyptomenos portrayed a woman, Phaedra, reduced to shamelessness by a god, and not given the dignity of being able to resist the spell that Aphrodite has placed on her. Athenians may have been offended by a determinedly lustful heroine of a tragedy offering herself directly to Hippolytus. Such a weakness in Phaedra's character, may have caused Hippolytus' desire for purity to be less effectively portrayed. In 428 B.C., Euripides offered to the festival of Dionysus a second version of the story, in which Phaedra resists Aphrodite as best she can. This is the version that has survived.

Euripides revisits the myth in Hippolytos Stephanophoros, its title refers to the garlands Hippolytus wears as a worshipper of Artemis. In this version Phaedra fights against her own sexual desires, which have been incited by Aphrodite.

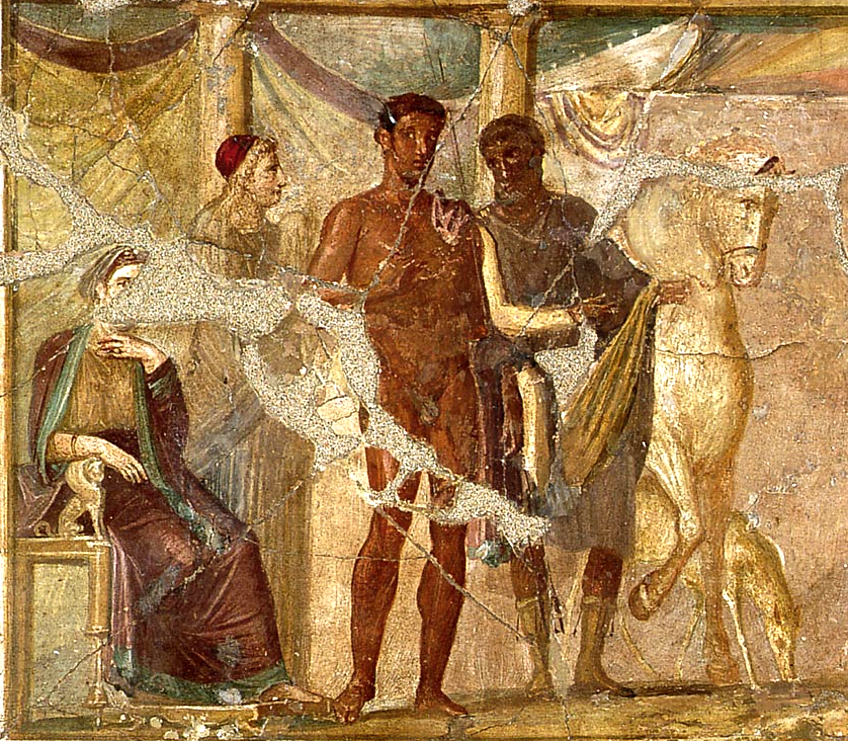
Hippolytus and Phaedra, antique fresco from Pompeii

== Synopsis ==
The play is set in Troezen, a coastal town in the north-eastern Peloponnese. Theseus, the king of Athens, is serving a year's voluntary exile after having murdered a local king and his sons. His illegitimate son is Hippolytus, whose mother was one of the Amazons. Hippolytus has been trained since childhood by the king of Troezen, Pittheus. Hippolytus has a step-mother, Phaedra, who lives in Athens.

At the opening of the play Aphrodite, Goddess of love, explains that Hippolytus has sworn chastity and refuses to revere her. Instead, he honours the Goddess of the hunt, Artemis. This has led Aphrodite to initiate a plan of vengeance on Hippolytus. When Hippolytus went to Athens two years previously Aphrodite caused Phaedra to fall in love with him.

Hippolytus appears with his followers and shows reverence to a statue of Artemis, a chaste goddess. A servant warns him about slighting Aphrodite, but Hippolytus refuses to listen.

The chorus, consisting of young married women of Troezen, enters and describes how Theseus's wife, Phaedra, has not eaten or slept in three days. Phaedra, sickly, appears with her nurse. After an agonizing discussion, Phaedra finally confesses why she is ill: she loves Hippolytus. The nurse and the chorus are shocked. Phaedra explains that she must starve herself and die with her honour intact and to save Theseus from shame. However, the nurse quickly retracts her initial response and tells Phaedra that she has a magical charm to cure her. However, in an aside she reveals different plans.

The nurse, after making Hippolytus swear not to tell anyone, informs Hippolytus of Phaedra's desire and suggests that Hippolytus consider yielding to her. He reacts with a furious tirade and threatens to tell his father, Theseus, everything as soon as he arrives. Phaedra realizes disaster has fallen. After making the chorus swear secrecy, she goes inside and hangs herself.

Theseus returns and discovers his wife's dead body. Because the chorus is sworn to secrecy, they cannot tell Theseus why she killed herself. Theseus discovers a letter on Phaedra's body, which falsely asserts that she was raped by Hippolytus. Enraged, Theseus curses his son either to death or at least exile. To execute the curse, Theseus calls upon his father, the god Poseidon, who has promised to grant his son three wishes. Hippolytus enters and protests his innocence but cannot tell the truth because of the binding oath that he swore. Taking Phaedra's letter as proof, Hippolytus proudly defends his innocence, saying that he has never looked at any woman with sexual desire. Theseus does not believe his son and still exiles him. As Hippolytus is departing he swears that if he is lying then Zeus should strike him down on the spot.

The chorus sings a lament for Hippolytus.

A messenger enters and describes a gruesome scene to Theseus; as Hippolytus got in his chariot to leave the kingdom, a bull roared out of the sea, frightening his horses, which dashed his chariot among the rocks, dragging Hippolytus behind. Hippolytus seems to be dying. The messenger protests Hippolytus' innocence, but Theseus refuses to believe him.

Theseus is glad that Hippolytus is suffering and about to die. But then the goddess, Artemis, appears and rages at Theseus for killing his own son. She brutally tells him the truth and that Aphrodite was behind all their suffering, because she felt disrespected by Hippolytus's pride in his chastity. Artemis states that there was no rape, Phaedra had lied, and Theseus' son is innocent. Theseus is devastated by this revelation. Hippolytus is carried in physically battered and barely clinging to life. In the last moments of the play, Hippolytus forgives his father, kind words are exchanged between father and son, and then Hippolytus dies. Theseus is then left living to dwell on the fact that he killed his beloved son.

== Critical reception ==
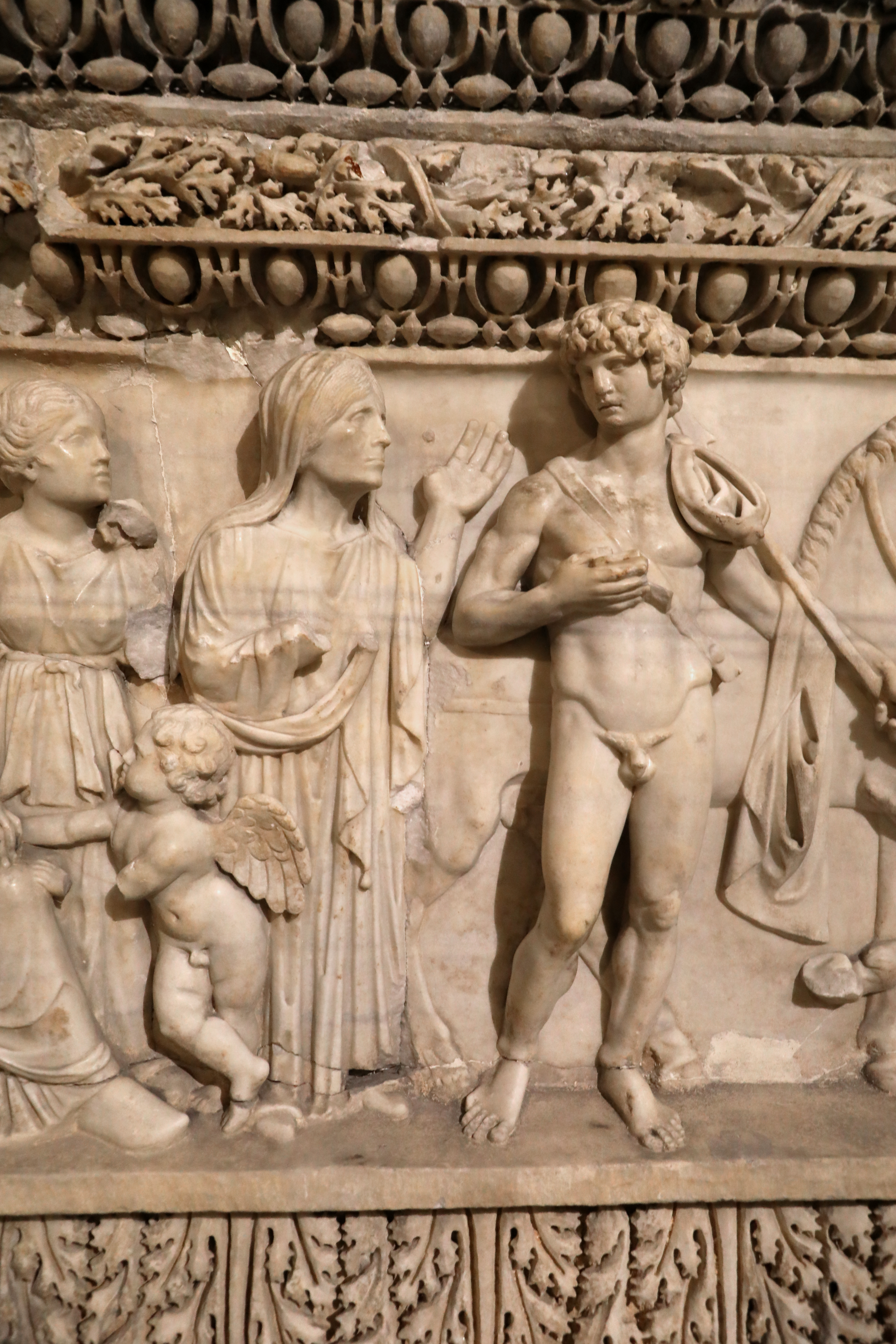
Hippolytus and the nurse from a Roman 2nd-century sarcophagus from Tripoli, now in the Istanbul Archaeology Museums.

In this play, all characters, humans and gods, have blindnesses that prevent them from understanding others, and these blindnesses combine to result in tragedy. The clash between Phaedra and Hippolytus is a conflict between what is repugnant and depraved — a woman sexually desiring her step son–and what is inhuman and arrogant–a young man that finds sexuality repellant. Hippolytus is possessed by a desire for purity, which is represented by the goddess Artemis. Hippolytus describes the goddess' purifying power in terms of the ancient Greek concept of sophrosyne, which is translated in the script variously as the situation requires–"wisdom, chastity, moderation, character". This play illustrates that it is not possible for a person to be sophron and also a devotee of Aphrodite.

However, like any other famous play, Hippolytus has a variety of different interpretations. Traditionally, the play was generally agreed upon to (1) showcase a symbolic conflict of chastity vs. desire, which is seen through Artemis and Aphrodite, respectively and (2) highlight Hippolytus as the main character, while Phaedra exists as its foil. This sentiment was echoed by the chief critics, Wilamowitz-Mollendorf, Louis Meridier, and Max Pohlenz; while the three disagreed on other parts of the play, consensus was attained in those fields.

Apart from that, there were multiple points of debate, which were mainly centered on Hippolytus' character's reception at the time. While some scholars saw Hippolytus' excessive chasteness to be his downfall, others interpreted Hippolytus' rejection of man's desire as proof of his ascension to the spiritual ideal of purity and consequently saw his death as a triumph. It is also suspected that Hippolytus' character received poor reception from ancient Athenians, as his behavior would have likely been seen as unnatural and consequently frowned upon. This is also inferred in lines 99-109 of Hippolytus, which showcases a conversation between Hippolytus and a servant who questions Hippolytus' abrasiveness toward Aphrodite:

Servant

How then no word for a high and mighty goddess?

Hippolytus

[100] Which? Careful lest your tongue commit some slip.

Servant

pointing to the statue of Aphrodite

The goddess here, who stands beside your gate.

Hippolytus

I greet her from afar, for I am pure.

Servant

Yet she's revered and famous among mortals.

Hippolytus

I do not like a god worshipped at night.

Servant

[107] My son, to honor the gods is only just.

Hippolytus

Men have their likes, in gods and men alike.

Servant

I wish you fortune—and the good sense you need!

David Grene, an Irish American professor and expert in classics, offers a reinterpretation of the play. Primarily, Grene argues that Hippolytus is secondary to Phaedra, who is acting out Aphrodite's will. Out of anger for Hippolytus' devotion to Artemis and attitude to Aphrodite, Aphrodite transforms Phaedra into a lustful woman that is "seized with a dreadful longing" to her own stepson. When Phaedra fails, she concocts a plan to indirectly cause Hippolytus' death by blaming him of raping her in her suicide note, which leads to her husband calling upon Poseidon to curse Hippolytus. Thus, the philosophical themes in Hippolytus are heavily grounded on Phaedra and her desire for Hippolytus, pointing toward her role as the main character. Moreover, from a structural and content standpoint, Grene argues that the play's tensions are mainly centered on Phaedra, which alludes to how Euripides intended for her to act as the central character; otherwise, he would have wasted time with irrelevant details on her.

Grene's points are also supported by the consistencies in both editions of Hippolytus. Euripides eventually revised his first version, ostensibly due to unfavorable reception from the Athenian audience. In the first release, Phaedra directly confesses to Hippolytus, and the Nurse does not exist; this play is now lost and only exists in fragments. In the second variant, Euripides adds the Nurse to act as the middleman between Hippolytus and Phaedra; it follows that the Nurse is the one responsible for disclosing his stepmother's attraction to him. Despite the changes, Grene contests that nothing essential was added into either character and Phaedra is aware of the confession anyhow. Either way, Grene underlines that the main framework of the plot stays constant—and it is how the embodiment of Aphrodite (love) operates on Phaedra and ultimately destroys Hippolytus. In addition to this, Grene points out that Hippolytus does not actually do much dramatic movement—he just suffers punishment—and it is Phaedra who is the main subject.

Grene's essay was critical in setting the foundation for Hippolytus' interpretation, especially since Grene boldly challenged past, traditional views. While Lester G. Crocker acknowledges this, he also points out several flaws in Grene's argumentation. One of these problems includes Grene's arbitrary justifications, as Crocker identified how Grene's structural analysis decidedly omitted the Prologue and Epilogue. Because of this, Grene was able to say that Phaedra occupied most of the play. Yet, Crocker's reading found that even if these exclusions were set, each character still occupied the same amount of space and stage time. Furthermore, if the Prologue and Epilogue were rightfully included, Hippolytus would be onstage more than his stepmother.

Besides methodological errors, Crocker proposes a different understanding of the play. He argues that, because Hippolytus had equal amounts of conflicts in both its titular character and Phaedra, the tragic meaning of the play transcends the individual tragedy of the protagonists. He claims that it is not a question of whose conflict is more important; instead, both conflicts come together to form a whole view. Crocker asserts that Hippolytus is more than a symbol for chastity, and that Phaedra is more than a symbol of lust. In Hippolytus' case, he is guilty of an excessive pursuit toward an ideal that humans cannot attain, since it is against man's nature to totally reject sex; by trying to become the embodiment of purity, Hippolytus tries to become more than human—attempting to be on par with gods. Meanwhile, Phaedra has an internalized conflict between two opposites: self-restraint and desire; although she tries to defy her libido and remain chaste, her desire for sex—coupled with her husband's absence and Aphrodite's imposition—lead to her ultimate failure.

Yet, taking a broad view, Hippolytus and Phaedra are both engaged in the same struggle between their primitive desire and the ideal they are aspiring to. Considering this, Crocker ultimately says that the tragic protagonist of the play is Hippolytus due to how he experiences fundamental aloneness, his storyline involved peripeteia, his punishment is disproportionate to the crime he committed, and he experienced true anagnorisis. Hippolytus' drive to be perfectly chaste is an existential crime, and the main ironies in the play concern him; in his pursuit to rise above, he ends up falling to his death—quite literally. In comparison, Phaedra's crime has more rationality than Hippolytus', as she is aware of the forbidden nature of her desire. Despite this, she is a victim to the gods' vengeance, and she still commits the crime of confessing her love for Hippolytus—irrespective of how she knows better. According to Crocker, instead of having tragic guilt, Phaedra's actions thus lead to ethical guilt. Because of this, he sees her as falling short of having full tragic stature.

Scholar Rachel Bruzzone argued in 2012 that Pygmalion in Book X of Ovid's Metamorphoses and Hippolytus share certain characteristics. The main antagonist of both stories is Aphrodite, who seeks revenge on both for insulting her by remaining virgins. They are also both obsessed with remaining pure. Both are misogynistic with Hippolytus believing that women are morally corrupt and will ruin his pureness. Pygmalion believes the same in that women are just lust-filled creatures that will ruin his pureness. But Pygmalion unlike Hippolytus does desire a woman, just one he deems as perfect which is one that does not speak, is nameless and compliant. Both have a love affair with a statue. Hippolytus's love affair is more subtle where he just says that his wife is a statue but Pygmalion actually marries his statue, which is brought to life.

== Texts ==
- Barrett, W. S. (ed.), Euripides, Hippolytos, edited with Introduction and Commentary (Oxford: Clarendon Press, 1964; Toronto: Oxford University Press, 1964)

== Translations ==
- Robert Potter, 1781, verse full text
- A. Mary F. Robinson, 1881, verse
- Edward P. Coleridge, 1891, prose: full text
- Gilbert Murray, 1911, verse: full text
- Arthur Way, 1912, verse
- H.D., verse, 1927
- Augustus T. Murray, 1931, prose
- Moses Hadas and John McLean, 1936 - prose
- David Grene, 1942, verse
- Philip Vellacott, 1953, verse
- F. L. Lucas, 1954, verse ISBN 9780452011724
- Robert Bagg, 1973. ISBN 978-0-19-507290-7
- David Rudkin, 1981 Heinemann
- David Kovacs, 1994, prose: full text
- John Davie, 1996, prose
- David Lan, 1998
- James Morwood, 1998
- Anne Carson, 2006. Grief Lessons: Four Plays by Euripides. New York Review Books Classics. ISBN 1-59017-180-2.
- Diane Arnson Svarlien, 2007. Euripides: Alcestis, Medea, Hippolytus. Hackett Classics.
- George Theodoridis, 2010, prose: full text
- Ian C. Johnston, 2016, verse: full text
- Rachel Kitzinger, 2016 - verse
- Brian Vinero, 2024, rhymed verse:

== Adaptations ==
- The tragic play Phèdre by Racine (1677)
- The film Phaedra (1962), incorporating elements of the two versions written by Euripides
