= Hippolytus of Athens =

Son of Theseus in Greek mythology

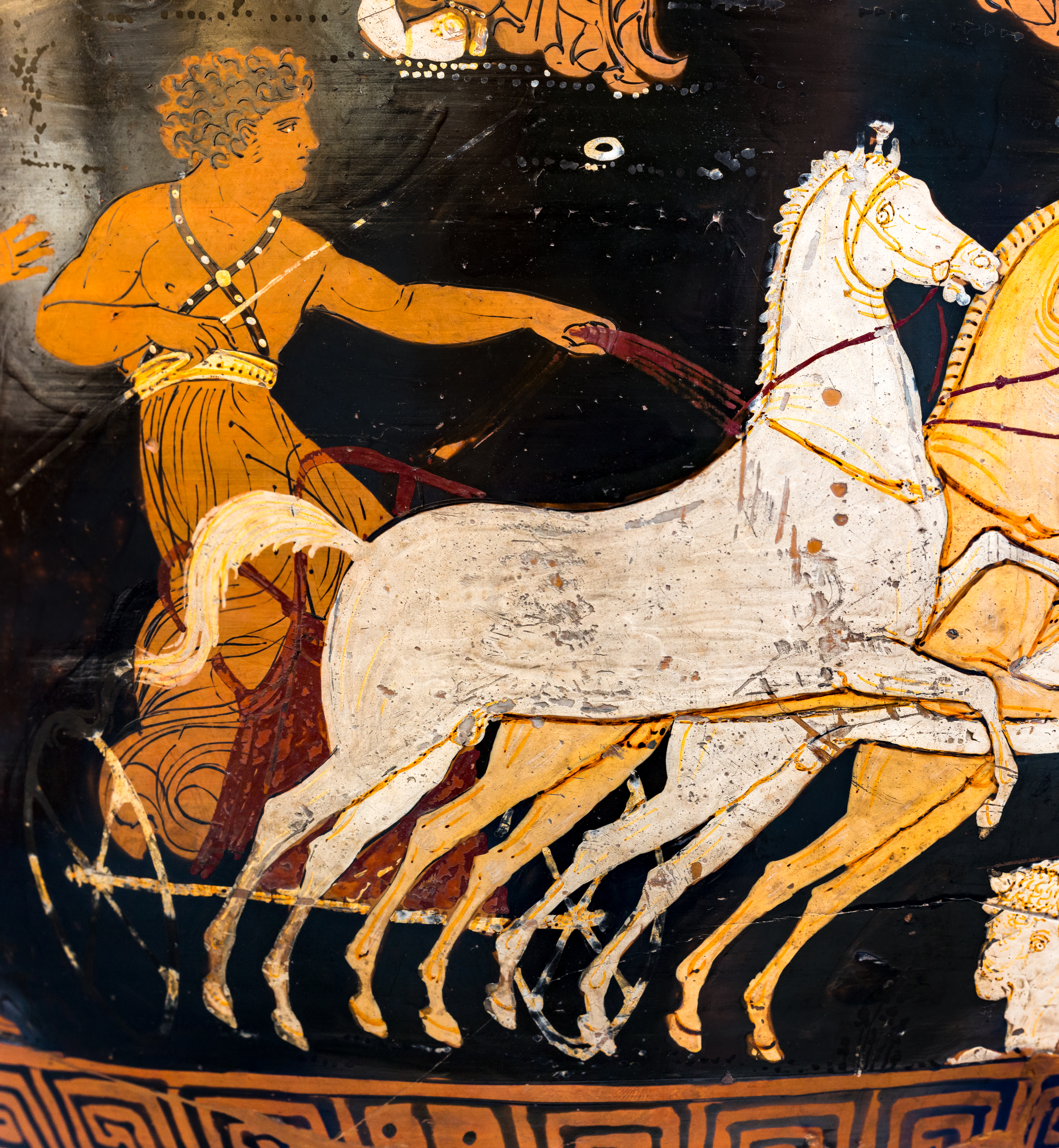
Detail of the Hippolytus volute-krater (bowl for mixing wine and water), c. 340 BC – c. 320 BC, British Museum.

Hippolytus (Ancient Greek: Ἱππόλυτος, romanized: Hippolutos, lit. 'unleasher of horses'; /hɪˈpɒlɪtəs/) in Greek mythology is the son of Theseus and an Amazon, either Hippolyta or Antiope. His downfall at the hands of Aphrodite is recounted by the playwright Euripides. Other versions of the story have also survived.

== Etymology ==
The meaning of Hippolytus' name may be understood ironically. Ἱππό- translates to 'horse', and the element -λυτος (from λύω 'loosen, destroy') suggests the adjective λυτός, -ή, -όν 'which may be undone, destroyed'. His name thereby takes on the prophetic meaning 'destroyed by horses'.

== Premise of the myth ==
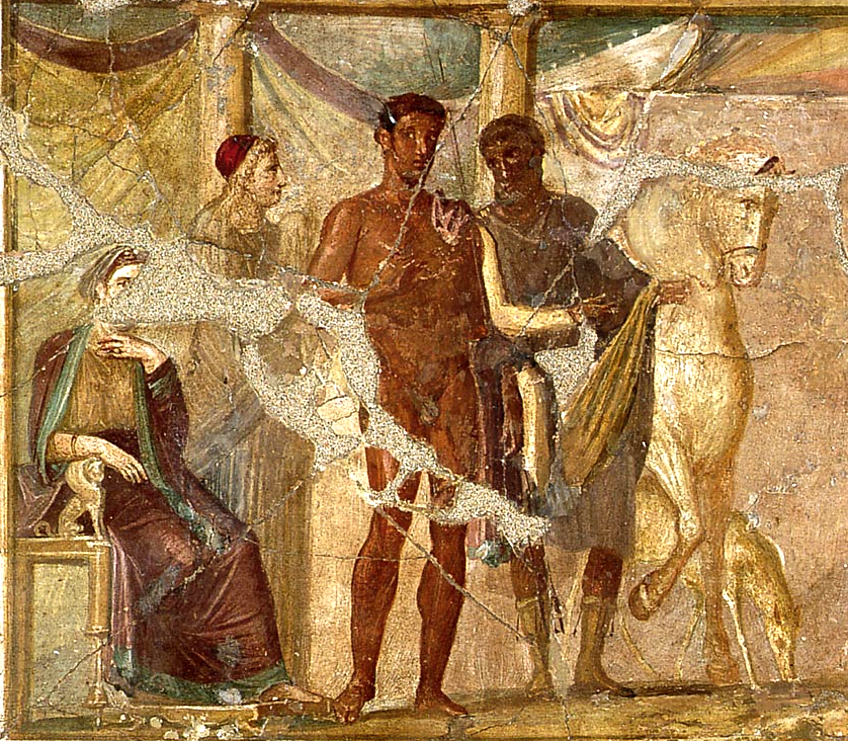
Hippolytus and Phaedra, antique fresco from Pompeii

Hippolytus is a hunter and sportsman who is more inclined towards hunting than towards marriage and love. In consequence, he scrupulously worships Artemis, the virgin huntress, and refuses to honor Aphrodite. Offended by this neglect, Aphrodite causes Phaedra, Hippolytus’ stepmother, to fall in love with him; Hippolytus rejects Phaedra's advances, setting events in motion that lead to his death in a fall from his chariot.

== Euripides ==
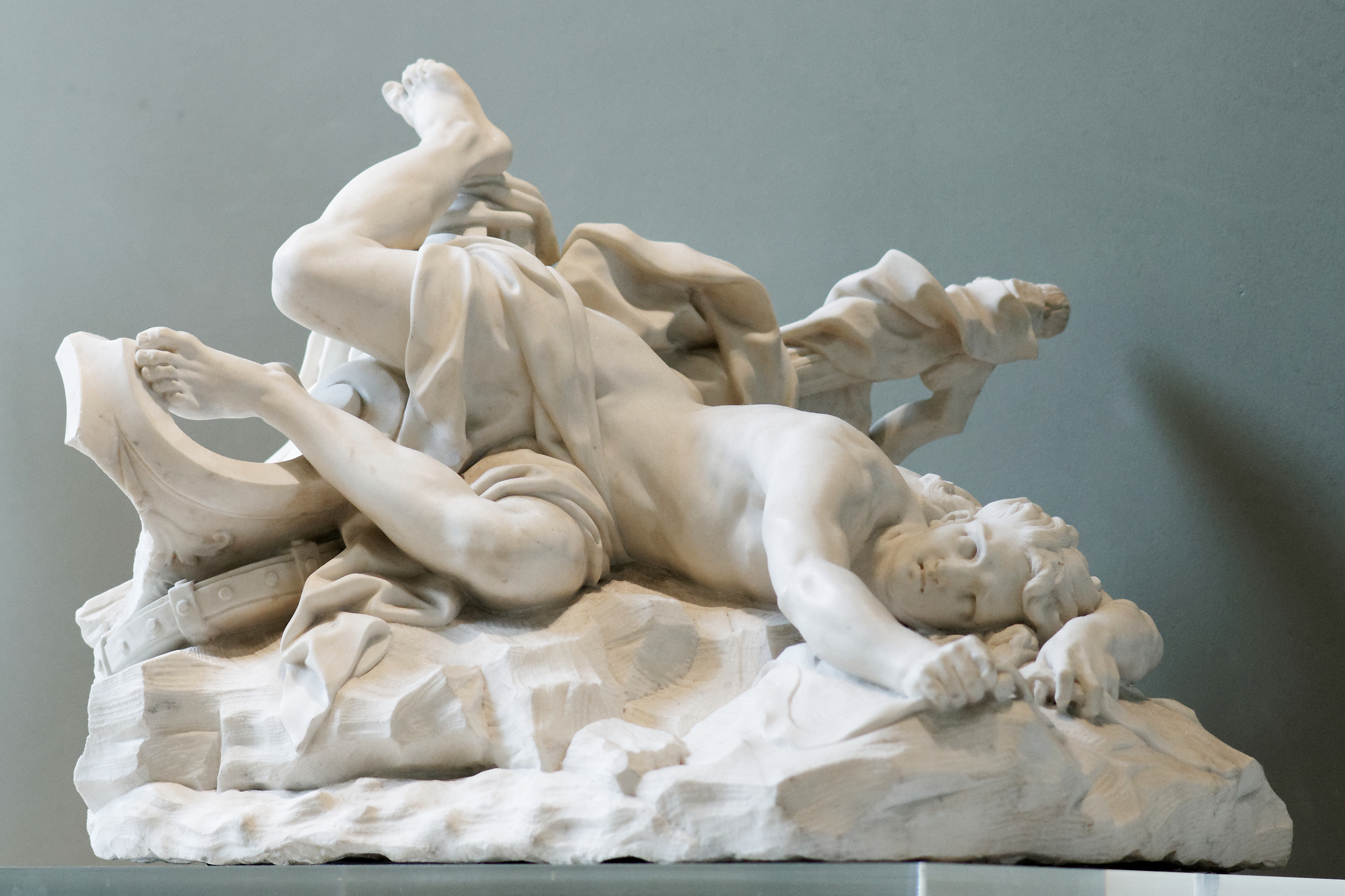
The Death of Hippolytus, by Jean-Baptiste Lemoyne (1679–1731), Louvre

Euripides' tragedy Hippolytus describes the death of the hero after a confrontation with his stepmother Phaedra, the second wife of Theseus. Cursed by Aphrodite, Phaedra falls so ardently in love with Hippolytus that she becomes physically ill and decides to end her suffering through suicide. Her nurse tries to save her by revealing the secret to Hippolytus and encouraging him to reciprocate. Hippolytus responds only with horror and disgust, humiliating Phaedra. In despair, and not wanting to admit the true reason for ending her life, she hangs herself and leaves a note for Theseus accusing his son, Hippolytus, of raping her. Theseus, furious, uses one of the three wishes given to him by Poseidon, his father: Theseus calls on Poseidon to kill Hippolytus, who has fled the palace to go hunting. Poseidon sends a sea-monster to terrorize Hippolytus' chariot horses, which become uncontrollable and hurl their master out of the vehicle. Entangled in the reins, Hippolytus is dragged and suffers lethal wounds. Artemis reconciles father and son by telling Theseus that Phaedra's accusation against Hippolytus was not true. Artemis comforts the dying Hippolytus with a promise to make him the subject of religious practice so that his memory will live forever. She assigns a band of Trozenian maidens the task of preserving the story of Phaedra and Hippolytus in a ritual song.

Versions of this story also appear in Seneca the Younger's play Phaedra, Ovid's Metamorphoses and Heroides, Jean Racine's Phèdre, and Thomas Sturge Moore's Aphrodite against Artemis.

== In Italy as Virbius ==
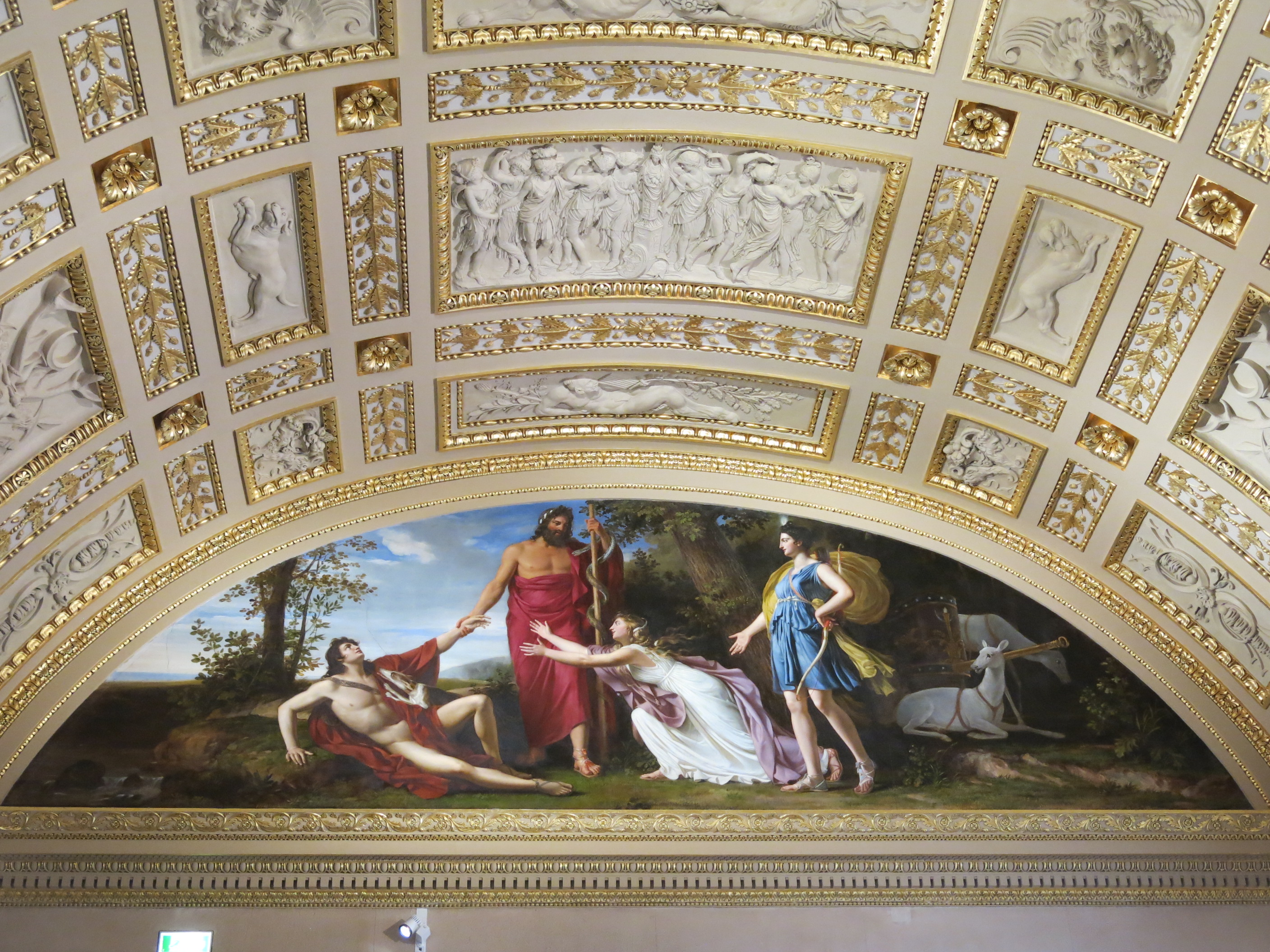
Diana returning to Aricia Hippolytus resuscitated by Aesculapius

During a later phase of Hellenization, Virbius, one of two figures associated with the ancient cult of Diana Nemorensis (the other being Egeria), was assimilated to the Hippolytus, as a metamorphosis.

The version presented by Ovid in his Metamorphoses, and by Pausanias, relates a story about Hippolytus that differs from the version presented by Euripides. Here Hippolytus was brought back from the dead by Asclepius, but once revived he refused to forgive Theseus, went to Italy, became the king of the Aricians, and named a city after Artemis. He there ruled as "Virbius" from inside the shrine of Diana. (The sanctuary forbade horses from entering, which is why it is believed he lived there.) Euripides' Hippolytus remained permanently connected him to his tomb. Virbius was also identified with the sun god Sol/Helios (Phaedra's grandfather).

The nature of Virbius' function remains enigmatic, but his cult maintained that Artemis asked Asclepius to resurrect the young man since he had vowed chastity to her. Followers of Hippolytus' cult cut off a piece of their hair to dedicate their chastity to him before marriage.

== Gallery ==
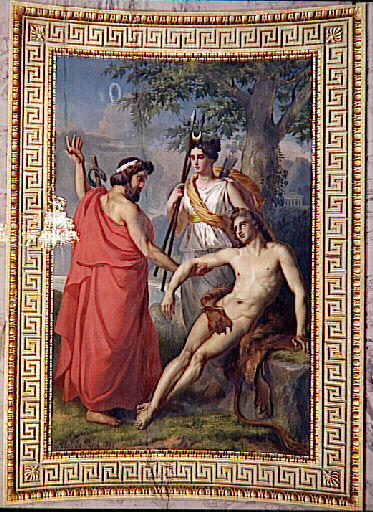
Esculape rend la vie à Hippolyte by Abel de Pujol

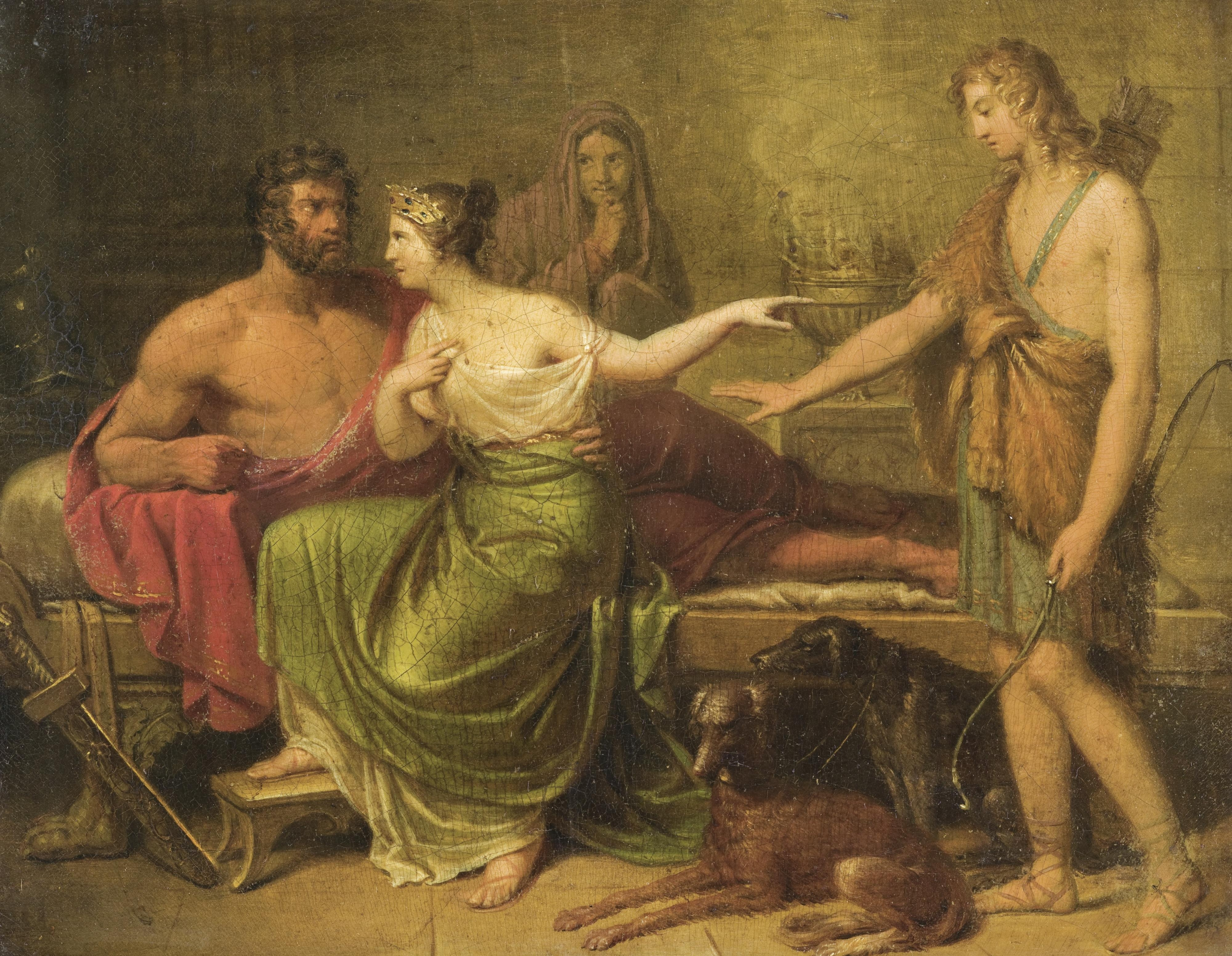
Hippolytus, Phaedra and Theseus. German School, 18th century

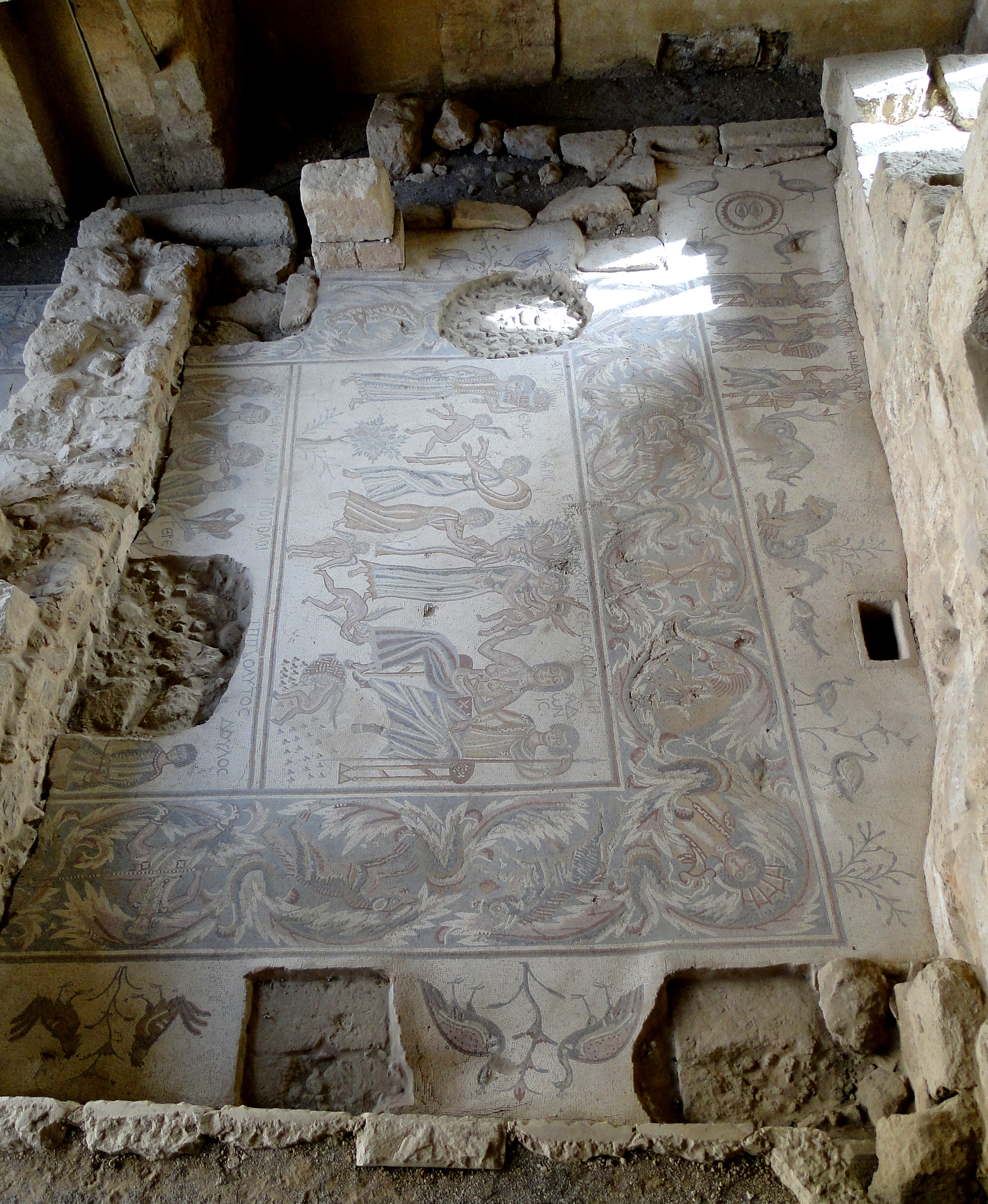
Part of the mosaic of Hippolytus in the Archaeological Park of Madaba, Jordan

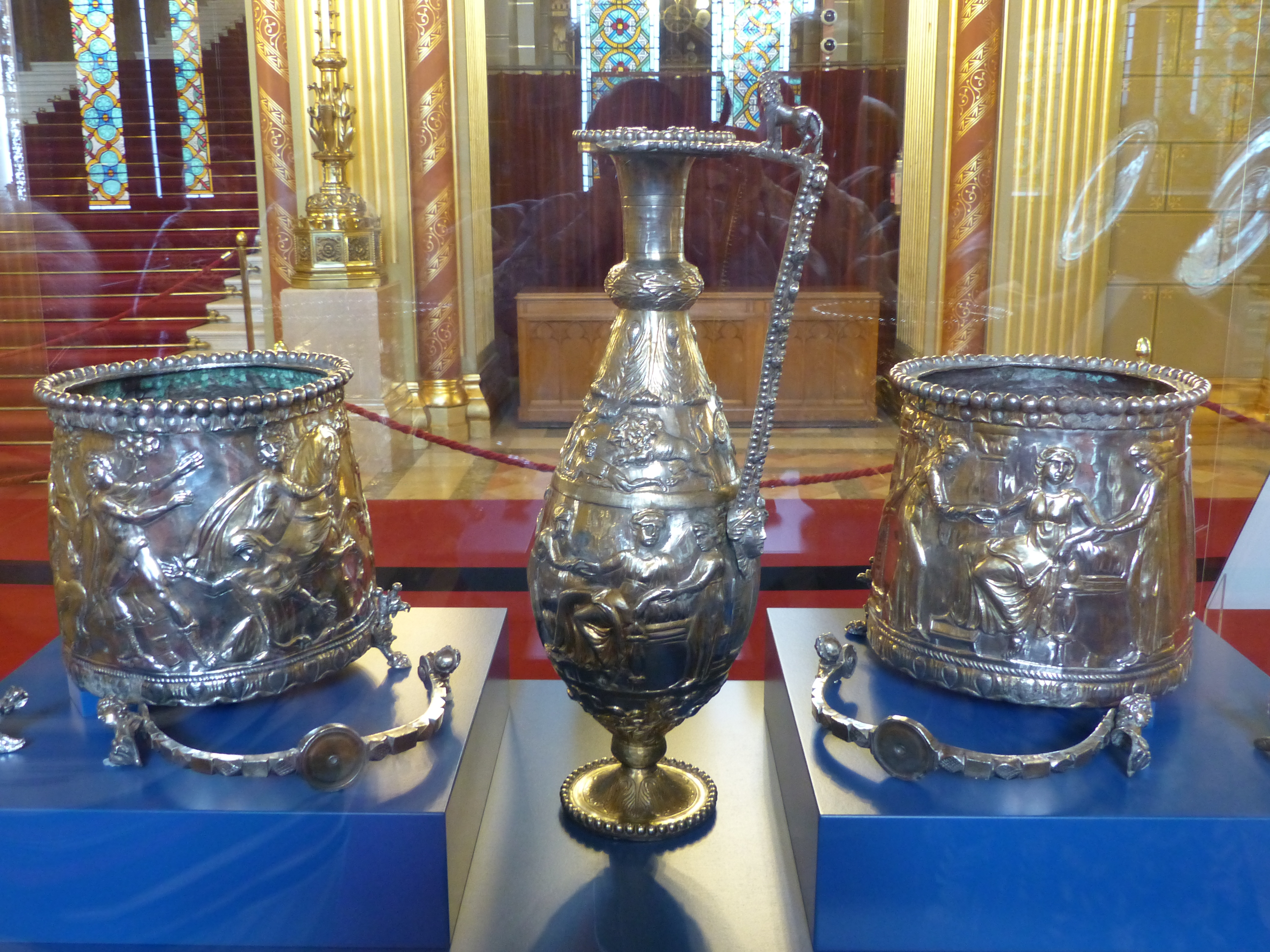
Hippolytus set – Seuso Treasure

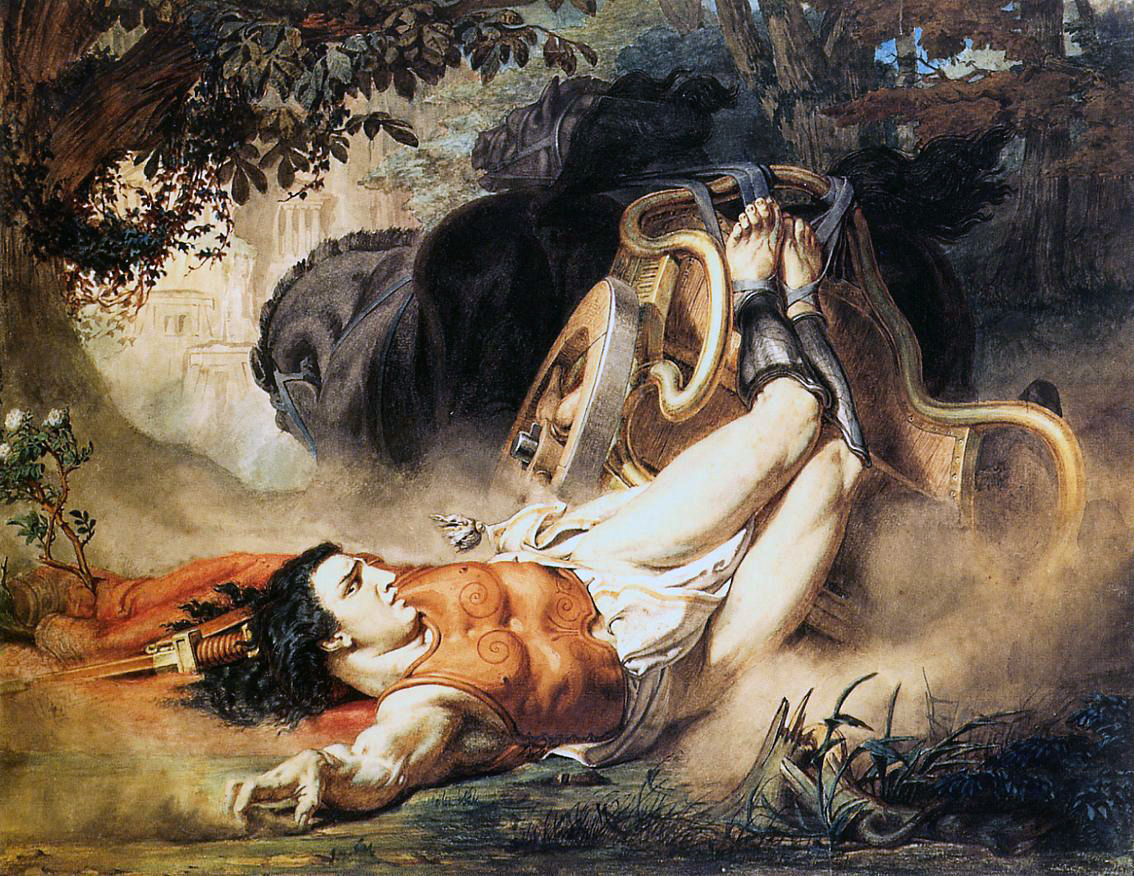
The Death of Hippolytus, by Sir Lawrence Alma-Tadema (1836–1912)

== See also ==
- Rex Nemorensis
- The Golden Bough
- Phaedra complex
- Ippolito ed Aricia
- Hippolyte et Aricie
