= Aricia (mythology) =

Name appearing in Virgil's Aeneid

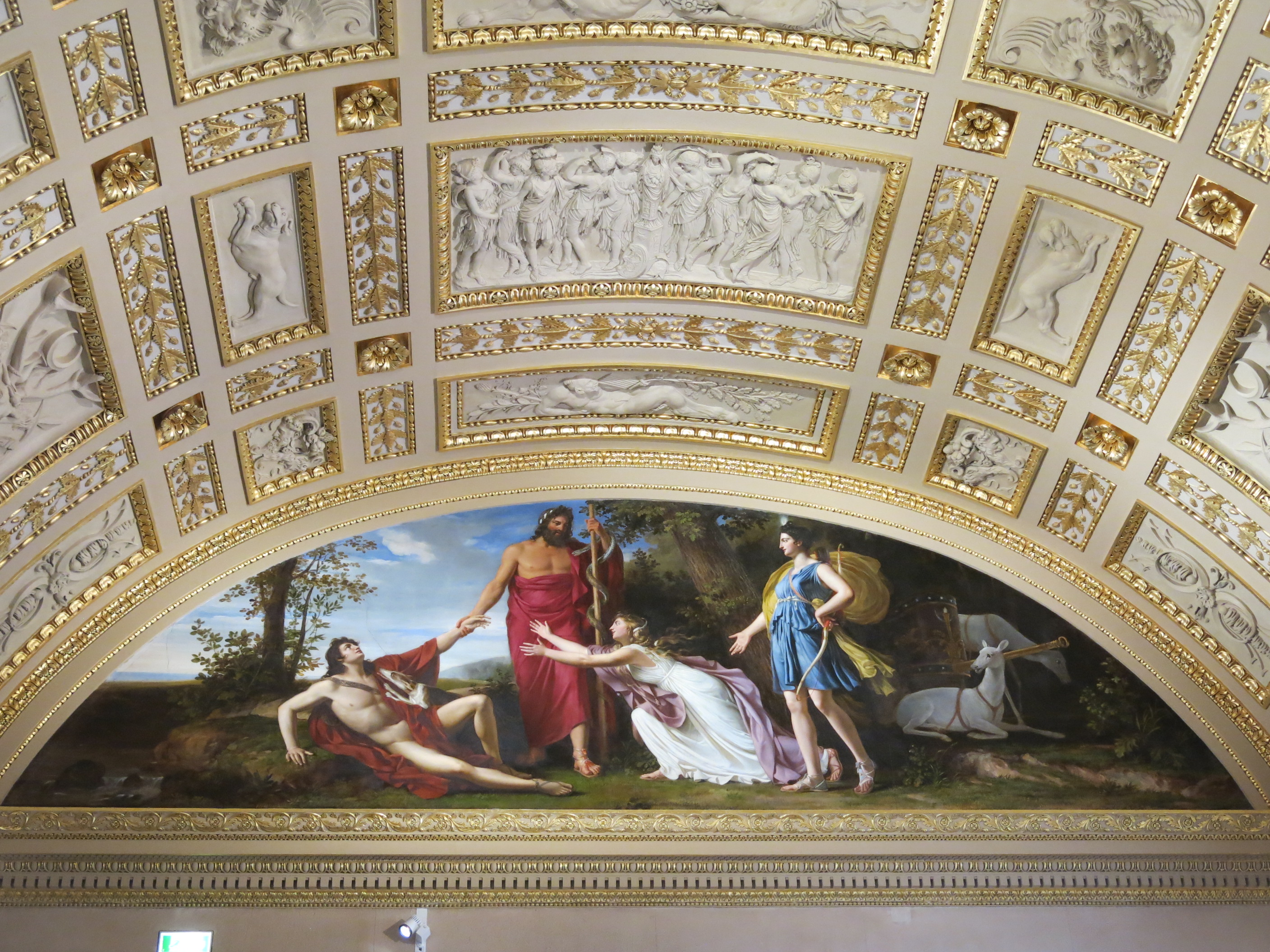
Diana returning to Aricia Hippolytus resuscitated by Aesculapius.

Aricia (Ancient Greek: Ἀρικία, Arikía) is a name appearing in Virgil's Aeneid in a context that makes it possible for it to be interpreted as referring to a mythical personage:

Ibat et Hippolyti proles pulcherrima bello,
Virbius, insignem quem mater Aricia misit...

(Rough translation: "To the war also came the most fair offspring of Hippolytus, Virbius, whom, distinguished, mother Aricia sent...")

It may appear from the quoted passage that Aricia is the mother of Virbius by Hippolytus. Yet Virbius is commonly the name by which Hippolytus himself was known after he was brought back to life on the request of Artemis. As for Aricia, Servius, in his commentary on the lines in question, explained that Virgil had been referring to the town Aricia, using the epithet "mother" with the town's name in honor of Octavian Augustus, whose mother was a native of Aricia. Indeed, Aricia was a location holy to Diana (equated with Artemis) near Rome where Egeria, the spirit of a nearby stream, shared with Diana the guardianship of childbirth, and where Hippolytus (Virbius) was said to have been brought by Artemis after his resurrection.

Nevertheless, the passage in the Aeneid seems to have given rise to a literary tradition concerning Aricia as a consort of Hippolytus. Giovanni Boccaccio in his Genealogia Deorum Gentilium states that Theodontius was wrong in making Hippolytus celibate and explains that the character was known to have had a love affair with an Athenian noblewoman named "Aritia". Aricia (French Aricie) is also a major character in Jean Racine's Phèdre, where she is made out to be the sole surviving member of the house of Pallas.

== Sources ==
- Realencyclopädie der Classischen Altertumswissenschaft, Band IXA, Halbband 17, Vindelici-Vulca (1961) - s. 179
- Wilhelm Heinrich Roscher (ed.): Ausführliches Lexikon der griechischen und römischen Mythologie. Band 1.1 (A-H), Leipzig, 1886. - s. 546
