= Phèdre =

1677 tragedy by Racine

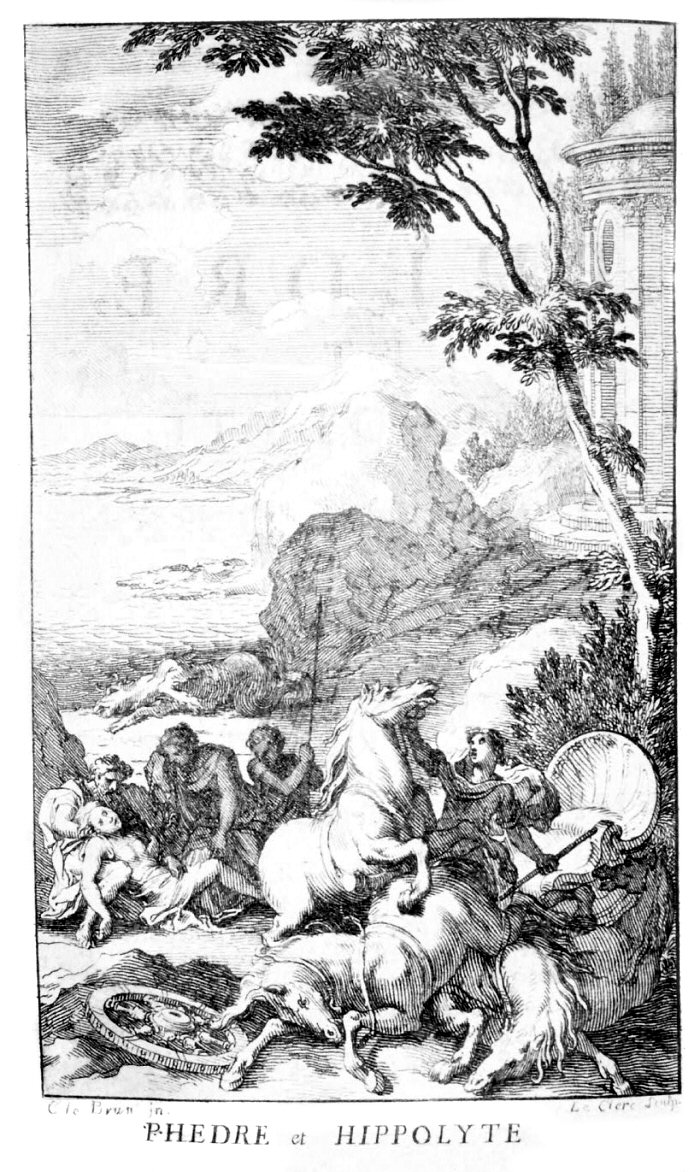
- Title page from the first edition of Phèdre et Hippolyte
- Written by: Jean Racine
- Characters: Phèdre; Œnone; Hippolyte; Théramène; Thésée; Aricie
- Setting: The royal palace at Trézène

Phèdre (French: [fɛdʁ]; originally Phèdre et Hippolyte) is a French tragedy in five acts written in alexandrine verse by Jean Racine, first performed in 1677 at the theatre of the Hôtel de Bourgogne in Paris.

== Composition and premiere ==
With Phèdre, Racine chose once more a subject from Greek mythology, already treated by Greek and Roman tragic poets, notably by Euripides in Hippolytus and Seneca in Phaedra.

As a result of an intrigue by the Duchess of Bouillon and other friends of the aging Pierre Corneille, the play was not a success at its première on 1 January 1677 at the Hôtel de Bourgogne, home of the royal troupe of actors in Paris. Indeed, a rival group staged a play by the now forgotten playwright Nicolas Pradon on an almost identical theme. After Phèdre, Racine ceased writing plays on secular themes and devoted himself to the service of religion and the king until 1689, when he was commissioned to write Esther by Madame de Maintenon, the morganatic second wife of Louis XIV.

== Characters ==
Names of characters in French, with their equivalents in English:

- Thésée, or Theseus, King of Athens
- Phèdre, or Phaedra, wife of Thésée, daughter of Minos and Pasiphaë and sister of Ariadne
- Hippolyte, or Hippolytus, son of Thésée and Antiope, Queen of the Amazons
- Aricie, or Aricia, princess of the royal blood of Athens
- Œnone, or Oenone, nurse and confidante of Phèdre
- Théramène, or Theramenes, tutor of Hippolyte
- Ismène, confidante of Aricie
- Panope, lady-in-waiting to Phèdre

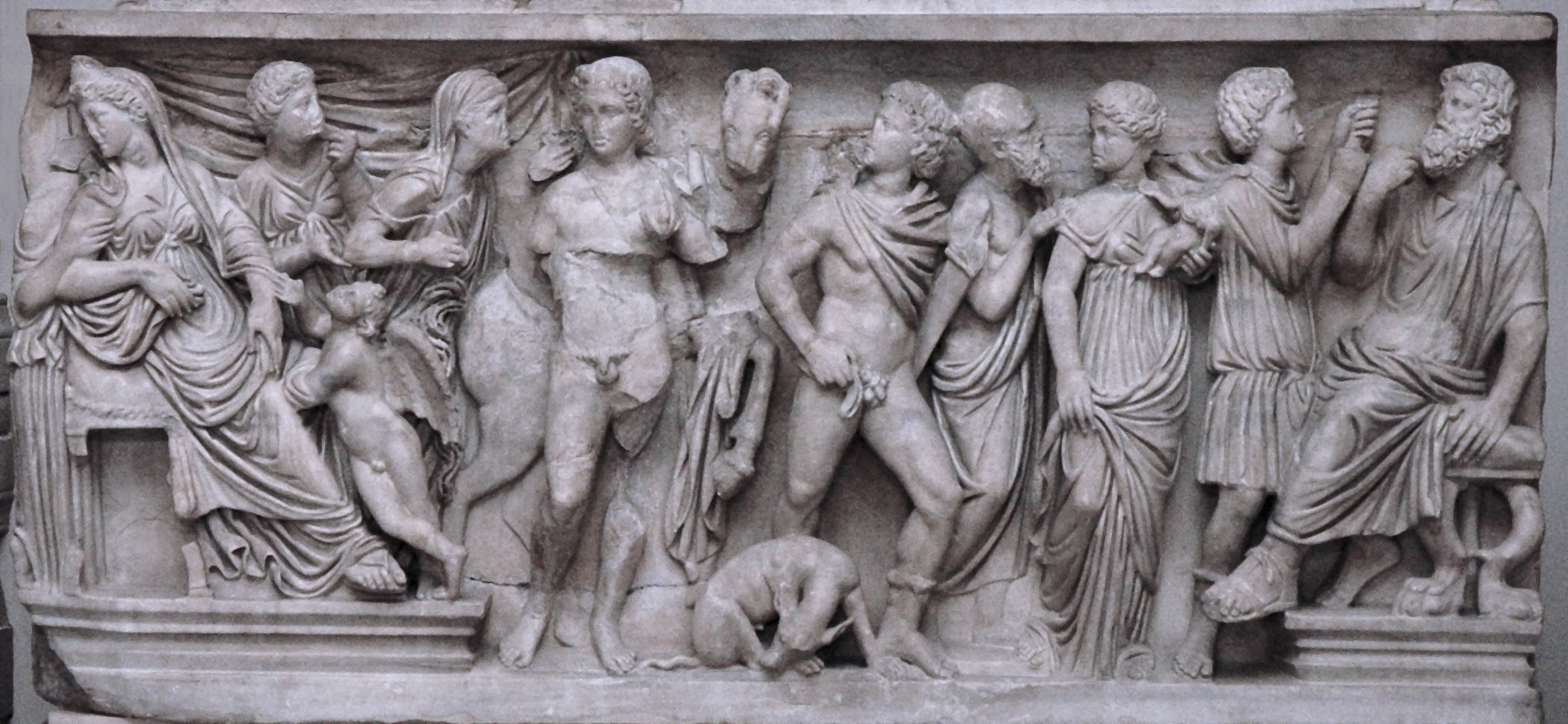
Phaedra and Hippolytus, c. 290 AD

== Synopsis ==
The play is set at the royal court in Troezen, on the Peloponnesus coast in Southern Greece. In the absence of her royal husband Thésée, Phèdre ends by declaring her love to Hippolyte, Thésée's son from a previous marriage.

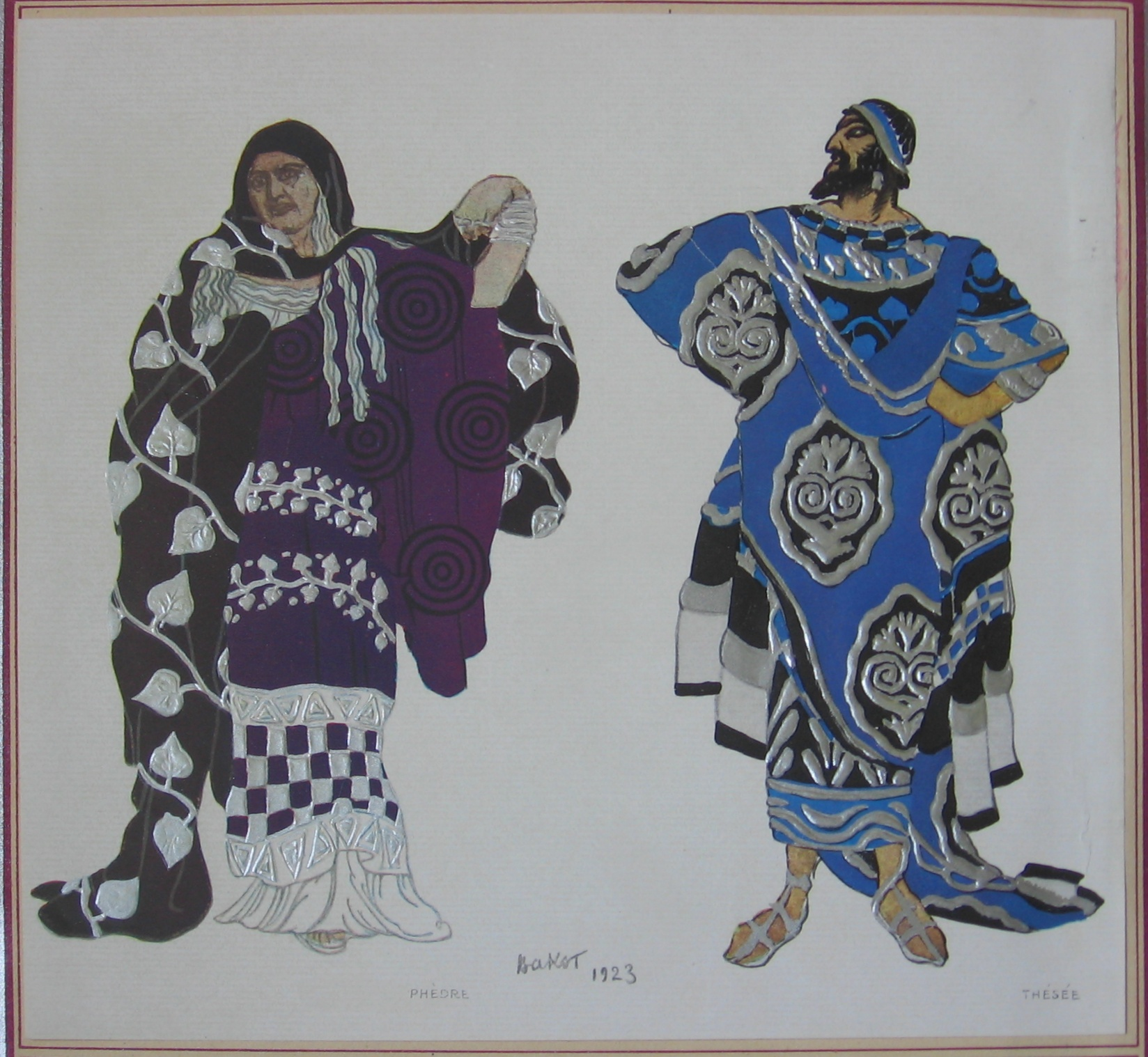
Phèdre and Thésée (1923), Léon Bakst

Act 1. Following Theseus's six-month absence, his son Hippolytus tells his tutor Theramenes of his intention to leave Troezen in search of his father. When pressed by Theramenes, he reveals that the real motive is his forbidden love for Aricia, sole survivor of the royal house supplanted by Theseus and under a vow of chastity against her will. During her husband's absence, Phèdre has become consumed by an illicit but overpowering passion for her stepson Hippolytus, which she has kept as a dark secret. Close to death and reeling about half-dementedly, under pressure from her old nurse Oenone she explains her state, on condition that she be permitted to die rather than face dishonour. The death of Theseus is announced with the news that his succession is in dispute. Oenone urges her mistress that, since her love for her stepson is now legitimate, she should form an alliance with him, if only for the future benefit of the infant son of her own flesh.

Act 2. With fresh hope for her liberty, Aricia reveals to her maidservant Ismène her feelings towards Hippolytus, who promptly appears to declare his love for her. Their discourse is interrupted by Phèdre, who distraughtly pleads for the rights of her infant son, explaining her coldness and personal despair. Suddenly entering a trance-like state overcome by emotion, she involuntarily confesses her hidden passions to her horrified dumb-struck stepson. Sensing rejection, she leaves in a wild frenzy, demanding Hippolytus' sword to end her torment. Theramenes brings news to Hippolytus that Theseus might still be alive.

Act 3. In desperation Phèdre sends word to Hippolytus inviting him to share the crown of Athens. However, Oenone brings her the devastating news that Theseus has returned in perfect health. To avert Phèdre's deathwish and her possible betrayal by Hippolytus, Oenone urges that a story should be concocted around his abandoned sword. Seeing Hippolytus by Theseus' side, Phèdre grants Oenone free rein. After his long period in captivity, Theseus is surprised by the cold reception from his wife and son, each anxious to conceal their passions: Phèdre, consumed by guilt; and Hippolytus, anxious to distance himself from his stepmother's advances, but unable to tell his father of his love for Aricia.

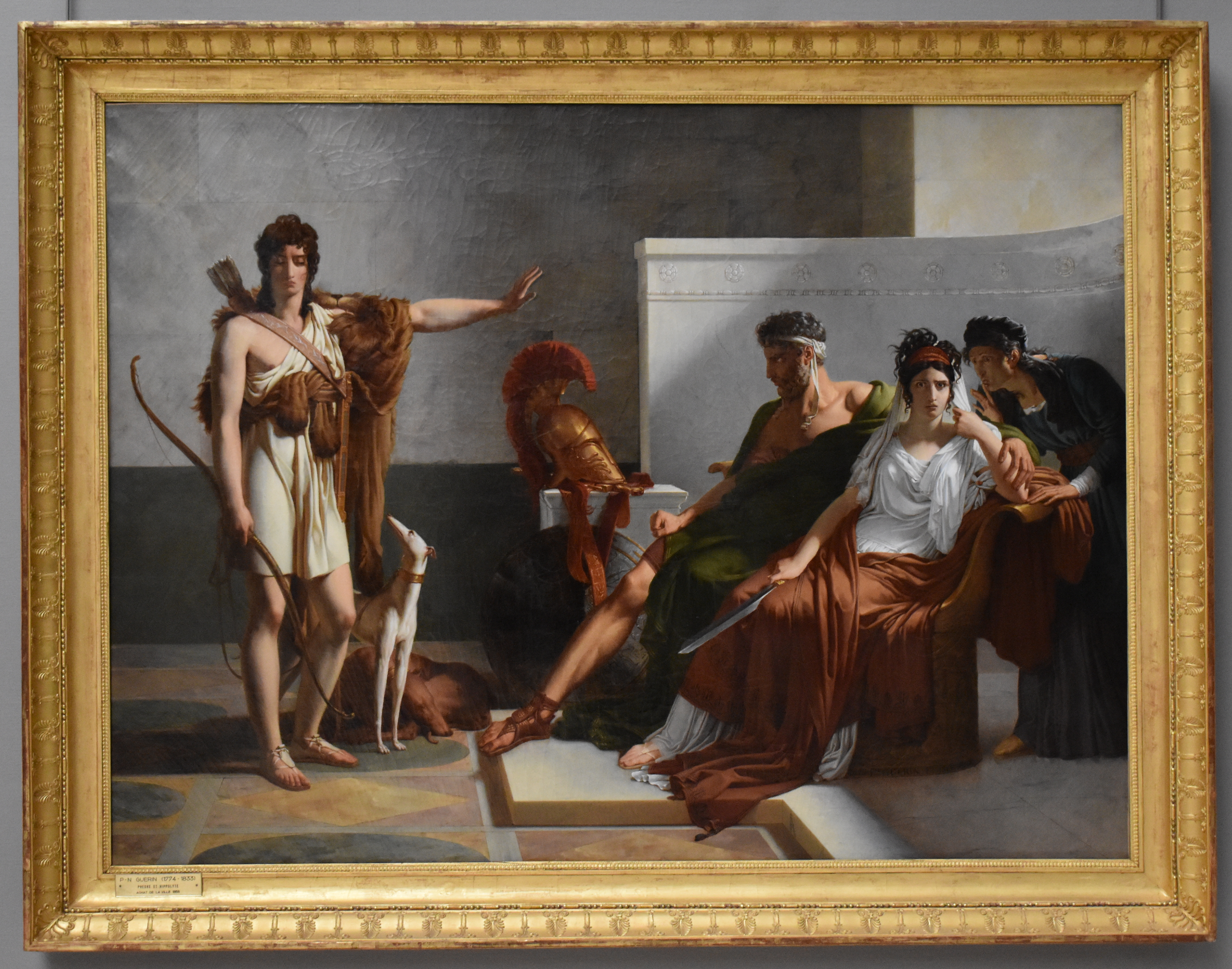
“Phèdre et Hippolyte,” par Pierre-Narcisse Guérin, Louvre Photo des Musées Nationaux, Paris

Act 4. Theseus has just been told by Oenone that Hippolytus has attempted to take Phèdre by force. Overcome by rage, Theseus banishes Hippolytus and invokes the god Neptune, who has promised to grant any wish of Theseus, to avenge him by his son's death. Protesting his innocence, Hippolytus discloses his secret love for Aricia to his incredulous father and leaves in despair. Fearing that she might be guilty for Hippolytus' death, Phèdre determines to reveal the truth to her husband, until she is told of Hippolytus' love for Aricia. Consumed by jealousy, she refuses to defend Hippolytus further, leaving his father's curse to run its course. When Oenone tries to make light of her mistress's illicit love, Phèdre in a towering rage accuses her of being a poisonous scheming monster and banishes her from her presence.

Act 5. Hippolytus takes his leave of Aricia, promising to marry her in a temple outside Troezen. On witnessing the tenderness of their parting, Theseus begins to have doubts about his son's guilt. He decides to question Oenone, but it is too late: Oenone has thrown herself to the waves. Theramenes brings news of his son's death: Hippolytus' departing chariot has been interrupted by a terrifying horned monster rising from the waves; mortally wounded by Hippolytus, its death throes drive his horses into a wild frenzy; in their flight, the chariot is dashed against the rocks and their master dragged helplessly to his death. In the closing scene, Phèdre, now calm, appears before Theseus to confess her guilt and to confirm Hippolytus's innocence. She finally succumbs to the effects of a self-administered draught of Medean poison, taken to rid the world of her impurity. As an act of atonement and in respect for his son's parting promise, Theseus pardons Aricia and adopts her as his daughter.

== Myth ==
The genealogy of Phèdre gives a number of indications as to her character's destiny. Descended from Helios, god of the Sun, and Pasiphaë, she nevertheless avoids being in the judgmental presence of the sun throughout the play. The simultaneous absence of a god-figure combined with the continual presence of one has been extensively explored in Lucien Goldmann's Le Dieu caché. This sense of patriarchal judgment is extended to Phèdre's father, Minos, who is responsible for weighing the souls of the dead upon their arrival in Hades.

Phèdre is right to fear judgment; she is driven to an incestual love for her stepson Hippolytus, much like the other women in her family, who tended to experience desires generally considered taboo. Her mother, Pasiphaë was cursed by Aphrodite to fall in love and mate with a white bull, giving rise to the legendary Minotaur. Phèdre meets Theseus, her future husband, when he arrives on the Minoan scene to kill the monstrous Minotaur; by doing so, he is killing her half-brother.

== Reception ==
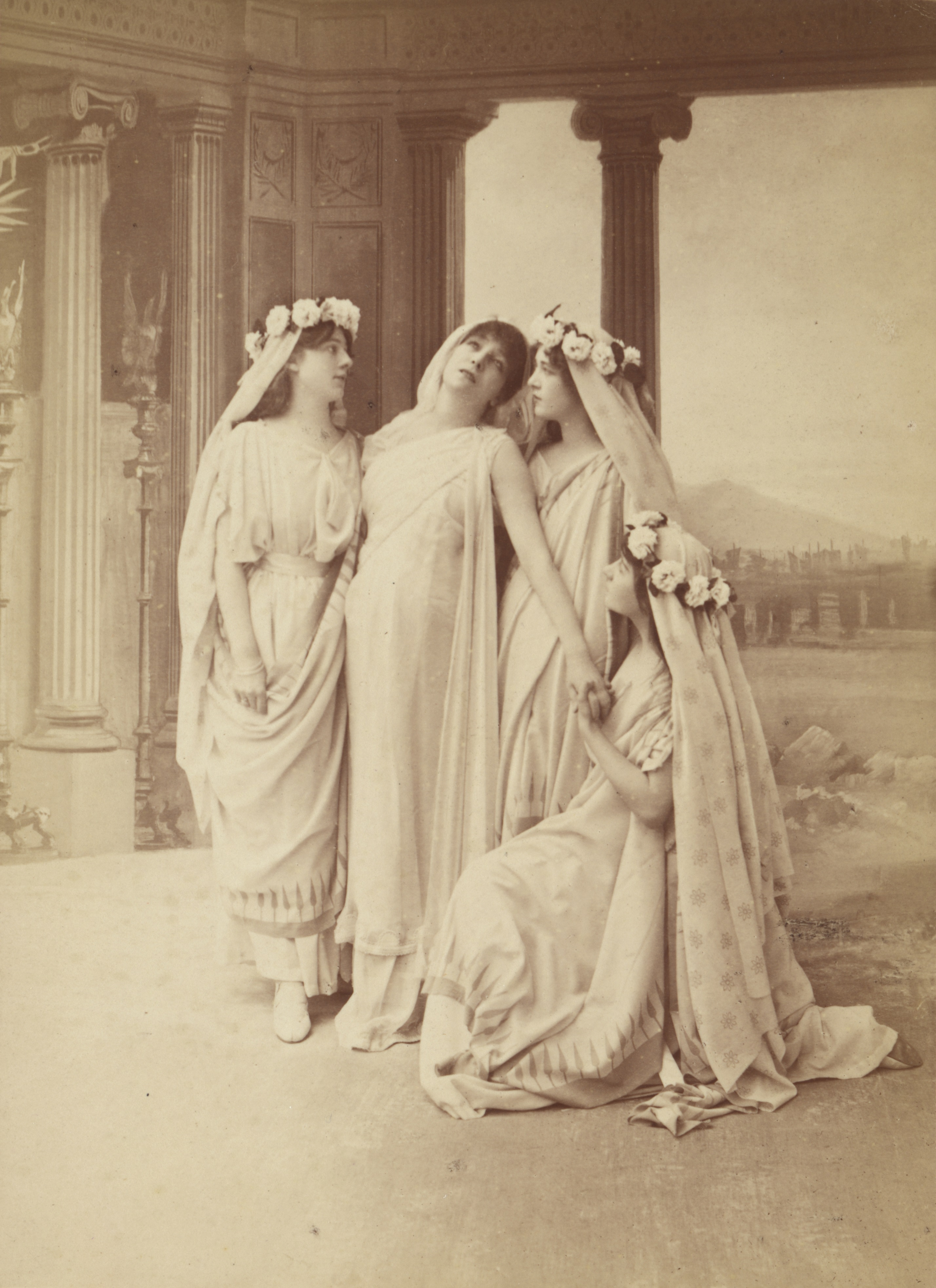
Sarah Bernhardt as Phedre in 1870.

Phèdre has been widely regarded as masterly, due to its tragic construction, deeply observed characters, richness of the verse, as well as the interpretation of the title role by Marie Champmeslé. Voltaire called it "the masterpiece of the human mind." Contrary to Euripides, Racine has Phèdre die on stage at the end of the play; she thus has had time to learn of the death of Hippolyte. The character of Phèdre is considered one of the most remarkable in Racine's tragic oeuvre. The instrument of others' suffering, she is also the victim of her own impulses, a figure that inspires both terror and pity.

Certain lines from the play, such as "la fille de Minos et de Pasiphaé" ("the daughter of Minos and Pasiphaë"), have become classics in the French language; but despite the celebrated musicality of the alexandrine, Racine never wrote poetry just for the sake of beauty of sound. In the character of Phèdre, he could combine the consuming desire inherited from her mother with the mortal fear of her father, Minos, judge of the dead in Hades. Despite its author's silence from 1677 to 1689, as time progressed Phèdre became one of the most famous of his plays. It is now one of the most frequently staged tragedies from the seventeenth century.

In his work Le Dieu caché, the 20th century author Lucien Goldmann extrapolates social theories of the role of the divine in French consciousness from thematic elements in Phèdre. Although Phèdre is perhaps less often studied at high school level in France than Britannicus or Andromaque, it is still frequently performed, and the eponymous role has been played by actresses such as Sarah Bernhardt and Isabelle Huppert.

== Adaptations ==
=== Stage ===
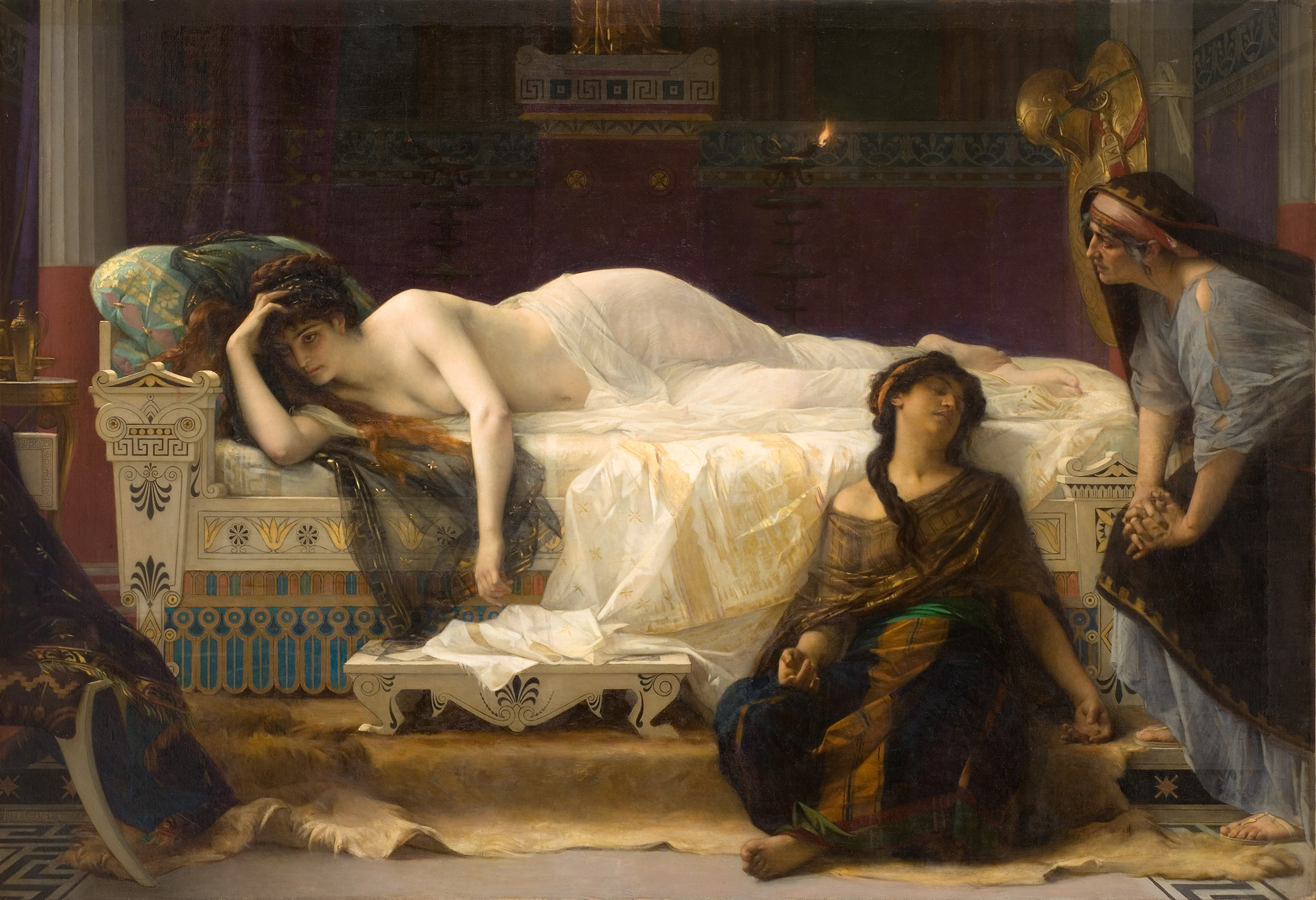
Phèdre (1880), Alexandre Cabanel

The French baroque composer Jean-Philippe Rameau's first opera Hippolyte et Aricie (1733) was based on Racine's Phèdre, as was Simon Mayr's 1820 opera Fedra.

The poet Tony Harrison wrote an adaptation of Racine's play titled Phaedra Britannica that transposed Phèdre's setting to mid-19th century colonial India. Harrison's adaptation premiered at The Old Vic in 1975.

The British poet laureate Ted Hughes produced a highly regarded free verse translation of Phèdre. This version was staged shortly before his death with Diana Rigg playing the title role. Another English production of the Hughes translation premiered at the Royal National Theatre in June 2009, with a cast including Helen Mirren as Phèdre, Dominic Cooper as Hippolytus, and Margaret Tyzack as Oenone. This production was digitally telecast live to cinemas around the world.

A new translation by Timberlake Wertenbaker premiered at the Stratford Shakespeare Festival in Autumn 2009.

The Polish composer Krzysztof Penderecki announced that he was working on an opera of Phèdre for 2014. However, it was announced in 2018 that he was unable to complete it, and preferred to be released from his contract. He died in 2020.

=== Novels ===
In the nineteenth century, Émile Zola loosely based La Curée, one of his books from the Rougon-Macquart series (an exploration of genealogical and environmental influences upon characters), on Racine's Phèdre. Marcel Proust devotes 20 pages of In the Shadow of Young Girls in Flower to his experience of the Sarah Bernhardt Phèdre at the Opéra-Comique in Paris.

=== Translations ===
Robert Lowell's English translation Phaedra was published in 1961.

Robert David MacDonald's English translation, titled Phedra, was produced at The Old Vic in November 1984, designed and directed by Philip Prowse and with Glenda Jackson in the title role and Robert Eddison as Theramenes.

Phèdre was translated by Scottish poet Edwin Morgan (1920–2010) into Scots in 2000, and won the 2001 Oxford-Weidenfeld Translation Prize.

=== Musical settings ===
François Mensonguée (1806-1877), the French Romantic composer, set a section of the second act to music for choir and organ in 1829 as his first published work.

=== Selected editions ===
- Racine, Jean (1995), Phèdre, Folio Editions, Éditions Gallimard, ISBN 978-2-07-038763-2
- Racine, Jean (1970), Iphigenia/Phaedra/Athaliah, Penguin Books, ISBN 0-14-044122-0 (English translation by J. Cairncross)
- Racine, Jean (2001), Phèdre, Dover Books, ISBN 0-486-41927-4 (English translation by Wallace Fowlie)
- Racine, Jean (2001), Britannicus, Phaedra, Athaliah, Oxford University Press, ISBN 0-19-283827-X (English translation by Charles Sisson)
- Racine, Jean (2001), Phèdre, Nick Hern Books, ISBN 978-1-85459-094-7 (English translation by Julie Rose)
- Racine, Jean (1987), Phaedra : tragedy in five acts, 1677, Harcourt Brace Jovanovich, ISBN 015675780X (translated into English verse by Richard Wilbur)
- Racine, Jean (2010), Racine's Phèdre, CreateSpace Independent Publishing Platform, ISBN 978-1453629352 (translated into English verse by Harold Anthony Lloyd)
