= Colonna (surname) =

Colonna is a surname of Italian origin. It is derived from the Italian word for 'column,' originating from the Roman Empire. It is mostly found in the region Puglia.

Notable people with the surname include:

- Catherine Colonna (b. 1956), a French politician
- Colonna family, some of whom included in following list:
- Dominique Colonna (1928–2023), a French football goalkeeper
- Edward Colonna, jewelry and railroad car designer, graphic artist, interior decorator, and architect
- Fanny Colonna (1934–2014), Algerian sociologist and anthropologist
- Giacomo "Sciarra" Colonna (1270–1329), member of the powerful Colonna family
- Fabrizio Colonna (c. 1450 – 1520)
- Francesco Colonna (1433(?) – 1527), an Italian Dominican friar, author of Hypnerotomachia Poliphili
- Giovanni Colonna (archaeologist) (b. 1934), an Italian scholar of ancient Italy and, in particular, the Etruscan civilization.
- Giovanni Paolo Colonna (c.1637–1695), an Italian musician and composer
- Guido Colonna di Paliano (1908–1982), an Italian politician and European Commissioner
- Jean-Hugues Colonna (1934–2026), a French politician
- Jerry Colonna (disambiguation), multiple people

- Jerry Colonna (entertainer), American comedy writer and performer
- Jerry Colonna (financier), New York City venture capitalist

- Marcantonio Colonna (disambiguation)
  - Marcantonio Colonna (1535–1584), Duke of Tagliacozzo and Duke and Prince of Paliano, was an Italian aristocrat who served as a Viceroy of Sicily in the service of the Spanish Crown, Spanish general, and Captain General of the Church
  - Marcantonio I Colonna (1478–1522), condottiero, lord of Frascati
  - Marcantonio V Colonna (1606/10–1659), Prince of Paliano
  - Marco Antonio Colonna (1523–1597), cardinal
  - Marcantonio Colonna (18th-century cardinal) (1724–1793)
  - Marcantonio Colonna (born 1949), pen name of British historian and author Henry Sire
- Niccolò Turrisi Colonna (1817–1889), a Sicilian politician from Palermo
- Sarah Colonna, American stand-up comedian, and roundtable regular on Chelsea Lately
- Vittoria Colonna, 1490–1547, marchioness of Pescara, Italian noblewoman, poet, friend of Michelangelo
- Yvan Colonna (b. 1960) a Corsican nationalist

== See also ==
- Gabrielle Colonna-Romano (1888–1981), French actress
- Colonnese
