= Vargunteia gens =

Ancient Roman family

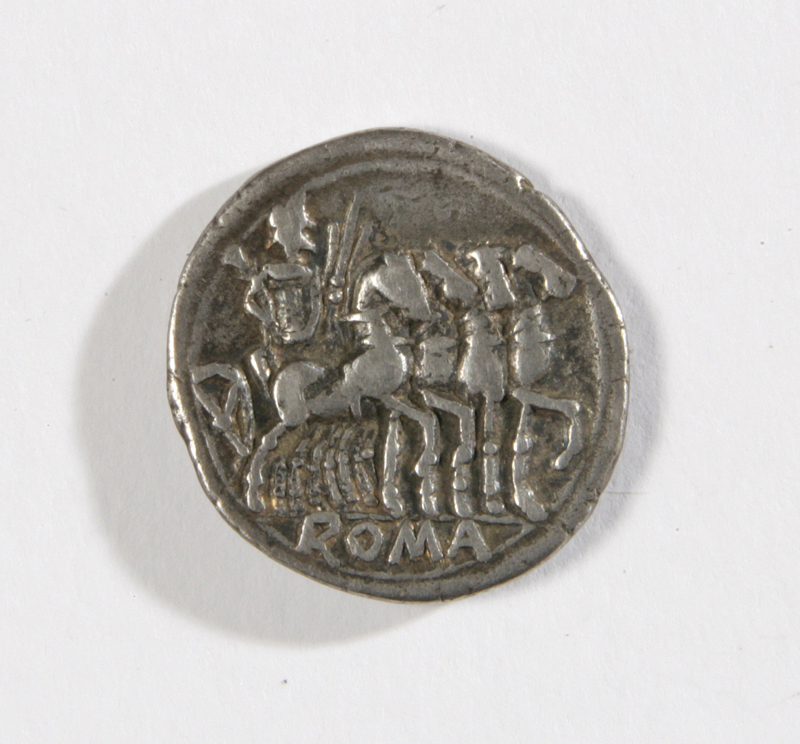
Silver denarius of Marcus Vargunteius, depicting Jupiter driving a quadriga.

The gens Vargunteia was a minor plebeian family of ancient Rome. Only a few members of this gens are mentioned by Roman writers, of whom the best known include one of the Catilinian conspirators, and a noteworthy grammarian mentioned by Suetonius. Others are known from inscriptions, including a Lucius Vargunteius who attained the praetorship during the second century BC.

== Origin ==
The nomen Vargunteius belongs to a large class of gentilicia formed using the suffix -eius, which was typical of, although not exclusive to names of Oscan origin.

== Praenomina ==
The main praenomina of the Vargunteii were Marcus and Lucius, both of which were among the most common names at all periods of Roman history. A few Vargunteii bore other common names, including Gnaeus and Quintus.

== Members ==
This list includes abbreviated praenomina. For an explanation of this practice, see filiation.

- Lucius Vargunteius L. f. Rufus, praetor in an uncertain year belonging to the middle portion of the second century BC, according to inscriptions from Rome and Setia.
- Marcus Vargunteius, triumvir monetalis at some time between 130 and 110 BC.
- Lucius Vargunteius, a Roman senator, was accused of bribery, and defended by Quintus Hortensius. In 63 BC, he joined the conspiracy of Catiline, in the course of which Vargunteius and Gaius Cornelius Cethegus intended to assassinate the consul Cicero. When the plot was revealed, Vargunteius was placed on trial, and no advocate was willing to defend him.
- Lucius Vargunteius, the master of a slave named Menander, named along with other slaves serving a religious order at Minturnae in Latium, in an inscription dating from the first half of the first century BC.
- Vargunteius, a Legate of Marcus Licinius Crassus during his disastrous campaign against the Parthians in 53 BC. Near Carrhae, Vargunteius led four cohorts away from the main Roman force, but they lost their way in the dark of night, and were surrounded on a low hill, where the legate and all but twenty of his men were slain.
- Varguntea, named in a sepulchral inscription from Rome, dating between 30 and 20 BC.
- Lucius Vargunteius Martialis, named along with the freedwomen Patulcia Sabbatis and Patulcia Auge in a sepulchral inscription from Rome, dating between the last quarter of the first century BC, and the first quarter of the first century AD.
- Quintus Vargunteius, a grammarian, and an authority on Ennius.
- Vargunteia Optata, buried at Tarentum in Calabria, in a tomb built by her husband, Lucius Helvius Dionysius, dating from the first half of the first century.
- Marcus Vargunteius Secundus, one of several persons, some of them freedwomen, named in a sepulchral inscription from Ferentinum in Latium, dating from the first half of the first century.
- Vargunteia Nais, together with Lucius Curius Eutrapelus, made offerings to Latona at Aricia, and to Diana Nemorensis at Nemus Dianae, both in Latium, during the first or second century.
- Vargunteia M. f. Procilla, together with her husband, Numerius Clodius Nymphicus, and son, Numerius Clodius Numerianus, built a family sepulchre at Frusino in Latium for themselves and Numerius Clodius Proculinus, late son of Procilla and Nymphicus, dating between the late first century and the end of the second.
- Marcus Vargunteius Victor, an agent of the officials in charge of the distribution of grain at Portus in Latium, on behalf of the praefectus annonae Messius Extricatus, named in an inscription dated the fifteenth day before the Kalends of October, (Note: September 17.) AD 210.

=== Undated Vargunteii ===
- Vargunteia, built a tomb at Rome for Marcus Vargunteius.
- Gnaeus Vargunteius, a potter, whose maker's mark has been found on ceramics from Ferentinum.
- Marcus Vargunteius, buried at Rome, in a tomb built by Vargunteia.
- Marcus Vargunteius, a potter, whose maker's mark appears on ceramics from Rome.
- Vargu[nteius?] Nestor, named along with Antistia Sabina in a sepulchral inscription from Trebula Mutuesca in Sabinum.

== See also ==
- List of Roman gentes

== Bibliography ==
- Marcus Tullius Cicero, Pro Sulla.
- Gaius Sallustius Crispus (Sallust), Bellum Catilinae (The Conspiracy of Catiline).
- Gaius Suetonius Tranquillus, De Illustribus Grammaticis (On the Illustrious Grammarians).
- Archivio Storico Pugliese, Società di storia patria per la Puglia (1948–present).
- T. Robert S. Broughton, The Magistrates of the Roman Republic, American Philological Association (1952–1986).
- René Cagnat et alii, L'Année épigraphique (The Year in Epigraphy, abbreviated AE), Presses Universitaires de France (1888–present).
- George Davis Chase, "The Origin of Roman Praenomina", in Harvard Studies in Classical Philology, vol. VIII, pp. 103–184 (1897).
- Michael Crawford, Roman Republican Coinage, Cambridge University Press (1974, 2001).
- Dictionary of Greek and Roman Biography and Mythology, William Smith, ed., Little, Brown and Company, Boston (1849).
- Joseph Hilarius Eckhel, Doctrina Numorum Veterum (The Study of Ancient Coins, 1792–1798).
- Theodor Mommsen et alii, Corpus Inscriptionum Latinarum (The Body of Latin Inscriptions, abbreviated CIL), Berlin-Brandenburgische Akademie der Wissenschaften (1853–present).
