= The Takeover (novel) =

Novel by Murriel Spark

- First UK edition
- Author: Muriel Spark
- Cover artist: Peter Goodfellow
- Language: English
- Publisher: Macmillan
- Publication date: 1976
- Publication place: United Kingdom
- Media type: Print (Hardback & Paperback)
- Pages: 190
- ISBN: 0-14-004596-1
- OCLC: 4570177
- Dewey Decimal: 823/.9/14
- LC Class: PZ4.S735 Tak 1978 PR6037.P29

The Takeover is a novel by the Scottish author Muriel Spark. It was first published in 1976.

It is set in Nemi, Italy between 1973 and 1975. The author had moved to Italy as a permanent resident in the late 1960s.

== Plot summary ==
Three large villas overlooking Lake Nemi are owned by the wealthy, glamorous American Maggie Radcliffe who has recently remarried to Italian Marchese Berto. One villa is occupied by her son Michael and daughter-in-law Mary where manservant Lauro works. A second is leased by an Italian doctor, Emilio Bernardino, and his two children Letizia and Pietro, taught by English tutor Nancy Cowan (who is also Bernardino's lover). The third is occupied by the eccentric Hubert Mallindaine with his secretary Pauline Thin. Hubert believes himself to be the descendant of the offspring of the Emperor Caligula's mythical liaison with Diana. Once a trusted friend of Maggie Radcliffe, Hubert is now an unwelcome house-sitter whom she wants evicted as quickly as possible.

Hubert is not so easily removed, however, and his intransigence and liquidation of Maggie's assets in the house (including Louis XIV Chairs, and a Gauguin painting) is mirrored in the loss of much of Maggie's wealth, from burglary to outright embezzlement of her entire estate. Events conspire however to cause both to review what they consider important.

== Themes ==
As with several other Spark novels, one theme is the disintegration of 'timeless' values in modern society, in this instance the role of religion (represented by Hubert's bogus Diana cult and two indolent, chortling Catholic priests) and the role of money: mostly unseen, or buried. A larger-scale backdrop is provided by the 1973 oil crisis.

Hubert's secretary, Pauline Thin, shares her surname with the Edinburgh-based stationer James Thin, who supplied Spark's notebooks in which she wrote all her novels in longhand.

== Reception ==
Kirkus Reviews states that the novel is "An elegant, wayward divertimento lighter than the soft Italian air of the Alban hills....Muriel Spark's most ambitious in some years. It can be read as a decorative, self-perpetuating comedy of urbane truths and consequences, or, as also intended, as a reprise and renewal of pagan mythology when our own Christian morality has been so decadently depreciated.

Margaret Drabble writing in The New York Times writes "We all like gloss: we like to read of those so wealthy that they can no longer afford to insure their possessions, and we love to suffer vicariously as they attempt to foil their predators...Muriel Spark raises the question: what lies beneath this dazzling game? Anything? Nothing? And, as ever, she leaves us on our own, for most of the book, to try to answer it... Muriel Spark drops her enigmatic allusions for long enough to tell us, plainly, that she is writing about money. In a couple of brilliant paragraphs, she describes the change that overtook the world in 1973, with the rise of Arab oil power and the fear of global recession." Drabble concludes: "Where is glittering sophistication in this new harsh world? What will Muriel Spark do next? Will she, like her heroine Maggie, put on shabbier clothes for a shabbier future, dissimulate, learn new tricks? Will she shake off the confines of a public image and a public style that have at times looked like a haute couture straight jacket? It is hard to praise a plain future and a Christian ethic in jewelled prose. It will be interesting to read the speculations of post-'73 Spark."
