= Coloni (surname) =

Coloni is an Italian surname. Notable people with the surname include:

- Enzo Coloni (born 1946), Italian former racing driver and owner of the Scuderia Coloni racing team
- Paolo Coloni (born 1969), Italian former racing driver
- Michel Coloni (1927 – 2016), French Catholic bishop
- Sergio Coloni (1932 – 2010), Italian politician

== See also ==
- Coloni (disambiguation)
- Colonna (surname)
