= The Dictator Pope =

Critical biography of Pope Francis

- Regnery Publishing edition cover
- Author: H. J. A. Sire (as "Marcantonio Colonna")
- Original title: Il Papa Dittatore
- Language: English, Italian
- Subject: Pope Francis
- Published: November 2017
- Publisher: Amazon Kindle (1st ed.); Regnery Publishing (revised English ed.)
- Publication place: Italy
- English publication date: December 2017 (1st ed.); April 23, 2018 (revised English ed.)
- Pages: 232 (hardcover)

The Dictator Pope: The Inside Story of the Francis Papacy (Italian: Il papa dittatore) is an unauthorized biography of Pope Francis authored by the Anglo–French historian H. J. A. Sire under the pseudonym "Marcantonio Colonna" (the name of a Catholic admiral who fought at the Battle of Lepanto). Published initially in Italian, and later in English, the book takes a highly critical view of Pope Francis and his papacy over the Catholic Church. The book contends to be "the inside story of the most tyrannical and unprincipled papacy of modern times," arguing that Pope Francis, while presenting himself as humble, rules over the Church through fear and has allied to some of the most corrupt elements in the Vatican. On its 2017 release, the book reached 4th place on Amazon Kindle's Religion and Spirituality bestseller list.

A revised and updated English edition of The Dictator Pope was released both in hardcover and e-book formats by Regnery Publishing on April 23, 2018. An audiobook edition produced by Blackstone Audio was also released the same day.

== Content ==
The book places the political and theological statements made by Pope Francis, as well as his leadership style, into a specifically Argentine context, comparing him to former President Juan Perón, whereby Perón during his political career was able to talk to diametrically opposed political tendencies and tell each of them that they were right and that he agreed with them. The book presents this supposed Peronist attitude as a kind of ruthless opportunism according to The Spectator.

Topics of discussion in the book include the background to Pope Francis' ascent to the Papacy, mentioning the St. Gallen Group of "liberal modernist" high ranking clerics, maturated under Cardinal Carlo Maria Martini who are alleged to have attempted to stop Cardinal Joseph Ratzinger from becoming pope during the 2005 Papal conclave. According to The Catholic Herald, the author alleges that this group adopted Bergoglio as their candidate for the 2013 Papal conclave, "With Martini dead, and most of the group coming within a hair of the cut-off age for participation in a conclave, time was running out – they knew this was their last realistic chance."

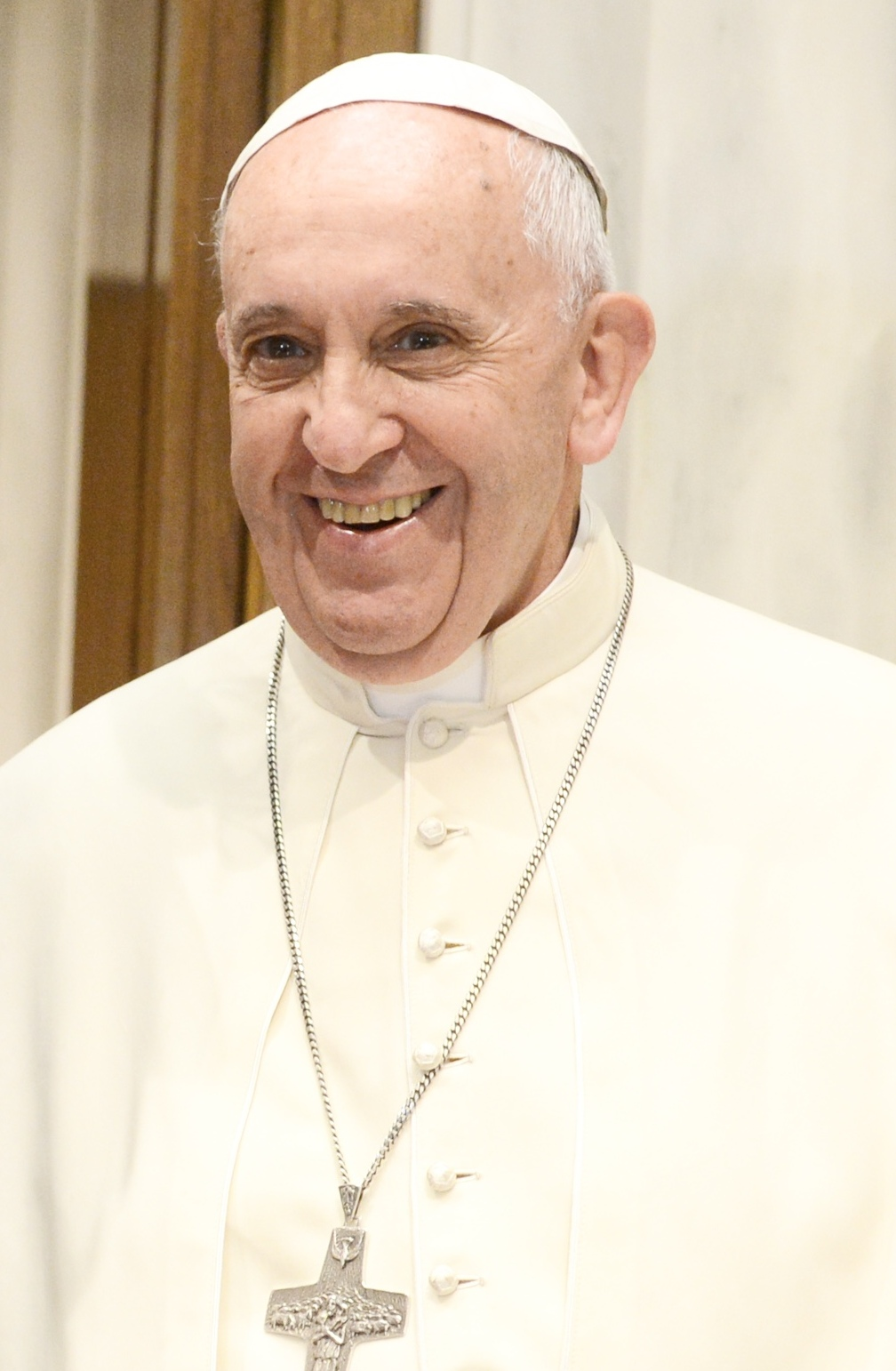
Pope Francis in 2015

The book states that much of the controversy surrounding the Synod on the Family was a product of the St. Gallen Group's desire to change Catholic moral teaching as it applied to giving Holy Communion to the divorced. He makes the claim, quoting Cardinal Wilfrid Napier, that Pope Francis deliberately stacked the Synod with prelates who agreed with his view. Also discussed are the Vatican's interventions in the cases of the Franciscan Friars of the Immaculate, the Sovereign Military Order of Malta and the firing of three members of the Congregation of the Doctrine of the Faith (which Cardinal Gerhard Ludwig Müller protested against). The book asserts that Pope Francis rules the Roman Curia "by fear".

According to The Australian, outside of theological concerns, a major topic in the book is the failure of Pope Francis' papacy when it comes to financial reform and the elimination of corruption in the Vatican. It specifically accuses four men of obstructing financial reform; Secretary of State Pietro Parolin, the head of the Vatican Bank, Domenico Calcagno, the Prefect for Catholic Education Giuseppe Versaldi and the President of the Pontifical Commission for Vatican City State, Giuseppe Bertello. It also discusses the police raid and subsequent confiscation of a large number of documents from the offices of Pope Francis-appointed Auditor General Libero Milone, who was forced to step down in September 2017 in murky circumstances. First Things reported that the book discusses how a professional financial audit by PwC, commissioned by Cardinal George Pell, was suspended in 2016 by Substitute for General Affairs, Archbishop Giovanni Angelo Becciu (under the orders of Cardinal Parolin).

The reception of Pope Francis's papacy by the secular western world, particularly the non-Catholic media is discussed, while the book says that his papacy is less popular with Catholics. This is contended by citing dropping attendance figures at St. Peter's Square for Papal weekly audiences from a high of 51,617 in 2013 to under 10,000 in 2016. The public image of Pope Francis as a humble man is also put under scrutiny.

== Reception ==
The book drew support from conservative and traditionalist-leaning lay publications such as The Catholic Thing, One Peter Five, The Remnant and ChurchMilitant.com. The book received mixed reviews from Dan Hitchens in the Catholic Herald and Philip Lawler in The Catholic World Report. Hitchens stated that the book contained unproven claims and was "not for the easily scandalised", but was "judiciously written and genuinely insightful". Hitchens questioned the author about the book's claim of a "disappeared report" by Peter Hans Kolvenbach, former Superior General of the Society of Jesus, which allegedly stated that a younger Pope Francis was "unsuitable" to be made a bishop because of "character defects". The author responded that it was not a rumour, but first-hand information from a priest who had read the report. Lawler stated that the book "is the product of a great deal of solid reporting", but criticised it for failing to provide evidence for its more extreme or implausible claims. He said that the fact that the work was pseudonymously self-published was likely to limit its readership, and that it suffered from a lack of copy-editing.

== Authorship ==
To conceal his identity, the author of the book decided to write under the pseudonym Marcantonio Colonna, an Italian nobleman who fought at the Battle of Lepanto. The author described himself as a historian who was educated at the University of Oxford, but is now living in Rome. "Colonna" said the reason he chose to keep his actual name private is due to the fear of retaliation, but expects to be "unmasked" by opponents eventually. He also said that Pope Francis has been shown a list of six people who they think could have been the author and that a person in England who had been misidentified "received threatening phone calls from Rome". Tess Livingstone of The Australian described in Rome a "frantic witch-hunt" to uncover the author.

On 19 March 2018, the author was revealed to be Henry (H. J. A.) Sire, born in 1949 at Barcelona of French ancestry. According to The Tablet, Sire, a historian and member of the Knights of Malta, had lived in Rome at the Knights' Grand Magistry Palace on the Via dei Condotti from 2013 to 2017 while researching for his book The Knights of Malta: A Modern Resurrection, at the behest of Fra Matthew Festing, the former Prince & Grand Master. Sire had studied in England at Stonyhurst College (a Jesuit institution) and at Exeter College, Oxford, before establishing himself as a Catholic historian. After Sire was revealed to be the author, the leadership of the Knights of Malta, now under Fra Giacomo dalla Torre del Tempio di Sanguinetto, suspended Sire's membership and distanced themselves from his critique of Pope Francis. The Order later expelled Sire on November 19, 2018.

== Editions in other languages ==
The Polish edition of The Dictator Pope (titled: Papież dyktator. Skrywana historia pontyfikatu papieża Franciszka) was to be released in the middle of November 2018.
