= Marcantonio Colonna (disambiguation) =

Marcantonio Colonna (1535–1584) was an Italian aristocrat who was an admiral of the Papal fleet at the Battle of Lepanto.

Marcantonio Colonna may also refer to:

- Marcantonio I Colonna (1478–1522), condottiero, lord of Frascati
- Marcantonio V Colonna (1606/10 – 1659), Prince of Paliano
- Marco Antonio Colonna (1523–1597), cardinal
- Marcantonio Colonna (cardinal) (1724–1793)
- Marcantonio Colonna (born 1949), pen name of British historian and author Henry Sire
