= Temple of Diana (Nemi) =

Archaeological site in Nemi, Italy

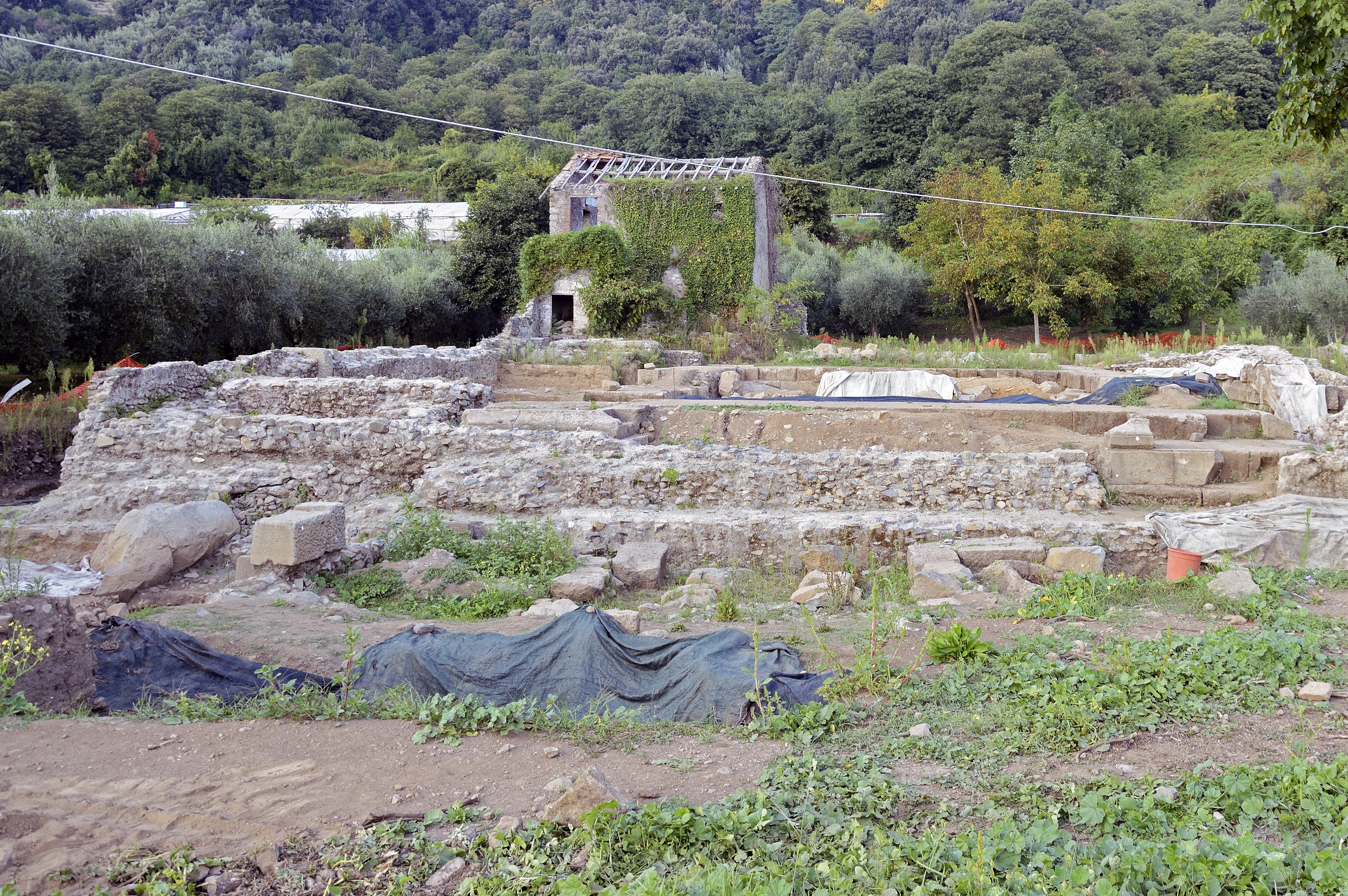

- Location within Lazio
- 41°43′28″N 12°42′33″E
- Type: sanctuary
- Periods: Roman Republic Roman Empire
- Location: Lazio, Italy
- Region: Provincia di Roma

Site notes
- Excavation dates: yes
- Public access: yes

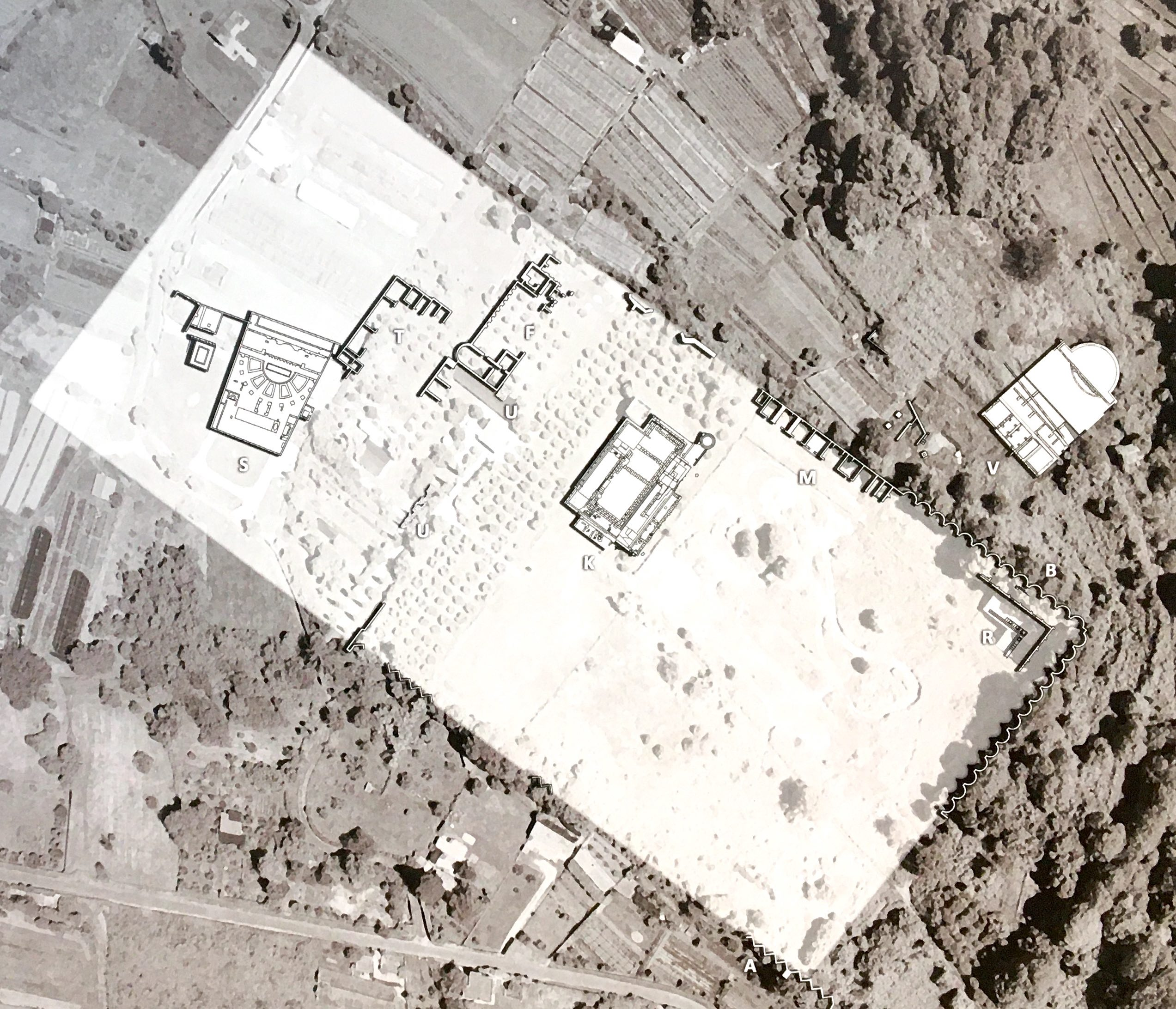
map of sanctuary K=temple S=Theatre T=baths V=nymphaeum R=portico B=wall of upper terrace

The Temple of Diana Nemorensis (Nemus Dianae) was part of an ancient Italic monumental sanctuary erected around 300 BC, and dedicated to the goddess Diana Nemorensis, or "Diana of the Wood". It was a popular place of worship until the late imperial age.

The temple was situated on the northern shore of Lake Nemi, beneath the rim of the crater and the modern city of Nemi, which take their names from the grove of Diana. Large parts of the terraces and buildings remain today.

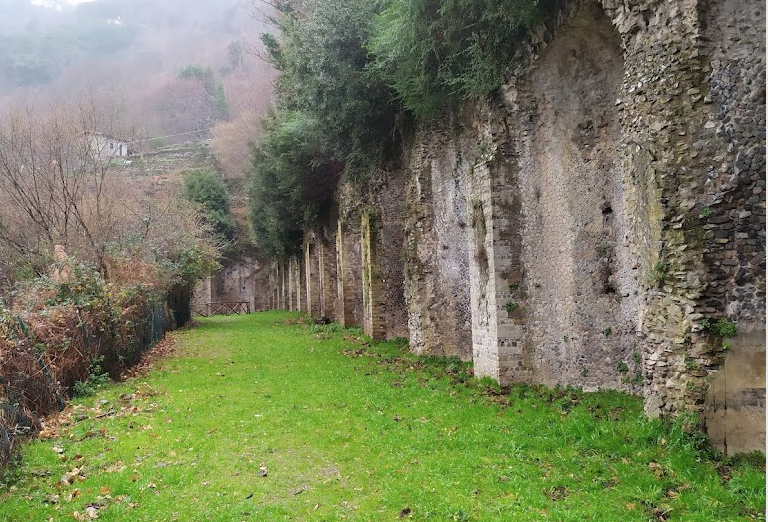
Terrace wall of temple

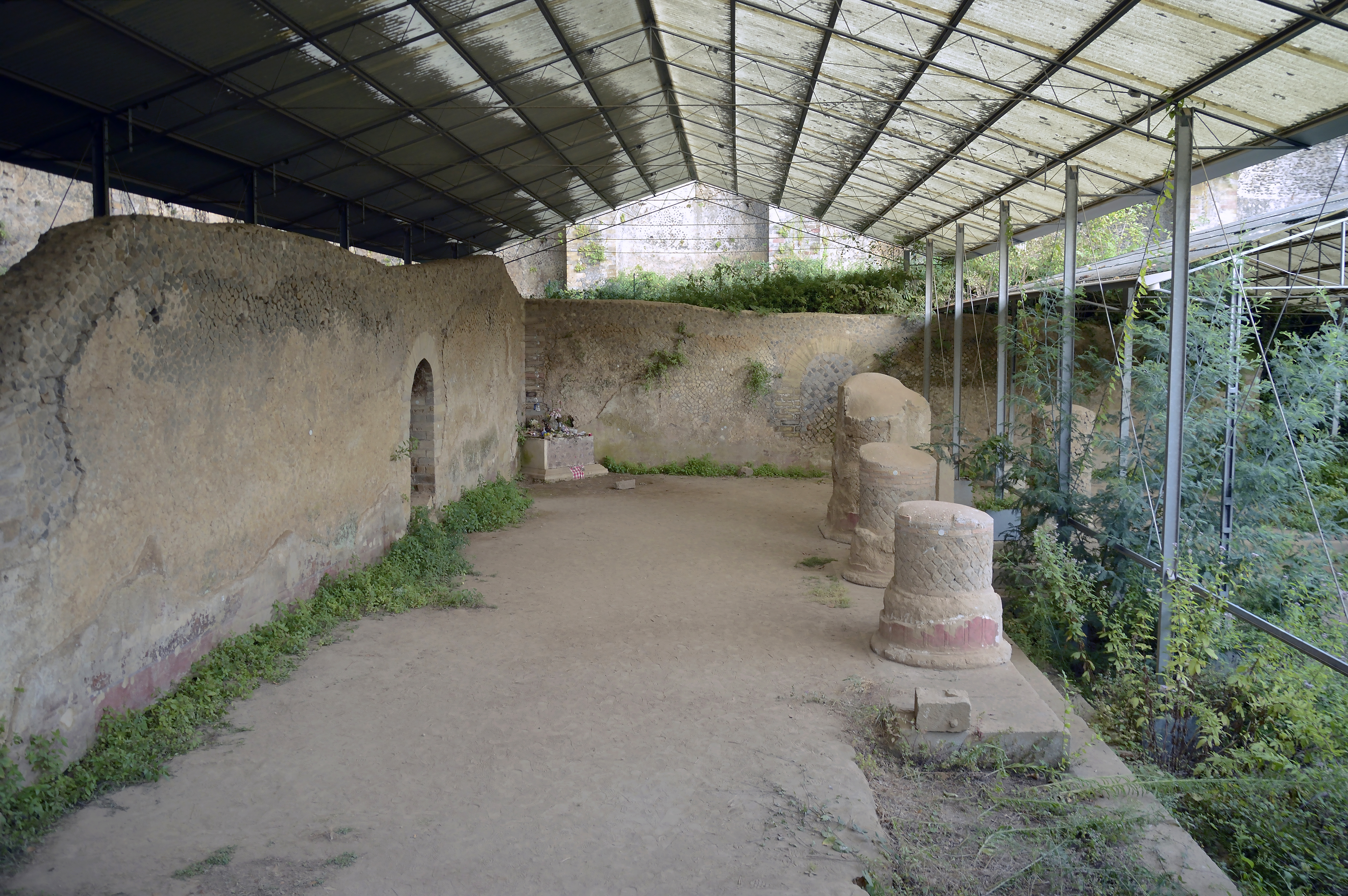
Altar and columns in the Temple

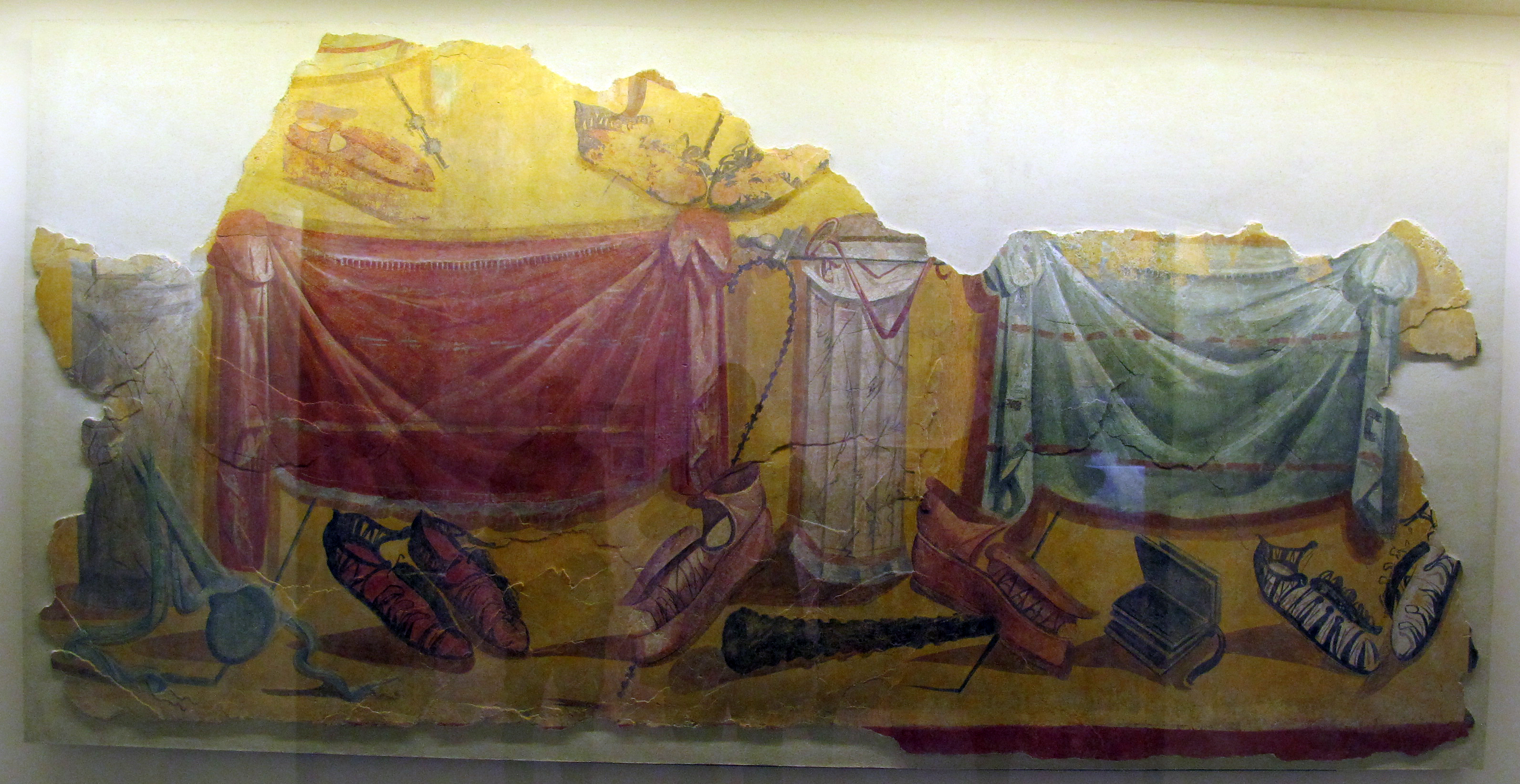
Fresco from the theatre, 2nd c. AD (museum of Terme di Diocletian)

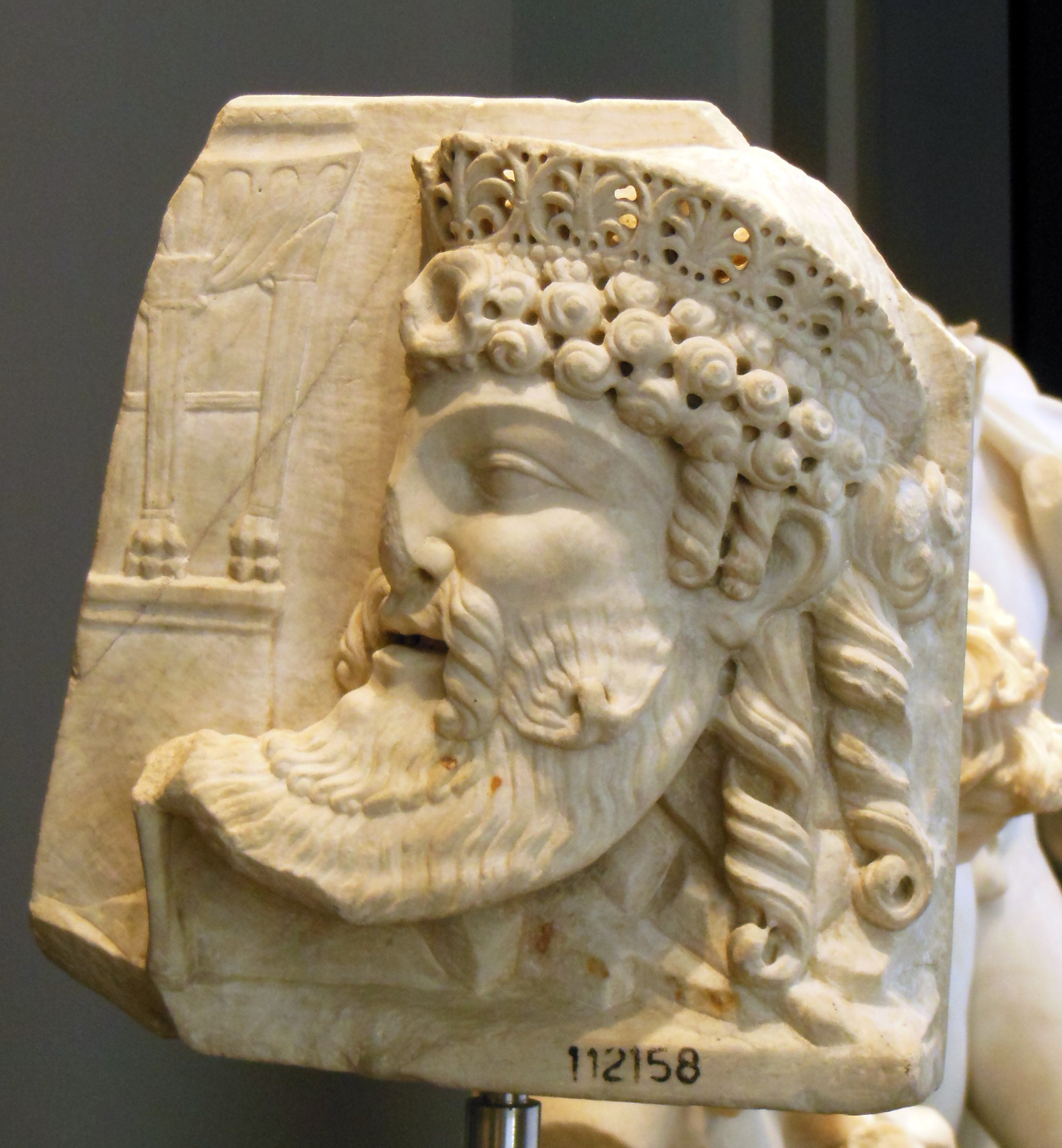
Relief from the theatre, 1st c. (museum Palazzo Massimo, Rome)

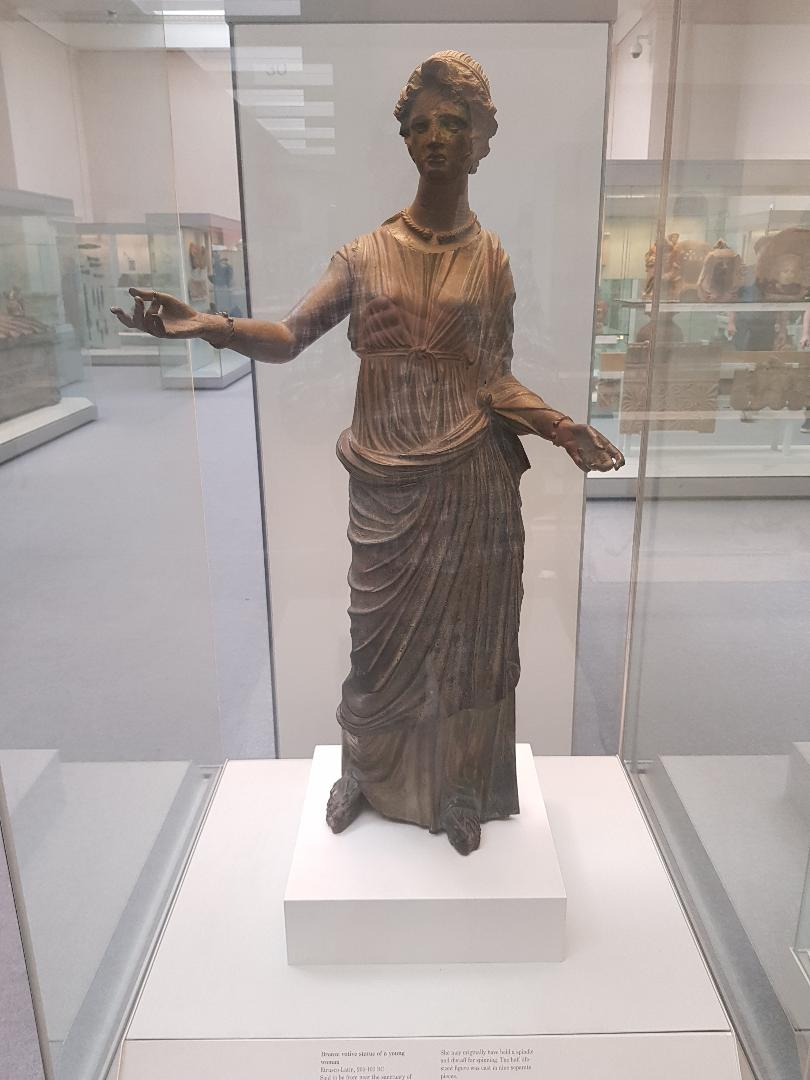
Bronze votive statue of a young woman, from the Sanctuary, British Museum (200-100 BC)

== Description ==
As at the other monumental Italic sanctuaries (e.g. Praeneste, Tibur, Terracina) it was built on one of several terraces on a hillside giving an imposing setting in the landscape. The main terrace measuring 200 x 175 m was supported below by triangular substructures while above was a massive wall with semicircular niches which supported an upper terrace and in which were probably statues. On the terrace ran two porticoes of the Doric order, one with red plastered columns, the other with dark gray peperino columns. The sanctuary included baths, theatre and a nymphaeum. There were also rooms for priests, lodgings for pilgrims and donation cells.

== History ==
Worship of Diana at Nemi may have flourished from at least the 6th century BC.

The sanctuary was held by the Latin cities in common (the Latin League) and presided over by the Rex Nemorensis. It was in the territory of the nearby town of Aricia which led to the town's development as an influential and affluent centre of healing and medicine.

The temple of Diana Nemorensis was preceded by the sacred grove of Aricia in which there stood a carved cult image which survived until as late as 43 BC when it was reflected in coinage. The Italic type of the triform cult image of Diana Nemorensis was shown in a sequence of later Republican period coins connected with a gens from Aricia.

A three-day festival to Diana, the Nemoralia, was held yearly on the Ides of August from at least the 6th century BC, coinciding with the traditional founding date. Records from the 1st century BC describe worshippers traveling to the sanctuary carrying torches and garlands. Diana's festival eventually became widely celebrated throughout Italy, including at the Temple of Diana on the Aventine Hill in Rome.

The temple was built in about 300 BC and was noted by Vitruvius as being archaic and "Etruscan" in its form. It continued in use until the late Roman Empire period when it was abandoned with the imposition of Christianity. Portions of its marbles and decorations were removed and the area of the temple was gradually covered by forest and generally left undisturbed for centuries.

Amateur, often foreign, archaeological excavations of the site began in the 1600s. As a result, statues of splendid workmanship are now found scattered in many museums such as the University of Pennsylvania, the Museum of Fine Arts (Boston) or in European museums such as the Nottingham Castle museum and the Ny Carlsberg Glyptotek.

A number of diminutive bronze statues of draped women and men, each holding libation bowls and incense boxes were found here, four of which are now in the British Museum's collection.

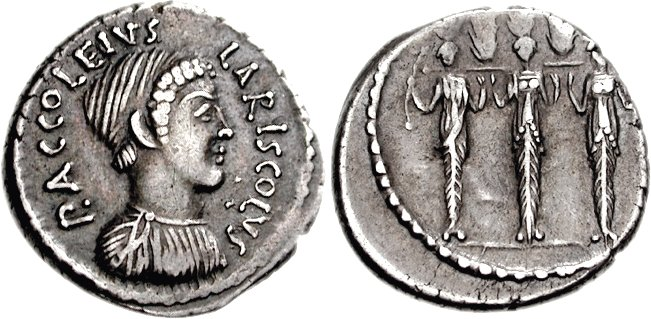
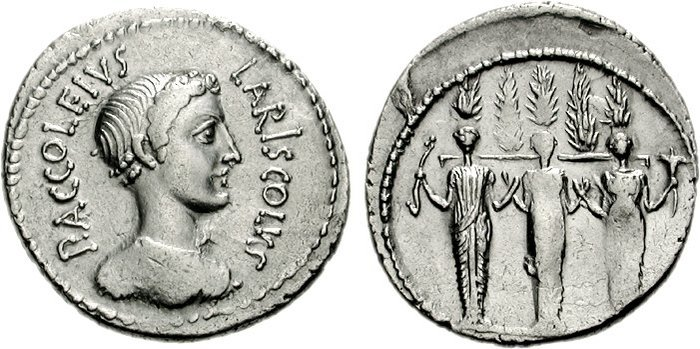
Two examples of the denarius (RRC 486/1) depicting the head of Diana Nemorensis and her triple cult statue

== Diana the Healer ==
This sanctuary was sacred to one of Diana’s epithets known as Diana the Healer. Diana’s role as a healer came about with the mythology of Hippolytus and his resurrection. This mythology along with a similarity in healing practices, is also the reason why Diana and Asclepius are so closely related. The sanctuary was visited by pilgrims seeking religious healing for their ailments. This temple in particular is thought to have been related to Diana’s healing ability due to the remains of anatomical votive offerings found at the site. Anatomical votives were made of terracotta and/or bronze. These types of votives generally include moldings of feet, eyes, hands, and different organs of the human body. Specifically at Nemi, votives of the eyes and a molding of the abdominal organs were found. Aside from anatomical votives, the other striking find from excavations are votives of surgical instruments, an offering more usually found at temples of Asclepius, highlighting the similarity in their cults. The sanctuary of Diana at Nemi was located at a crossroads that was south from Rome, close to the Via Appia, and likely generated a large religious traffic throughout its history. This healing sanctuary and its followers was notably different from other cults of Diana around the Mediterranean, noted for having a stronger community than is typical for this goddess, and focusing on an aspect, healing, generally not associated with her.

== Bibliography ==
- Giovanni Argoli, Epistola ad Jacobum Philippum Tomasinum de templo Dianae Nemorensis, in: Jacopo Filippo Tomasini, De donariis ac tabellis votivis liber singularis, Padova, 1654 in-4 pp. 13 ff.; reprinted in: Johann Georg Graevius, ed. (1699). Thesaurus antiquitatum romanarum. Vol. XII. pp. 751 ff.
- G. Ghini, Il Museo delle navi romane e Il Santuario di Diana di Nemi, Roma 1992.
- G. Ghini, F. Diosono, Il Santuario di Diana a Nemi: recenti acquisizioni dai nuovi scavi, in E. Marroni (ed.), Sacra Nominis Latini. I santuari del Lazio arcaico e repubblicano. Atti del Convegno, Roma 2009, Ostraka n.s. 2012, I, pp. 119–137.
- F. Coarelli, G. Ghini, F. Diosono, P. Braconi Il Santuario di Diana a Nemi. Le terrazze e il ninfeo. Scavi 1989-2009, Roma, L'Erma di Bretschneider, 2014, ISBN 978-88-913-0491-9.
- Sculpture from the Sanctuary of Diana Nemorensis at Lake Nemi. In: Irene Bald Romano (ed.): Classical sculpture: catalogue of the Cypriot, Greek, and Roman stone sculpture in the University of Pennsylvania Museum of Archaeology and Anthropology. University of Pennsylvania 2006, pp. 73–159.
- Giulia D'Angelo - Alberto Martín Esquivel, P. Accoleius - Lariscolus (RRC 486/1) in Annali dell'Istituto Italiano di Numismatica, 58 (2012), pp. 139–160.
