= Palazzo Colonna (disambiguation) =

Palazzo Colonna is a palace in Rome, Italy.

Palazzo Colonna may also refer to:

- Palazzo Colonna (Marino), historic building in the center of Marino, in the Roman Castles area of the Metropolitan City of Rome, Italy
- Palazzo Cesarò Colonna, former aristocratic palace in the historic center of Palermo, region of Sicily, Italy.

== See also ==
- Colonna (disambiguation)
