= Coloni =

Coloni may refer to:

- Coloni (ancient Rome), late Roman tenant farmers
- Coloni (surname), Italian surname
- Scuderia Coloni, a motor racing team
- Sharecroppers
- Qalunya, older name of this depopulated Palestinian village
