= Colonna =

Colonna is an Italian word for column. The name Colonna may refer to:

== People ==
- Colonna family, a noble family from Rome
- Colonna (surname), an Italian surname

== Places ==
Italy

- Colonna, Lazio, a comune in the Province of Rome
- Colonna, City of Rome, a rione in Rome
- Capo Colonna, a cape of Calabria
- Palazzo Colonna, a palatial block of buildings in central Rome
- Castel Colonna, a comune in the Province of Ancona

Malta

- Colonna Mediterranea, a monument in Luqa
