= Nemoralia =

Festival of Torches or Hecatean Ides

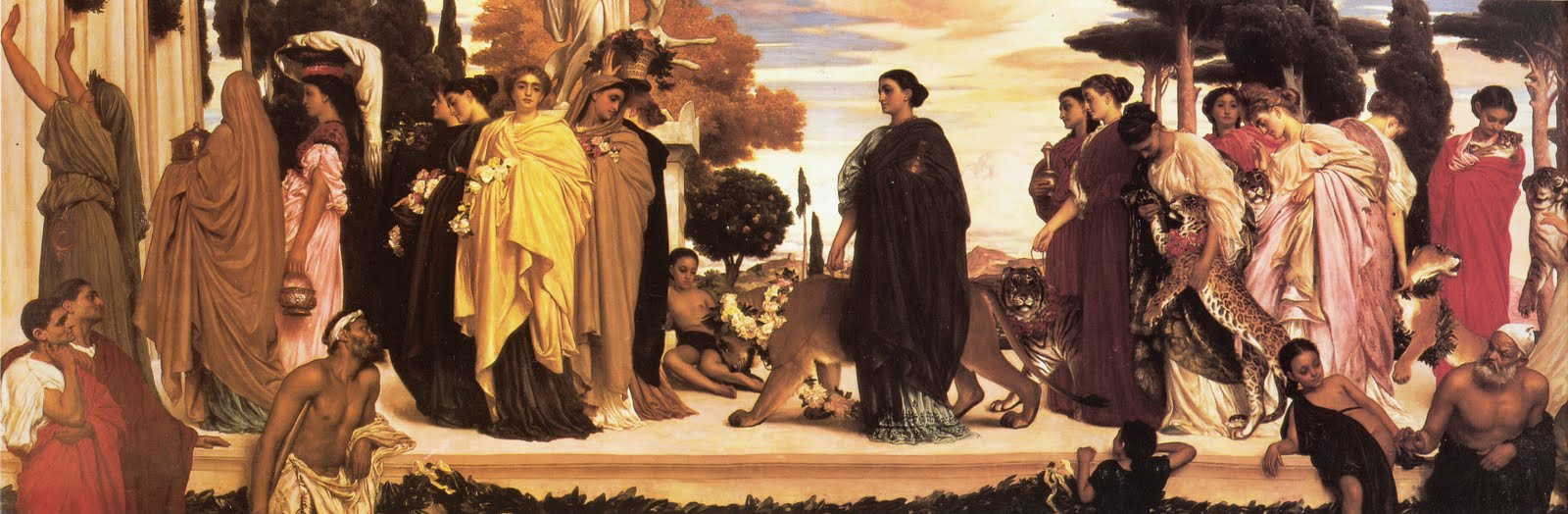
- The Syracusan Bride leading Wild Animals in Procession to the Temple of Diana by Lord Frederick Leighton, 1866.
- Also called: Festival of Torches
- Observed by: Roman Polytheists, Neopagans
- Type: Seasonal, religious
- Celebrations: Lighting candles and torches, wearing garlands and wreaths, making prayers and offerings to Diana by tying prayer ribbons and leaving tokens near bodies of water and other sacred places.
- Begins: 13 August
- Ends: 15 August
- Related to: The Feast of the Assumption

The Nemoralia (also known as the Festival of Torches or Hecatean Ides) is a three-day festival originally celebrated by the ancient Romans on the Ides of August (August 13–15) in honor of the goddess Diana. Although the Nemoralia was originally celebrated at the Sanctuary of Diana at Lake Nemi, it soon became more widely celebrated. The Catholic Church may have adapted the Nemoralia as the Feast of the Assumption.

== History ==
A festival to Diana was held yearly at her Shrine at Lake Nemi near Ariccia on the Ides of August, a date which coincides with the traditional founding date celebrated at Aricia. The origins of the festival probably pre-date the spread of Diana's worship to Rome in the 3rd century BCE, and may extend to the 6th century BCE or earlier. Records from the 1st century BCE describe worshipers traveling to the sanctuary carrying torches and garlands. Diana's festival eventually became widely celebrated throughout Italy, including at the Temple of Diana on the Aventine Hill in Rome, which was unusual given the provincial nature of Diana's cult.

== Symbolism ==
The 1st century CE poet Statius wrote of the festival:

It is the season when the most scorching region of the heavens takes over the land and the keen dog-star Sirius, so often struck by Hyperion's sun, burns the gasping fields. Now is the day when Trivia's Arician grove, convenient for fugitive kings, grows smoky, and the lake, having guilty knowledge of Hippolytus, glitters with the reflection of a multitude of torches; Diana herself garlands the deserving hunting dogs and polishes the arrowheads and allows the wild animals to go in safety, and at virtuous hearths all Italy celebrates the Hecatean Ides. (Statius Silv. 3.I.52-60)

Statius celebrated the triple nature of the goddess by invoking heavenly (the dog-star Sirius), earthly (the grove itself) and underworld (Hecatean) imagery. He also suggested, by the garlanding of the dogs and polishing of the spears, that no hunting was allowed during the festival.

The hunting dogs were particularly important symbols of the celebration. They symbolize Diana's guardianship of those in her care, and garlanded, they join in the celebration rather than in the hunt, so that no hunting can take place. This represents the protection of Diana being extended to all. Statius also emphasizes the importance of refuge to the worship of Diana, whose sanctuaries offered refuge to freed or escaped slaves, and in the myths of Hippolytus and Orestes, a refuge from murder, pollution, madness, and death. The 21st-century historian C.M.C. Green noted that "bearing a torch in the procession to the shrine was to flee the thanatos-laden world and to take refuge in the eternal world of the sacred, cool, shady, and nurturing."

== Observance ==
In the 1st century BCE, the Roman poet Ovid described the celebration:

"In the Arrician valley,
there is a lake surrounded by shady forests,
Held sacred by a religion from the olden times...
On a long fence hang many pieces of woven thread,
and many tablets are placed there
as grateful gifts to the Goddess.
Often does a woman whose prayers Diana answered,
With a wreath of flowers crowning her head,
Walk from Rome carrying a burning torch...
There a stream flows down gurgling from its rocky bed..."

On this day, worshipers formed a procession of torches and candles around the waters of Lake Nemi (the name Nemi, from the Latin nemus, means a sacred wood or sacred grove), also known as Diana's Mirror. Hundreds join together at the lake, wearing wreaths of flowers. According to Plutarch, part of the ritual (before the procession around the lake) was the washing of hair and dressing it with flowers. It is a day of rest for women and slaves. Hounds are also honored and dressed with blossoms. Travelers between the north and south banks of the lake were carried in small boats lit by lanterns. Similar lamps were used by Vestal virgins and have been found with images of the goddess at Nemi.

One 1st-century CE poet, Propertius, did not attend the festival, but observed it from the periphery as indicated in these words to his beloved:

"Ah, if you would only walk here in your leisure hours.
But we cannot meet today,
When I see you hurrying in excitement with a burning torch
To the grove of Nemi where you
Bear light in honour of the Goddess Diana."

Requests and offerings to Diana may include small baked clay or bread statuettes of body parts in need of healing; small clay images of mother and child; tiny sculptures of stags; dance and song; and fruit such as apples. In addition, offerings of garlic are made to the Goddess of the Dark Moon, Hecate, during the festival. Hunting or killing of any beast is forbidden on Nemoralia.

== Influence on Christian feast days ==
The three-day festival of Nemoralia corresponds to the Catholic feast days of Hippolytus of Rome (a supposed 3rd century CE martyr who shares a name with Hippolytus, a mythological figure heavily associated with Diana) on August 13, and the feast of Assumption of Mary on August 15. Scholars such as C.M. Green, James Frazer, and others have noted parallels between these feast days and have speculated that the early Catholic Church may have adapted not only the dates but the symbolism from the Nemoralia. It is possible that, as originally celebrated, the Nemoralia celebrated a descent of Diana into the underworld in search of Hippolytus or Virbius, followed by her ascent as queen of heaven and the full moon on the third day. Similar celebrations were recognized in the ancient world involving both Demeter and Isis, with whom Diana was often identified.
