= Rex Nemorensis =

Priest of the goddess Diana at Aricia in Italy

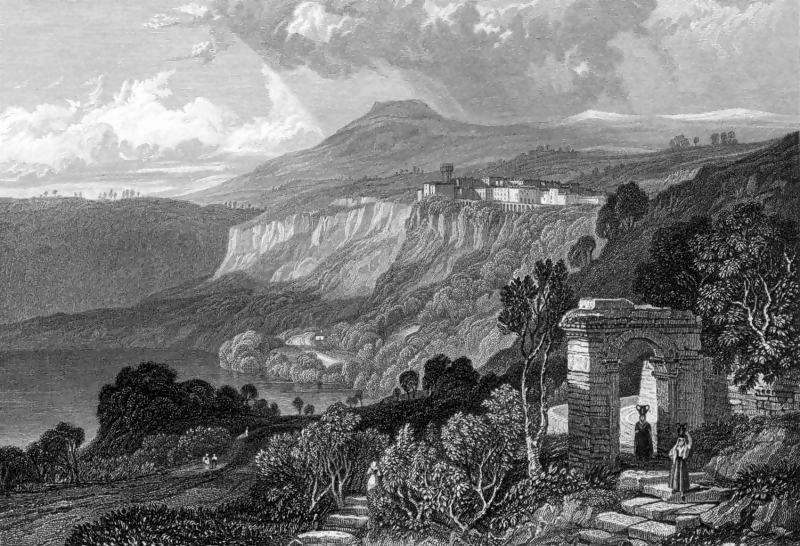
Ruins by the shores of Lake Nemi, in an 1831 engraving

The rex Nemorensis (Latin, "king of Nemi") was a priest of the goddess Diana at Aricia in Italy, by the shores of Lake Nemi, where she was known as Diana Nemorensis.

The priest was king of the sacred grove by the lake. No one was to break off any branch of a certain sacred oak, except that if a runaway slave did so, he could engage the Rex Nemorensis in mortal combat. If the slave prevailed, he became the next king for as long as he could, in turn, defeat challengers.

The priesthood played a major role in the mythography of James George Frazer in The Golden Bough; his interpretation has exerted a lasting influence.

== Ancient sources ==
The tale of the rex Nemorensis appears in a number of ancient sources. Ovid gives a poetic account of the priesthood of Nemi noting that the lake of Nemi was "sacred to antique religion"; its priest "holds his reign by strong hands and fleet feet, and dies according to the example he set himself." (Note: Regna tenent fortes manibus pedibusque fugaces, / et perit exemplo postmodo quisque suo.)

The Latin name of the priesthood is given by Suetonius: "He [Caligula] caused the rex Nemorensis, who had held his priesthood for many years, to be supplanted by a stronger adversary." (Note: Nemorensi regi, quod multos iam annos poteretur sacerdotio, validiorem adversarium subornavit.) That same passage indicates that by the time of the early Principate, the custom of succession in the office by combat had become subject to outside control.

The Greek geographer Strabo also mentions the institution: "and in fact a barbaric, and Scythian, element predominates in the sacred usages, for the people set up as priest merely a run-away slave who has slain with his own hand the man previously consecrated to that office; accordingly the priest is always armed with a sword, looking around for the attacks, and ready to defend himself."

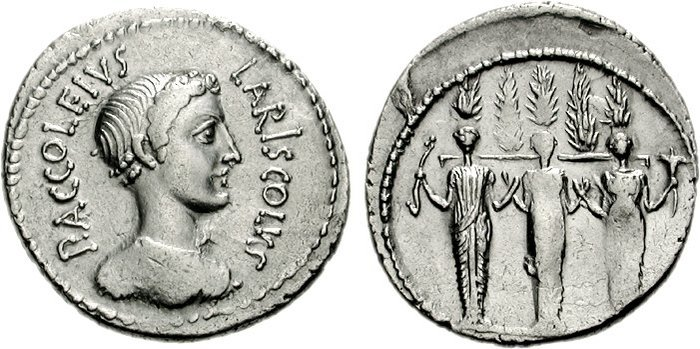
Denarius depicting Diana Nemorensis, who was conceived as a triple goddess (diva triformis)

Pausanias gives an etiological myth on the founding of the shrine:

The Aricians tell a tale ... that when Hippolytus (the son of Theseus) was killed, owing to the curses of Theseus, Asclepius raised him from the dead. On coming to life again he refused to forgive his father; rejecting his prayers, he went to the Aricians in Italy. There he became king and devoted a precinct to Artemis, where down to my time the prize for the victor in single combat was the priesthood of the goddess. The contest was open to no freeman, but only to slaves who had run away from their masters."

In Roman mythology, Hippolytus was deified as the god Virbius; Artemis was the Greek name of the goddess identified with the Roman Diana. A possible allusion to the origins of the priesthood at Nemi is contained in Vergil's Aeneid, as Virgil places Hippolytus at the grove of Aricia.

An alternative story has the worship of Diana at Nemi instituted by Orestes; the flight of the slave represents the flight of Orestes into exile.

== Ritual murder ==
Surviving lore concerning the rex Nemorensis indicates that this priest or king held a very uneasy position. Macaulay's quatrain on the institution of the rex Nemorensis states:

Those trees in whose dim shadow
The ghastly priest doth reign
The priest who slew the slayer,
And shall himself be slain.

This is, in a nutshell, the surviving legend of the rex Nemorensis: the priesthood of Diana at Nemi was held by a person who obtained that honour by slaying the prior incumbent in a trial by combat, and who could remain at the post only so long as he successfully defended his position against all challengers. However, a successful candidate had first to test his mettle by plucking a golden bough from one of the trees in the sacred grove.

The human sacrifice conducted at Nemi was thought to be highly unusual by the ancients. Suetonius mentions it as an example of the moral failings of Caligula. Strabo calls it Scythian, implying that he found it barbaric. The violent character of this singular institution could barely be justified by reference to its great antiquity and mythological sanctity. The ancient sources also appear to concur that an escaped slave who seeks refuge in this uneasy office is likely to be a desperate man.

== The Golden Bough ==
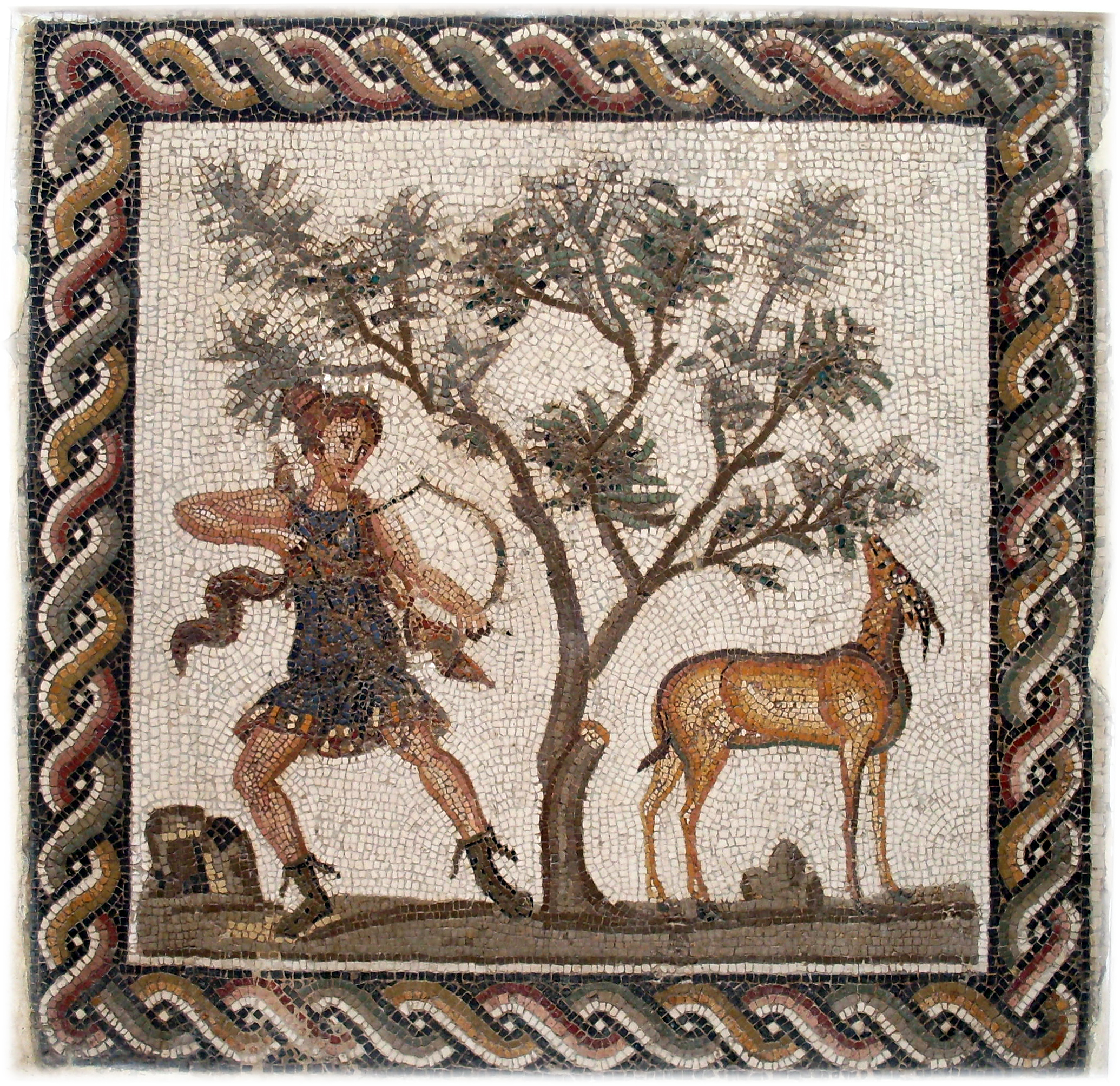
Diana in hunting boots, from a 2nd-century Roman mosaic

James George Frazer, in his seminal work The Golden Bough, argued that the tale of the priesthood of Nemi was an instance of a worldwide myth of a sacred king who must periodically die as part of a regular fertility rite.

In 1990, a radio programme entitled "The Priest of Nemi" was produced by Michael Bakewell and broadcast on BBC Radio 3. This programme was based on the 1990 book The Making of the Golden Bough by Robert Fraser, which was written to mark the centenary of the first edition of Frazer's book.

== Bibliography ==
- Fraser, Robert. The Making of the Golden Bough: The Origins and Growth of An Argument Macmillan, 1990. ISBN 0-333-49631-0
- Frazer, Sir James G. The Golden Bough Macmillan, 1950, abridged edition.
- Hornblower, Simon, et al. (eds.) The Oxford Classical Dictionary (3d edition. 2003) ISBN 0-19-860641-9
