= Synod on the Family =

Synod on the Family may refer to:

- The Fifth Ordinary General Assembly of the Synod of Bishops (1980)
- The Third Extraordinary General Assembly of the Synod of Bishops (2014)
- The Fourteenth Ordinary General Assembly of the Synod of Bishops (2015)
