= Niccolò Turrisi Colonna =

Italian politician (1817–1889)

Personal details
- Born: 10 August 1817 Palermo, Kingdom of the Two Sicilies
- Died: 13 May 1889 (aged 71) Palermo, Italy

Niccolò Turrisi Colonna (10 August 1817 – 13 May 1889), Baron of Gorgo and Bonvicino, was a Sicilian politician from Palermo.

He was a leading landowner and enlightened in the way he ran his business, studying agricultural science. He was a patriot even before the unification of Italy (Italian: il Risorgimento). After the annexation of Sicily by Italy in 1860, Turrisi Colonna was made leader of the Palermo National Guard. He became a member of the Italian Senate (1865) and in the 1880s served twice as mayor of Palermo.

In 1864, Turrisi Colonna wrote a study, Public Security in Sicily, in which he described a "sect of thieves" that operated across Sicily and which is considered to be an early description of the Mafia, although he did not mention the term. This "sect" had special signals to recognize each other, had political protection in many regions, and a code of loyalty and non-interaction with the police known as umirtà or omertà ("humility"). The sect was mostly rural, comprising plantation wardens and smugglers, among others. The sect made "affiliates every day of the brightest young people coming from the rural class, of the guardians of the fields in the Palermitan countryside, and of the large number of smugglers; a sect which gives and receives protection to and from certain men who make a living on traffic and internal commerce. It is a sect with little or no fear of public bodies, because its members believe that they can easily elude this."

Turrisi Colonna warned in his report that the Italian government's brutal attempts to crush unlawfulness only made the problem worse by alienating the populace. He seemed to have known what he was talking about, as there was widespread suspicion that he was the protector of some important Mafiosi in Palermo. Domenico Farini, longtime president of the Senate, recalled that some members of Parliament told him in private in 1876 that Turrisi Colonna was the head of the Mafia.

Political offices
Preceded by Salesio Balsano	Mayor of Palermo; 1881-1882	Succeeded by Piero Ugo delle Fave
Preceded by Giulio Benso Sammartino Duca della Verdura	Mayor of Palermo; 1886-1887	Succeeded by Giulio Benso Sammartino Duca della Verdura
