= Colonnese =

Colonnese is a surname. Notable people with the surname include:

- Elvira Colonnese (1859–1949), Italian soprano opera singer
- Eugenio Colonnese (1929–2008), Italian-born Brazilian comic artist
- Francesco Colonnese (born 1971), Italian footballer
