= Diana Nemorensis =

Mythical goddess version of Diana

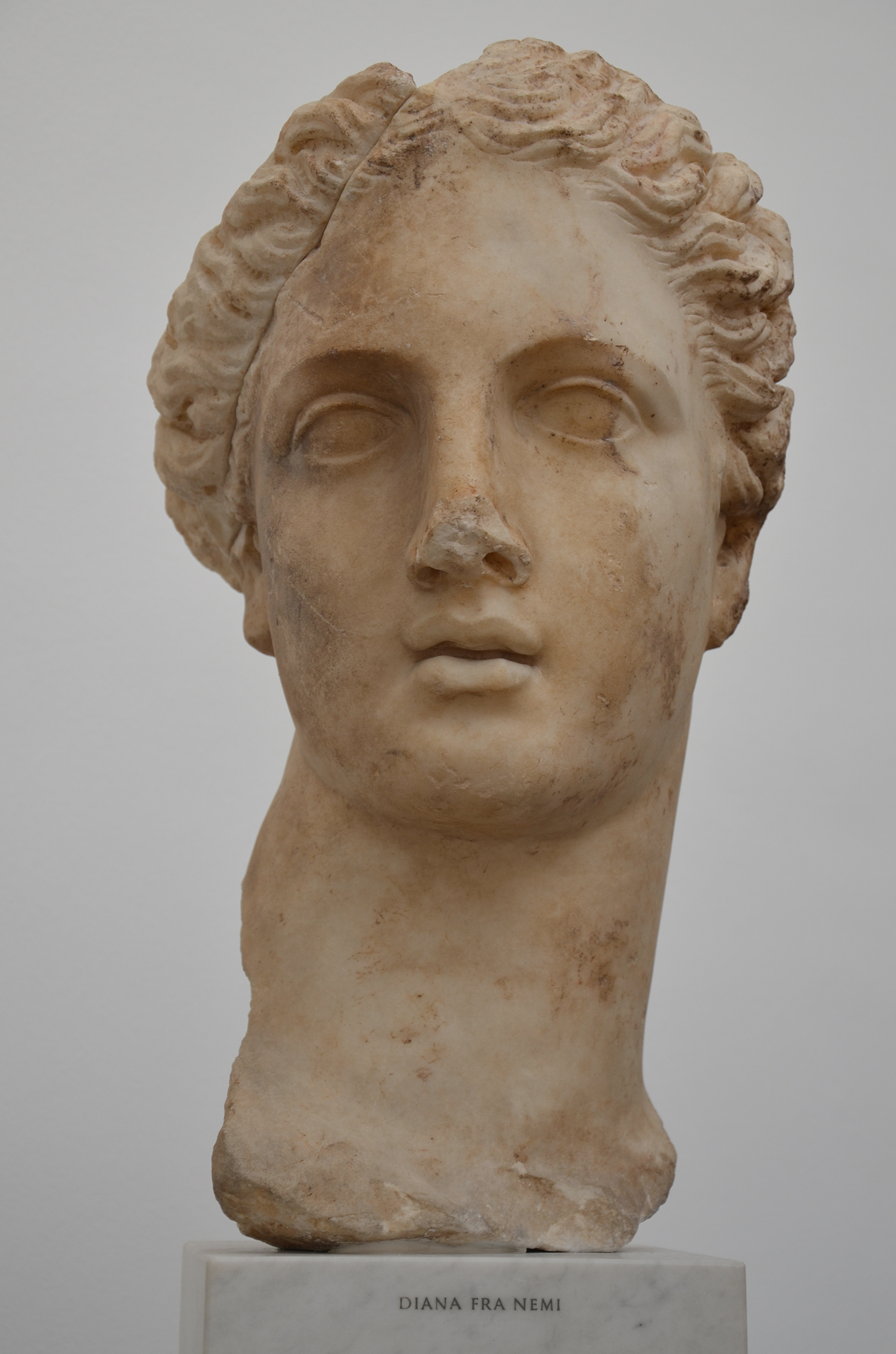
Diana Nemorensis from the sanctuary, (Ny Carlsberg Glyptotek, Copenhagen)

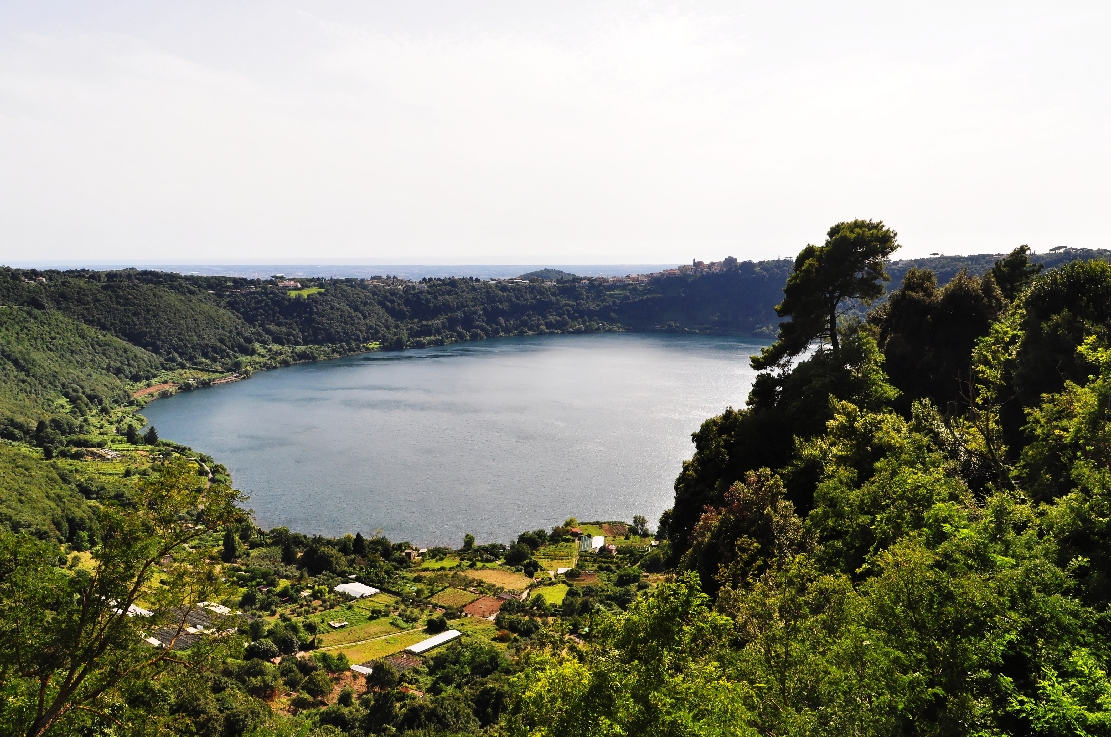
Lake Nemi

Diana Nemorensis ("Diana of Nemi"), also known as "Diana of the Wood", was an Italic form of the goddess who became Hellenised during the fourth century BC and conflated with Artemis. Her sanctuary is on the northern shore of Lake Nemi beneath the rim of the crater and the modern city Nemi.

== Legendary origin ==
The worship of Diana at Nemi was supposedly instituted by Orestes, who, after killing Thoas, king in the Tauric Chersonesus (the Crimea), fled with his sister Iphigenia to Italy, bringing with him the image of the Tauric Diana hidden in a mound of sticks. After his death, the myth has it, his bones were transported from Aricia to Rome and buried in front of the Temple of Saturn, on the Capitoline Hill, beside the Temple of Concord.

The bloody ritual which legend ascribed to the Tauric Diana is that every stranger who landed on the shore was sacrificed on her altar, but that, when transported to Italy, the rite of human sacrifice assumed a milder form.

== History ==
The temple of Diana Nemorensis was preceded by a sacred grove in which there stood a carved cult image. The temple was noted by Vitruvius as being archaic and "Etruscan" in its form. The cult image still stood as late as 43 BC, when it was reflected in coinage.

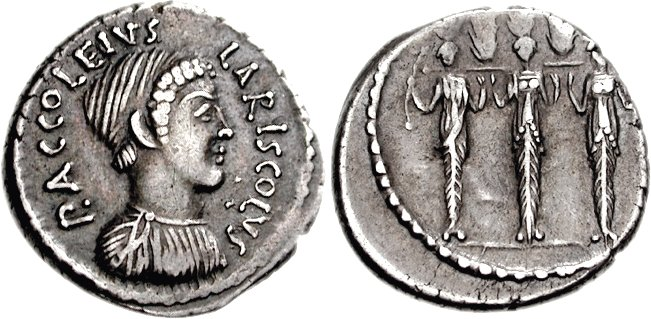
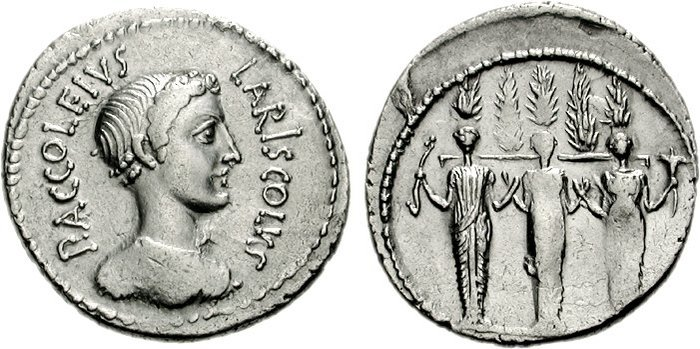
Two examples of the denarius (RRC 486/1) depicting the head of Diana Nemorensis and her triple cult statue

The Italic type of the triform cult image of Diana Nemorensis was reconstructed by Alföldi from a sequence of later Republican period coins he connected with a gens from Aricia. In early examples the three goddesses stand before a sketchily indicated wood, the central goddess placing her right hand on the shoulder of one goddess and her left on the hip of the other. The three are shown to be one by a horizontal bar behind their necks that connects them. Later die-cutters simplified the image. Alföldi interpreted the numismatic image as the Latin Diana "conceived as a threefold unity of the divine huntress, the Moon goddess, and the goddess of the nether world, Hekate," noting that Diana montium custos nemoremque virgo ("keeper of the mountains and virgin of Nemi") is addressed by Horace as diva triformis ("three-form goddess"). Diana is commonly addressed as Trivia by Virgil and Catullus.

The votive offerings, none earlier than the fourth century BC, found in the grove of Aricia portray her as a huntress, and further as blessing men and women with offspring, and granting expectant mothers an easy delivery. The dedicatory inscription, long disappeared, was copied for its curiosity as testimony to the political union of Latin cities, the Latin League by Cato the Elder and transmitted, perhaps incompletely, by the grammarian Priscianus:

Lucum Dianium in nemore Aricino Egerius Baebius Tusculanus dedicavit dictator Latinus. hi populi communiter: Tusculanus, Aricinus, Lanuvinus, Laurens, Coranus, Tiburtis, Pometinus, Ardeatis Rutulus

Diana Nemorensis was not translated to Republican Rome by the rite called evocatio, as was performed for Juno of Veii, but remained a foreigner there, in a temple outside the pomerium, apparently on the Aventine.

A votive inscription of the time of Nerva indicates that Vesta, Roman goddess of the hearth, home, and family, was also venerated in the grove at Nemi.

== Lake and Grove of Aricia ==
Legend tells of a tree that stands in the centre of the grove and is guarded heavily. No one was to break off its limbs, with the exception of a runaway slave who was allowed, if he could, to break off one of the boughs. He was then in turn granted the privilege to engage the Rex Nemorensis, the current king and priest of Diana in the region, in one-on-one mortal combat. If the slave prevailed, he became the next king for as long as he could defeat challengers.

By the time Caligula interfered in the succession of priest-kings, the murder-succession had devolved into a gladiatorial combat before an audience.

== See also ==
- Querquetulanae, oak nymphs who may have been associated with Diana Nemorensis
