= Nemi =

Administrative division of Lazio, Italy

- Comune
- Comune di Nemi
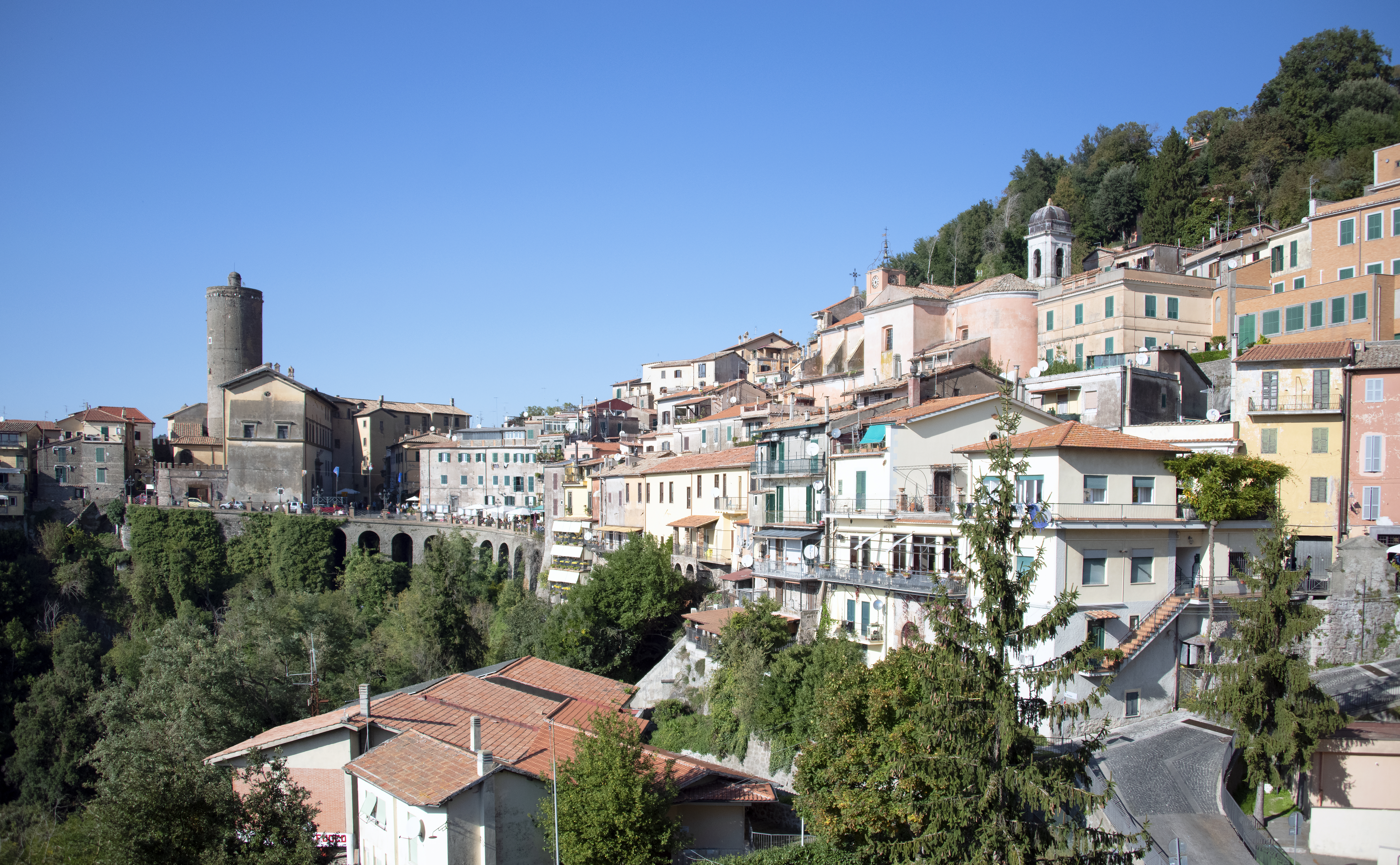
- View of Nemi

- Location within Italy Location within Lazio
- Coordinates: 41°43′N 12°43′E
- Country: Italy
- Region: Lazio
- Metropolitan city: Rome (RM)

Government
  - Mayor: Alberto Bertucci

Area
  - Total: 7 km^{2} (2.7 sq mi)
- Elevation: 521 m (1,709 ft)

Population (31 May 2015)
  - Total: 1,918
  - Density: 270/km^{2} (710/sq mi)
- Demonym: Nemorensi
- Time zone: UTC+1 (CET)
  - Summer (DST): UTC+2 (CEST)
- Postal code: 00074
- Dialing code: 06
- Patron saint: Sts. Philip and James
- Saint day: May 3
- Website: comunedinemi.rm.gov.it

Nemi is a town and comune in the Metropolitan City of Rome (central Italy), in the Alban Hills overlooking Lake Nemi, a volcanic crater lake. It is 6 kilometres (4 mi) northwest of Velletri and about 30 kilometres (19 mi) southeast of Rome.

The town's name derives from the Latin nemus, or "holy wood". In antiquity the area had no town, but the grove was the site of one of the most famous of Roman cults and temples: the Temple of Diana Nemorensis.

In 1514 Marcantonio I Colonna gave to Nemi the "Statuti e Capituli del Castello di Nemi". It is one of the I Borghi più belli d'Italia ("The most beautiful villages of Italy").

== Main sights ==
=== The Temple of Diana Nemorensis ===
The Temple of Diana Nemorensis was an ancient Roman sanctuary erected around 300 BC and dedicated to the goddess Diana although worship of Diana at Nemi flourished from at least the 6th century BC

The temple was situated on the northern shore of Lake Nemi beneath the cliffs of the modern city Nemi (Latin nemus Aricinum). It was a famous place of pilgrimage in the Italian Peninsula.

The temple was abandoned at some point in the late Roman Empire period. Portions of its marbles and decorations were removed. The area of the temple was gradually covered by forest and generally left undisturbed for centuries.

Amateur archaeological excavations of the site began in the 1600s.

=== Caligula's ships ===
Possibly in connection with the cult of Diana Nemorensis, Roman emperor Caligula built several very large and costly luxury barges for use on the lake. One ship was a shrine dedicated to ceremonies for the Egyptian Isis cult or the cult of Diana Nemorensis, designed to be towed, and the other was a pleasure boat with buildings on it. After Caligula's overthrow, the boats were scuttled.

The ships were rediscovered during the Renaissance, when architect Leon Battista Alberti is reported to have attempted to raise the ships by roping them to buoyant barrels. While ingenious, this method proved unsuccessful, because of extensive rotting.

The boats were finally salvaged from 1929 to 1932 under orders of Benito Mussolini. This was just one of many attempts to relate himself to the Roman Emperors of the past. The ships were exposed by lowering the lake level using underground canals that were dug by the ancient Romans. The excavation was led by Guido Ucelli and was reported in Le Navi di Nemi by Guido Ucelli (Rome, 1950). They were destroyed by fire on 31 May 1944, it is disputed whether this was done by defeated German forces retreating from Italy at the end of World War II or accidentally by squatters taking refuge in the museum building. Surviving remnants from the excavations as well as replicas are now displayed in the Museo Nazionale Romano at the Palazzo Massimo in Rome. The remains of the ship hulls survive today at Museo delle Navi Romane, Nemi.

=== Other sights ===
Nemi itself is home to a few late medieval to 18th‑century churches, and the Castello Ruspoli, dominating both town and landscape, the core of which dates to the 10th century.

== Strawberries ==
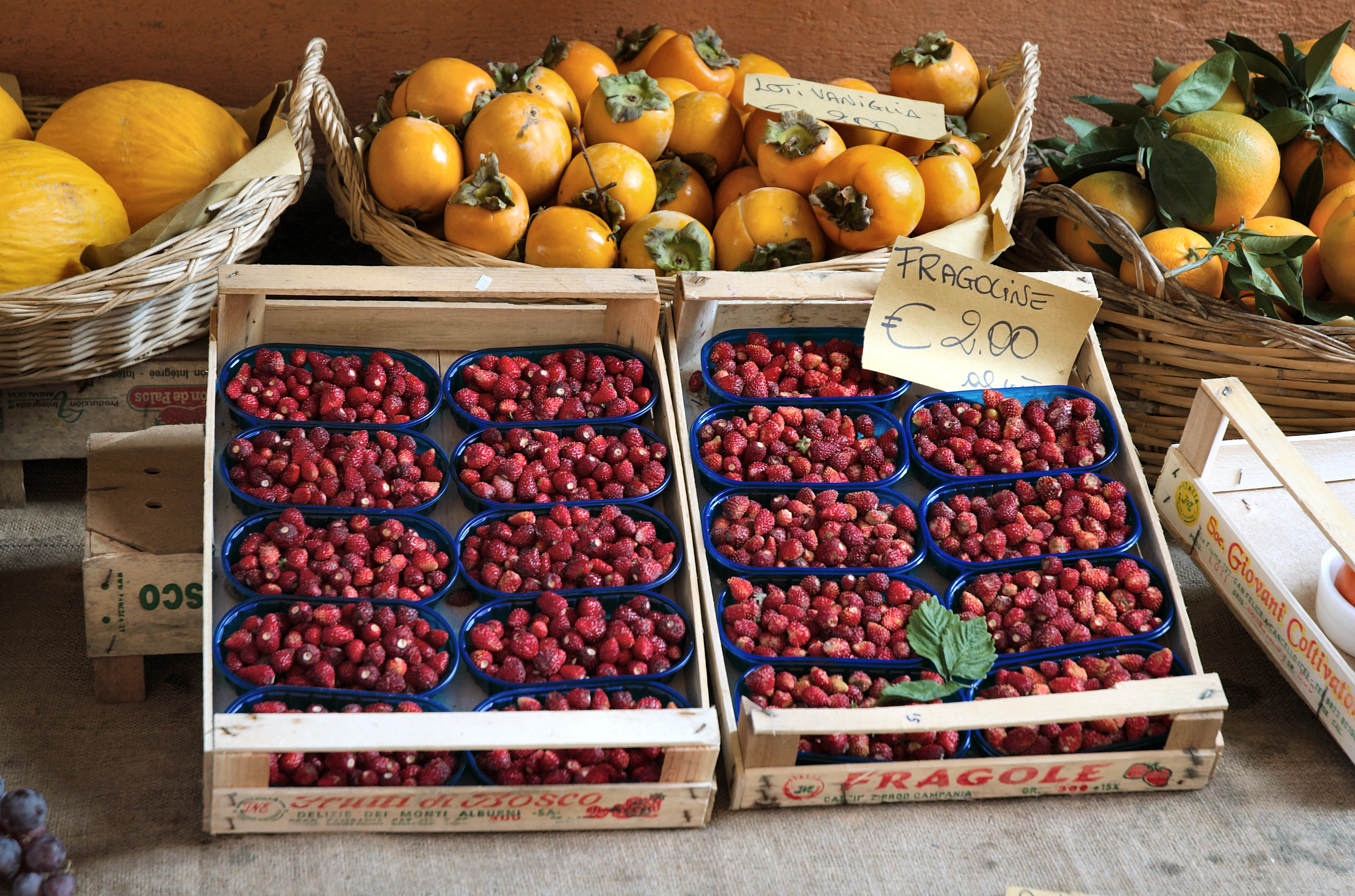
Strawberries for sale in Nemi.

Nemi is famous for its wild strawberries, which are smaller and sweeter than commercially grown varieties. Nemi's strawberries are grown on the sides of the volcanic crater, which creates a microclimate that retains the warmth of the sun and provides a wind shield. Nemi conducts an annual festival of strawberries.
