= Marcantonio I Colonna =

Italian condottiero

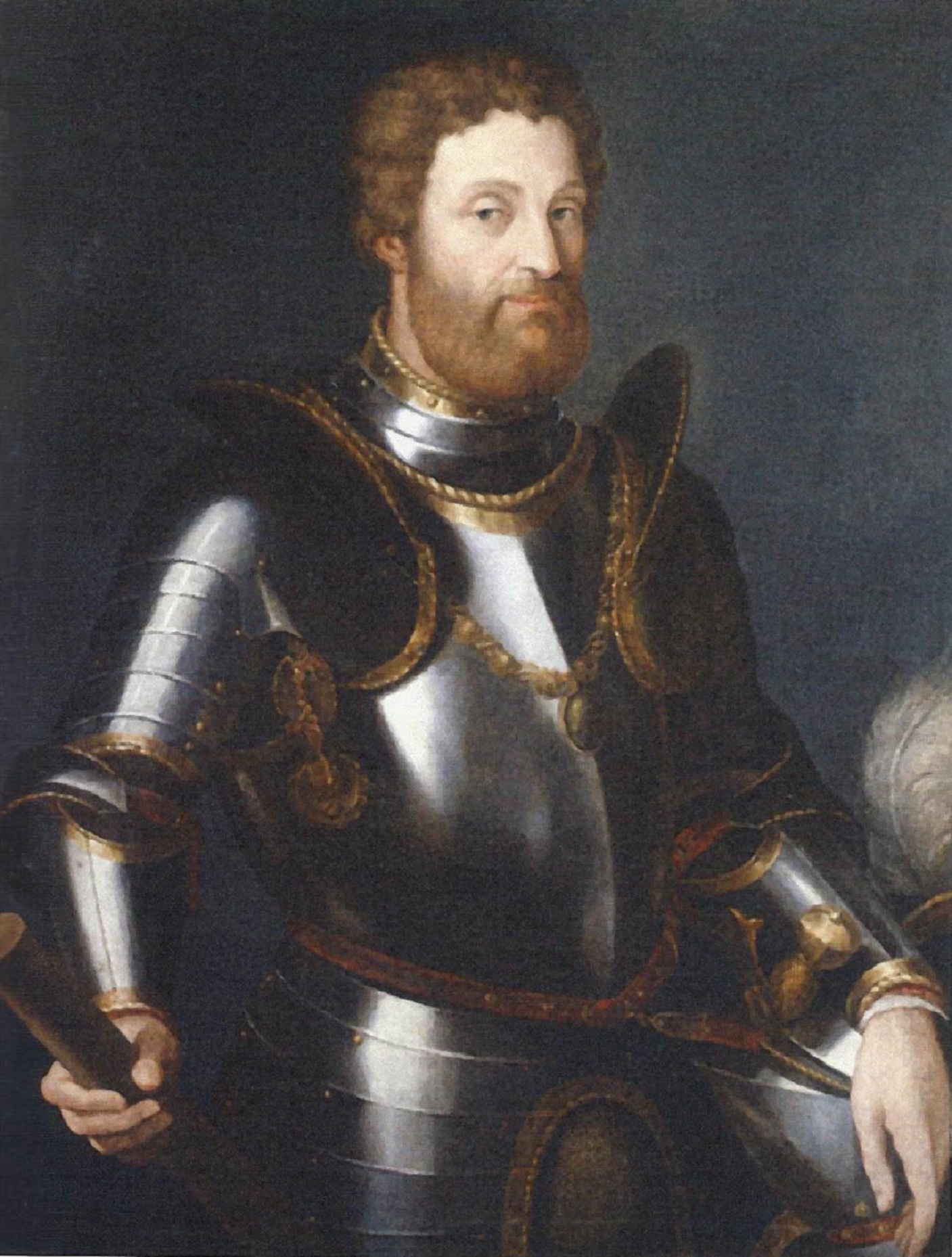
Portrait of Marcantonio I Colonna

Marcantonio I Colonna (1478 – Milan, 1522) was an Italian condottiero from the Colonna family.

He was the son of Pietro Antonio, prince of Paliano, and started his military career at the age of 24. He became a renowned condottiero, since 1502 in the service of Republic of Florence, and later of Pope Julius II. He fought along with his uncles Prospero and Fabrizio in the Battle of Cerignola.

He married Lucrezia della Rovere (1485–1552), the Pope's niece, receiving as dowry the castle of Frascati, where Colonna gave Frascati in 1515 its first statute, Statuti e Capituli del Castello di Frascati. The previous year he had also given to Nemi the "Statuti e Capituli del Castello di Nemi", the first city statute with rules and regulations to observe.

Later he distinguished himself fighting for Republic of Venice and then served the King of France, fighting his former employer, the Pope.

In 1522 he organized the siege the Milan against the Spanish, led by his own uncle Prospero, but while inspecting the front lines along with Camillo Trivulzio, was hit by a cannon shot and fell mortally wounded.

There are few depictions of Marcantonio Colonna in historical sources, but a picture of him can be found in a book of Philadelphus Mugnos.

== Depictions in fiction ==
Marcantonio Colonna was a minor character in the 2011 television series The Borgias.
