= Henry Sire =

Spanish-born British historian (born 1949)

Henry J. A. Sire (born 1949) is a Spanish-born British historian, Catholic author and a former Knight of the Sovereign Military Order of Malta. He was suspended and later expelled from the Order.

== Life ==
Sire, who has French ancestry, was born in Barcelona in the mid-twentieth century. He was educated at Stonyhurst College in Lancashire and Exeter College, Oxford, where he read history. Sire joined the Order of Malta in 2001 and was contracted to write a history of the Order. He lived in the Order's headquarters in Rome from 2013 to 2017. The history was published in 2016. He has established himself as a traditionalist Catholic, critic of innovations which he considers discordant with the Church's tradition and consistent teaching.

In 2015, Sire published Phoenix from the Ashes: The Making, Unmaking, and Restoration of Catholic Tradition, a highly critical approach to the Second Vatican Council and its effects on the Catholic Church, in which he concludes: "The fact needs to be clearly stated: the Second Vatican Council was a betrayal of the Church's faith. Its consequences cannot be put right until that betrayal has been recognized and reversed."

In 2017, under the pen-name "Marcantonio Colonna", Sire published (initially as a self-publication) a book entitled The Dictator Pope, in which he criticized the pontificate of Pope Francis. Sire revealed his authorship in March 2018, one month before the publication of the revised and updated English edition, resulting in his suspension from the Order of Malta. On November 19, 2018, Fra’ Giacomo Dalla Torre, the Grand Master of the Sovereign Order of the Knights of Malta, issued a decree expelling Sire stating that "the Order of Malta dissociates itself from the positions conveyed and considers the content of the book a grave offence to His Holiness, Pope Francis". However, Sire plans to appeal this decision.

== Bibliography ==
- Gentlemen Philosophers: Catholic Higher Education at Liège and Stonyhurst, 1774–1916, Churchman, 1988
- The Knights of Malta, Yale University Press, 1994
- Father Martin D'Arcy : Philosopher of Christian Love, Gracewing, 1997
- Phoenix from the Ashes: The Making, Unmaking, and Restoration of Catholic Tradition, Angelico Press, 2015
- The Knights of Malta: A Modern Resurrection, Profile Books, 2016
- The Dictator Pope: The Inside Story of the Francis Papacy, Regnery Publishing (Revised and updated edition), 2018 (Note: Credited as "Marcantonio Colonna" on the cover of the hardcover edition. Identified as "Henry Sire" on the inside flap of the dust jacket, as well as on the book's copyright page.)
