= 1699 =

1699 in various calendars
- Gregorian calendar: 1699; MDCXCIX
- Ab urbe condita: 2452
- Armenian calendar: 1148; ԹՎ ՌՃԽԸ
- Assyrian calendar: 6449
- Balinese saka calendar: 1620–1621
- Bengali calendar: 1105–1106
- Berber calendar: 2649
- English Regnal year: 11 Will. 3 – 12 Will. 3
- Buddhist calendar: 2243
- Burmese calendar: 1061
- Byzantine calendar: 7207–7208
- Chinese calendar: 戊寅年 (Earth Tiger); 4396 or 4189 — to — 己卯年 (Earth Rabbit); 4397 or 4190
- Coptic calendar: 1415–1416
- Discordian calendar: 2865
- Ethiopian calendar: 1691–1692
- Hebrew calendar: 5459–5460
- Hindu calendars
- Vikram Samvat: 1755–1756
- Shaka Samvat: 1620–1621
- Kali Yuga: 4799–4800
- Holocene calendar: 11699
- Igbo calendar: 699–700
- Iranian calendar: 1077–1078
- Islamic calendar: 1110–1111
- Japanese calendar: Genroku 12 (元禄１２年)
- Javanese calendar: 1622–1623
- Julian calendar: Gregorian minus 10 days
- Korean calendar: 4032
- Minguo calendar: 213 before ROC 民前213年
- Nanakshahi calendar: 231
- Thai solar calendar: 2241–2242
- Tibetan calendar: ས་ཕོ་སྟག་ལོ་ (male Earth-Tiger); 1825 or 1444 or 672 — to — ས་མོ་ཡོས་ལོ་ (female Earth-Hare); 1826 or 1445 or 673

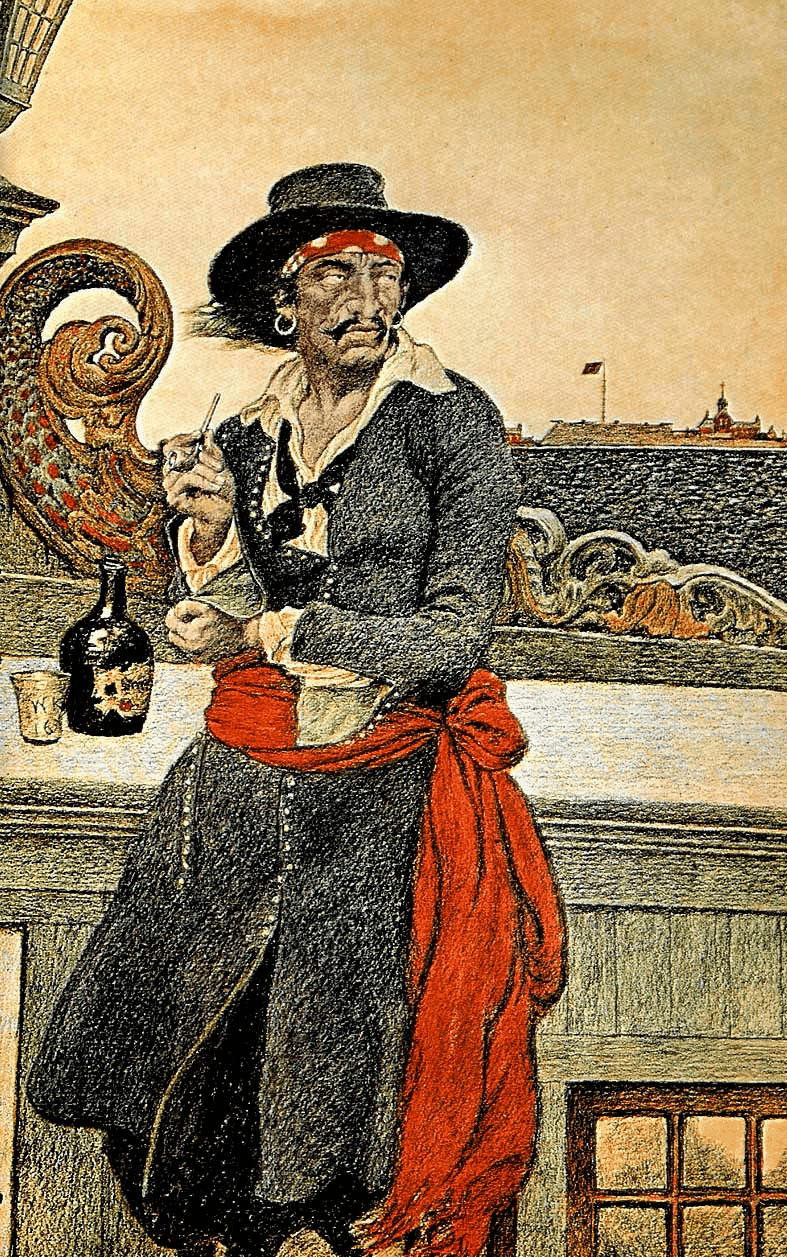
July 6: Captain William Kidd arrested for piracy in Boston.

1699 (MDCXCIX) was a common year starting on Thursday of the Gregorian calendar and a common year starting on Sunday of the Julian calendar, the 1699th year of the Common Era (CE) and Anno Domini (AD) designations, the 699th year of the 2nd millennium, the 99th year of the 17th century, and the 10th and last year of the 1690s decade. As of the start of 1699, the Gregorian calendar was 10 days ahead of the Julian calendar, which remained in localized use until 1923.

== Events ==
=== January–March ===
- January 5 – A violent earthquake damages the city of Batavia on the Indonesian island of Java, killing at least 28 people.
- January 20 – The Parliament of England (under Tory dominance) limits the size of the country's standing army to 7,000 'native born' men; hence, King William III's Dutch Blue Guards cannot serve in the line. By an Act of February 1, it also requires disbandment of foreign troops in Ireland.
- January 26 – The Republic of Venice, Polish–Lithuanian Commonwealth and Holy Roman Empire sign the Treaty of Karlowitz with the Ottoman Empire, marking an end to the major phase of the Ottoman–Habsburg wars. The treaty marks a major geopolitical shift, as the Ottoman Empire subsequently abandons its expansionism and adopts a defensive posture while the Habsburg monarchy expands its influence.
- February 4 – A group of 350 rebels in the Streltsy Uprising are executed in Moscow.
- March 2 – The Edinburgh Gazette is first published in Scotland.
- March 4 – Jews are expelled from Lübeck, Germany.
- March 26 – The first performance of Amadis de Grèce, an opera by French composer André Cardinal Destouches, takes place at the Académie Royale de Musique, Paris.
- March 31 – A total solar eclipse is visible across the southern Indian Ocean.

=== April–June ===
- April 13 – The 10th Sikh guru, Guru Gobind Singh, creates the Khalsa at Anandpur Sahib.
- May 1 – Pierre Le Moyne d'Iberville founds the first European settlement in the Mississippi River Valley, at Fort Maurepas (Ocean Springs, Mississippi).
- May 1 (O.S.) – A series of five student orations at the College of William & Mary precipitate the Colony of Virginia's capital moving from Jamestown to Middle Plantation, resulting in the establishment of Williamsburg.
- May 10 – Billingsgate Fish Market in London is sanctioned as a permanent institution by an Act of Parliament, with the provision "that after the tenth of May, 1699, Billingsgate Market should be, every day in the week except Sunday, a free and open market for all sorts of fish, and that it should be lawful for any person to buy or sell any sort of fish without disturbance."
- June 11 – England, France and the Dutch Republic agree on the terms of the Treaty of London (1700) (Second Partition Treaty) for Spain.
- June 14 – Thomas Savery demonstrates his first steam pump to the Royal Society of London.

=== July–September ===
- July 6 – Scottish-born pirate captain William Kidd is arrested and imprisoned in Boston, Province of Massachusetts Bay, after being tricked by his former patron New York Governor Richard Coote, 1st Earl of Bellomont.
- July 26 – William Dampier's expedition to New Holland (Australia), in HMS Roebuck, reaches Dirk Hartog Island, at the mouth of what he calls Shark Bay in Western Australia, and he begins producing the first known detailed record of Australian flora and fauna.
- August 25 – Christian V, King of Denmark–Norway since 1670, dies and is succeeded by his son, Frederick IV (to 1730).
- September 23 – A total solar eclipse is visible in the northern hemisphere across Europe, the Middle East and north India.

=== October–December ===
- October 3 – The Liverpool Merchant, the first slave ship to depart from the Port of Liverpool, sets sail for West Africa where it embarks hundreds of African slaves and sails for Barbados, arriving there on September 18, 1700 with 220 slaves on board.
- October 11 – The opera Marthésie, première reine des Amazones (Marthesia, First Queen of the Amazons), composed by André Cardinal Destouches, is performed for the first time, premiering at Fontainebleau near Paris.
- October – An edict by King Louis XIV establishes an office of police magistrate in almost every village in France, with the title of lieutenant general de police created.
- November 22 – The Treaty of Preobrazhenskoye, negotiated by Johann Patkul, is signed at a palace of the Tsar of Russia Peter the Great, and representatives of Augustus the Strong, Elector of Saxony, King of Poland and Elector of Saxony to provide for the partition of Swedish Empire between Saxony, the Polish-Lithuanian Commonwealth, the Kingdoms of Denmark-Norway and the Russian Empire. The attack on Sweden, which takes place on February 22, starts the Great Northern War.
- December 3 – Baron Jacob Hop is appointed as the treasurer-general of The Hague.
- December 10 – A major ice storm shuts down the city of Boston for a week and freezing rain brings down many tree branches and causes severe damage to orchards.
- December 20 – Peter the Great orders the Russian New Year changed, from September 1 (the start of the Byzantine year) to January 1.

== Births ==
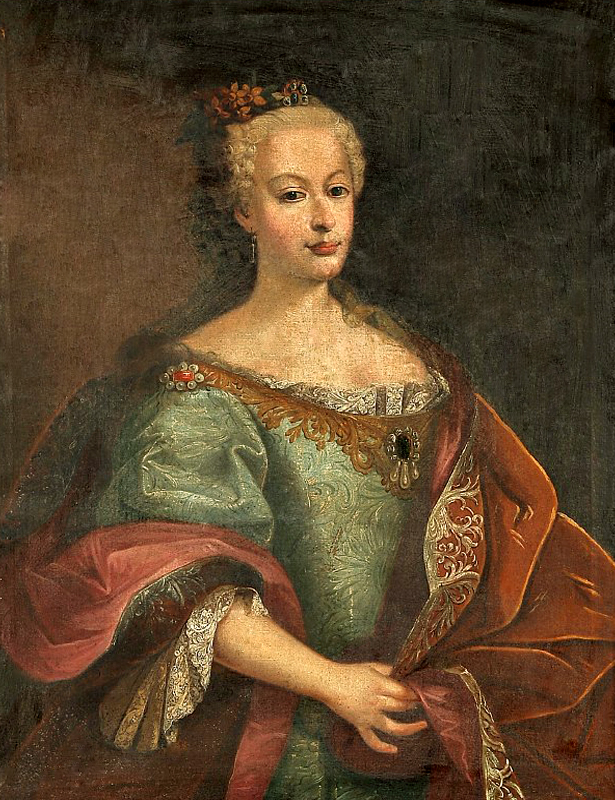
Infanta Francisca Josefa of Portugal born 30 January

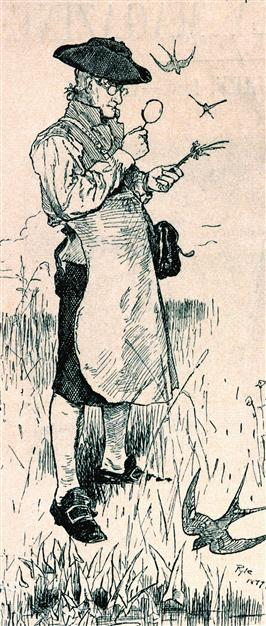
John Bartram born 23 March

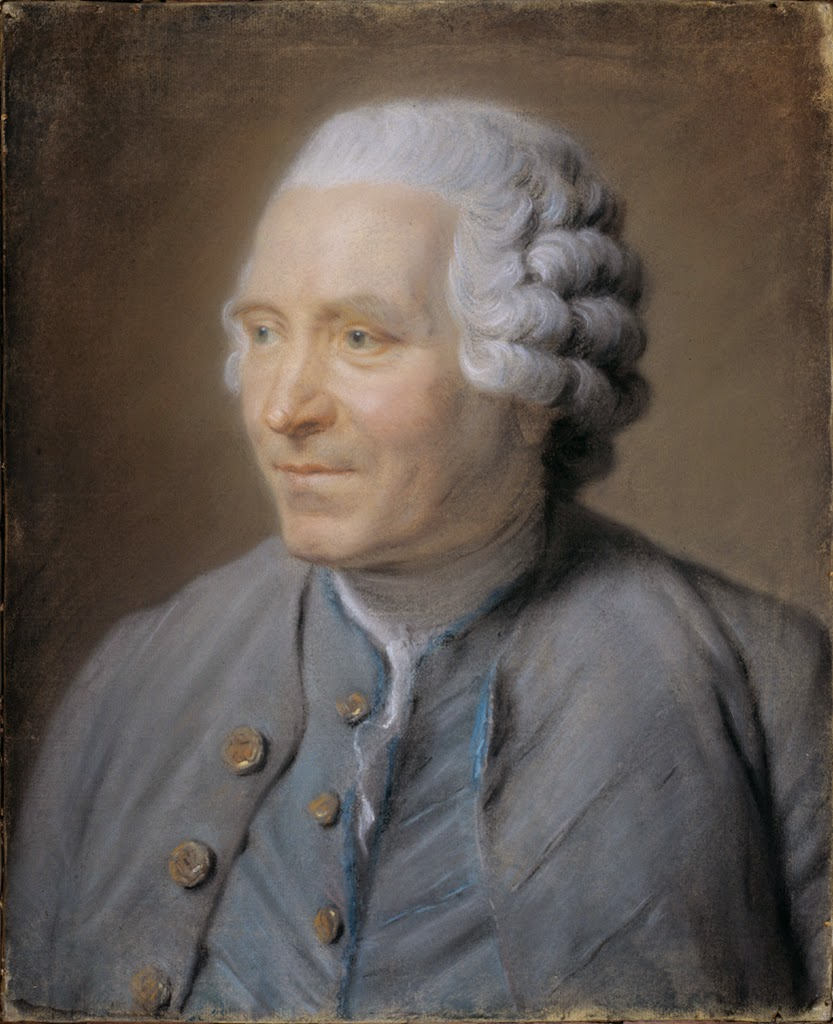
Hubert-François Gravelot born 26 March

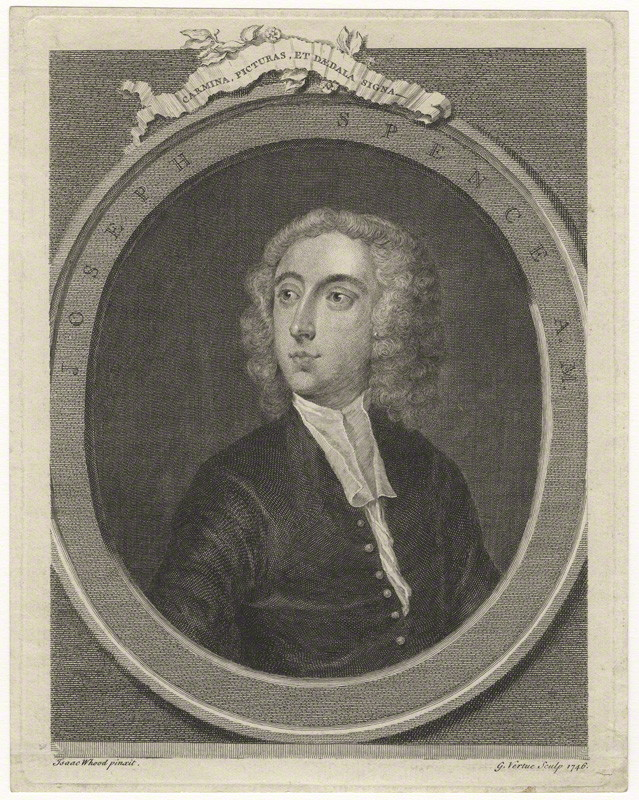
Joseph Spence (author) born 28 April

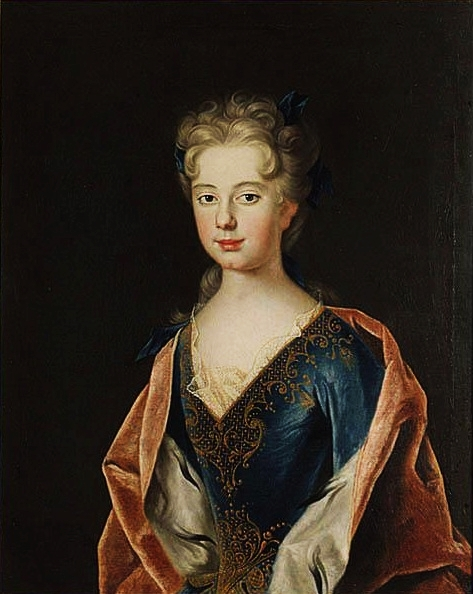
Anna Leszczyńska (1699–1717) born 25 May

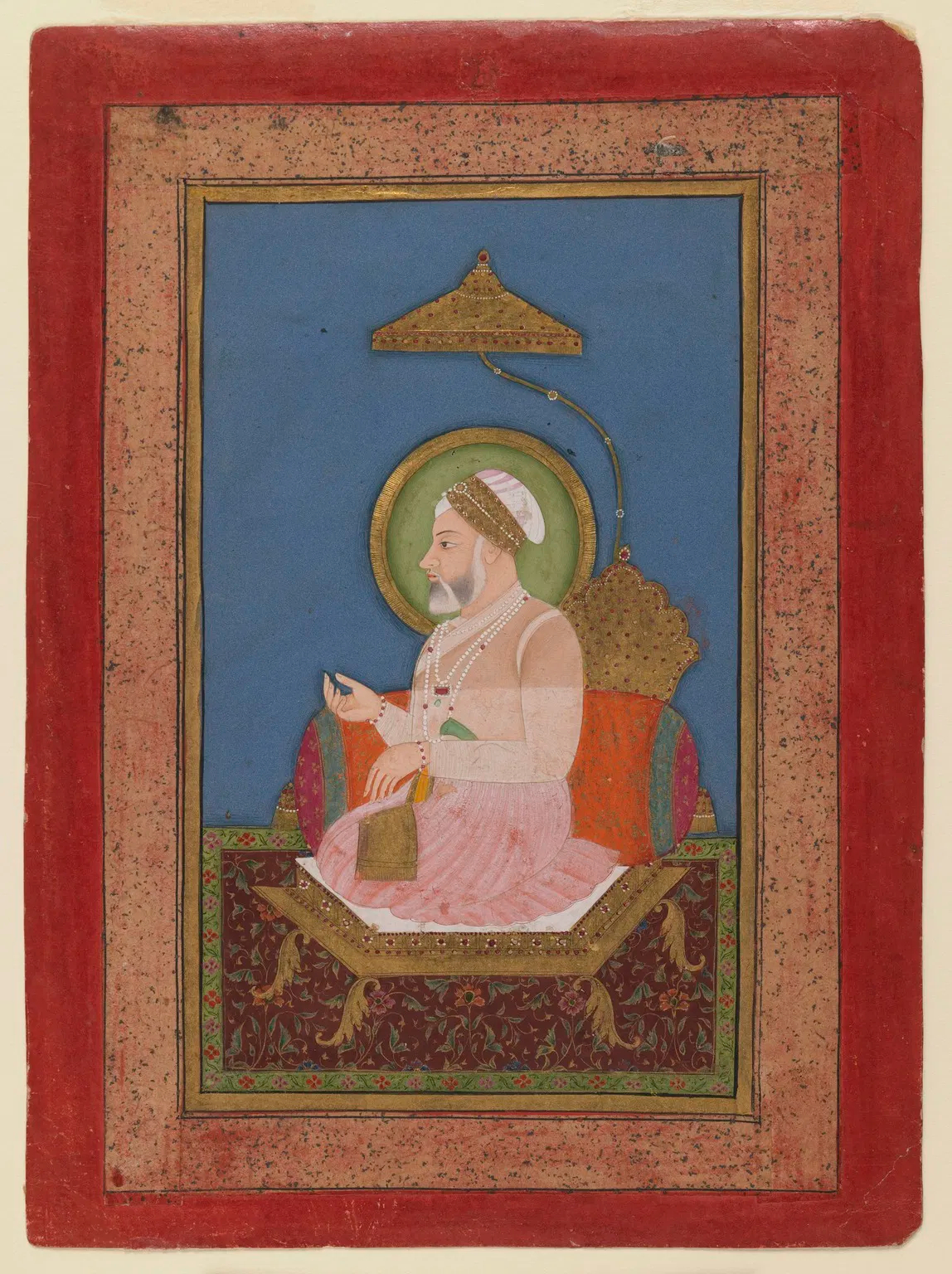
Alamgir II born 6 June

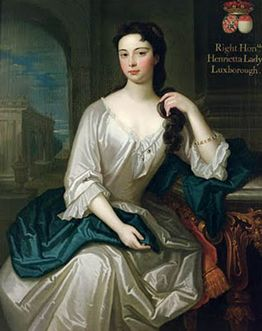
Henrietta Knight, Lady Luxborough born 15 July

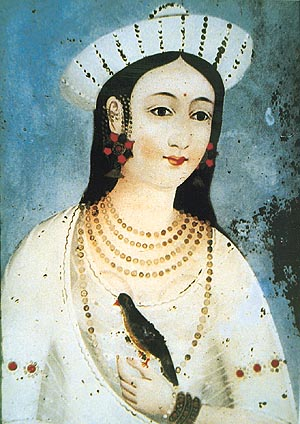
Mastani born 29 August

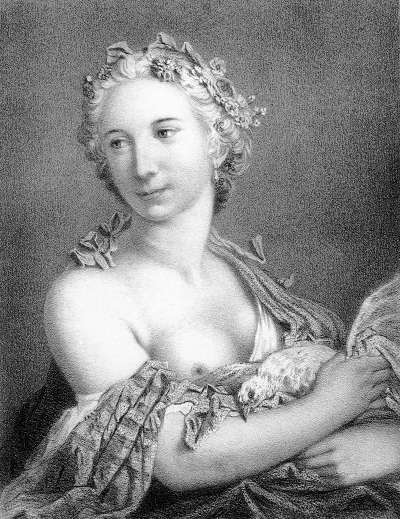
Jeanne Quinault born 13 October

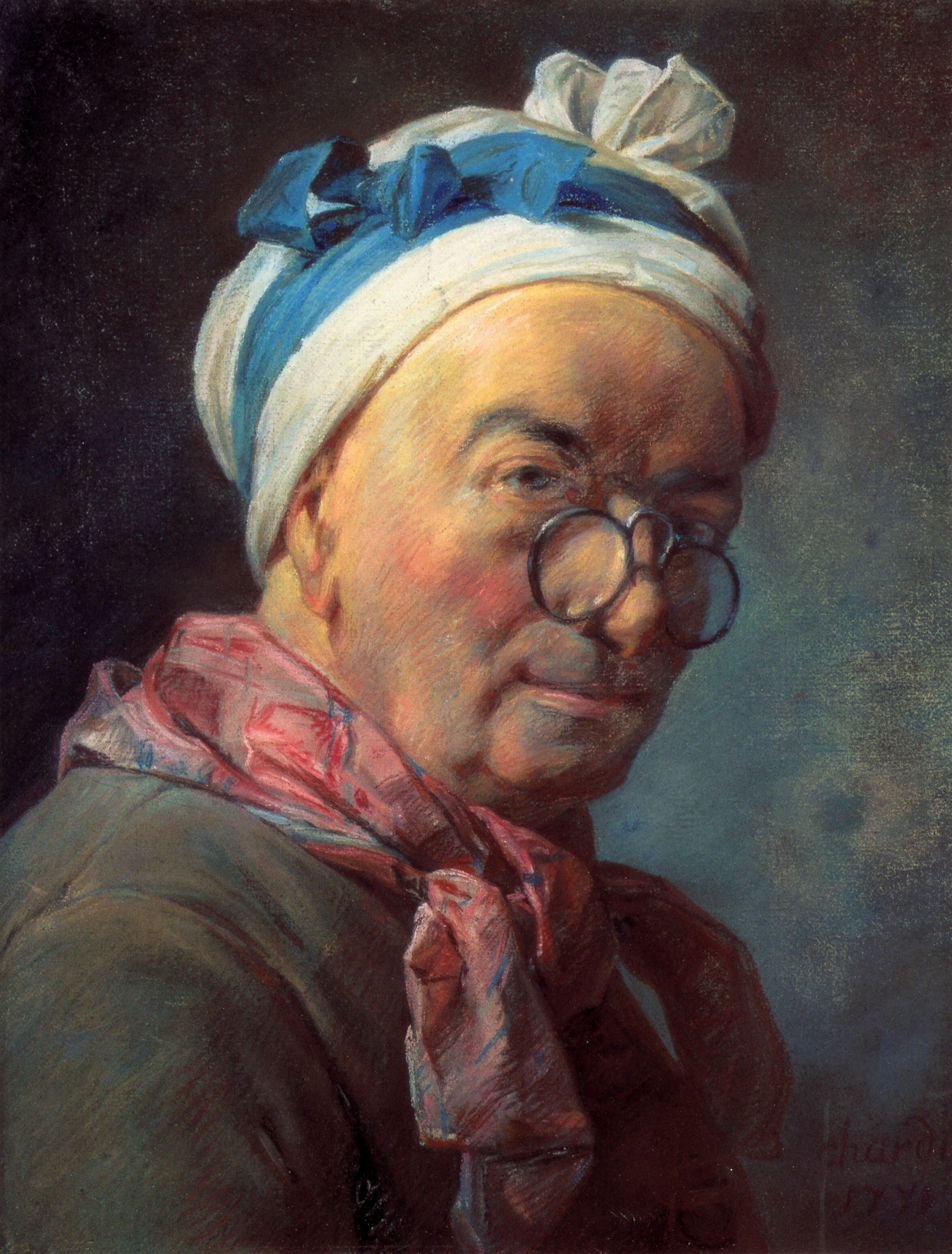
Jean-Baptiste-Siméon Chardin born 2 November

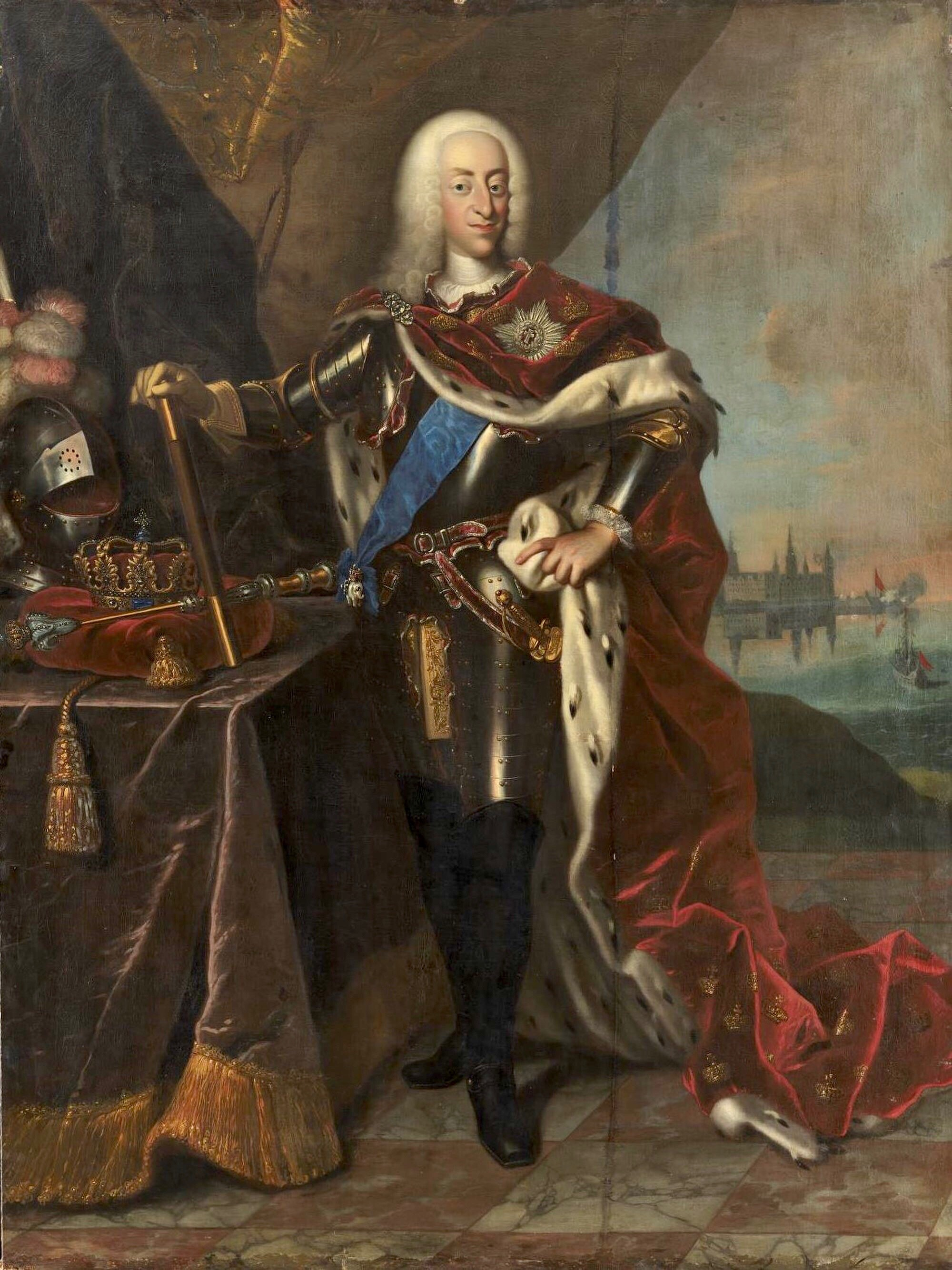
Christian VI, King of Denmark, born 30 November

=== January–March ===
- January 2 – FitzRoy Henry Lee, British officer of the Royal Navy, Commodore Governor of the Colony of Newfoundland (d. 1750)
- January 9
  - Christian Tobias Damm, renowned German Classical philologist (d. 1778)
  - Robert Joseph Pothier, French jurist (d. 1772)
- January 11 – Friedrich Wilhelm Quirin von Forcade de Biaix, Royal Prussian Lieutenant General (d. 1765)
- January 14 – Jakob Adlung, German organist, teacher, instrument maker, music historian, composer and music theorist (d. 1762)
- January 16 – Franz Christoph Anton, Count of Hohenzollern-Sigmaringen, member of the House of Hohenzollern (d. 1767)
- January 20 – Thomas Hervey, politician (d. 1775)
- January 30 – Infanta Francisca Josefa of Portugal, Portuguese princess, the last of eight children of King Peter II of Portugal (d. 1736)
- January 31 – Mathias Haydn, father of two famous composers (d. 1763)
- February 2 – Hugh MacDonald, Roman Catholic bishop, Vicar Apostolic of the Highland District of Scotland 1731–1773 (d. 1773)
- February 9 – Étienne Jeaurat, French painter (d. 1789)
- February 10 – George Bowman, 18th-century American pioneer (d. 1768)
- February 11
  - Bertrand-François Mahé de La Bourdonnais, French naval officer and colonial administrator (d. 1753)
  - Samuel Heathcote, British politician who sat in the House of Commons from 1740 to 1747 (d. 1775)
- February 14 – Odet-Joseph Giry, French clergyman (d. 1761)
- February 15 – Giovanni Maria Morlaiter, Italian sculptor of the Rococo or late-Baroque (d. 1782)
- February 17 – Georg Wenzeslaus von Knobelsdorff, painter and architect in Prussia (d. 1753)
- February 24 – Giuseppe Pascaletti, Italian painter (d. 1757)
- March 3 – Georg Detlev von Flemming, General in Polish-Saxon service (d. 1771)
- March 7 – António Nunes Ribeiro Sanches, 18th-century Portuguese physician (d. 1783)
- March 8 – Johan Friederich Wewer, Danish merchant and ship-owner (d. 1759)
- March 13 – Jacob Faggot, Swedish scientist, civil servant and surveyor (d. 1777)
- March 17
  - Radu Cantacuzino, 18th-century Romanian prince (d. 1761)
  - Charles O'Brien, 6th Viscount Clare, Irish military officer in French service (d. 1761)
- March 23 – John Bartram, American botanist (d. 1777)
- March 24
  - David Renaud Boullier, Dutch Huguenot theologian (d. 1759)
  - Paul Gottlieb Werlhof, German physician and poet who was a native of Helmstedt (d. 1767)
- March 25
  - James Calthorpe, Yeoman of the Removing Wardrobe (d. 1784)
  - Johann Adolph Hasse, German composer (d. 1783)
- March 26 – Hubert-François Gravelot, French engraver (d. 1773)
- March 30 – Edward Stradling, Welsh politician (d. 1726)
- March 31 – Françoise-Louise de Warens, benefactress and mistress of Jean-Jacques Rousseau (d. 1762)

=== April–June ===
- April 3 – Jean-Baptiste Forqueray, player of the viol and a composer (d. 1782)
- April 10 – Catharina Sperling-Heckel, German miniature painter (d. 1741)
- April 13 – Alexander Ross, Scottish poet (d. 1784)
- April 14 – Frederick III, Duke of Saxe-Gotha-Altenburg (d. 1772)
- April 17 – Robert Blair, Scottish poet and cleric (d. 1746)
- April 19 – Valentin Metzinger, French-born Austrian-Slovenian painter (d. 1759)
- April 20 – Sir Thomas Lowther, 2nd Baronet, English landowner (d. 1745)
- April 25 – Johann Gottlieb Siegel, German legal scholar (d. 1755)
- April 27
  - Thomas Belasyse, 1st Earl Fauconberg, British peer (d. 1774)
  - Jacopo Stellini, Italian abbot (d. 1770)
  - Albert Wolfgang, Count of Schaumburg-Lippe, ruler of the County of Schaumburg-Lippe (d. 1748)
- April 28 – Joseph Spence, historian (d. 1768)
- May 2 – Daniel Betts Jr., member of the Connecticut House of Representatives from Norwalk (d. 1783)
- May 13 – Marquis of Pombal, Prime Minister of Portugal (d. 1782)
- May 14
  - Ryk Tulbagh, Governor of the Dutch Cape Colony (d. 1771)
  - Hans Joachim von Zieten, Prussian field marshal (d. 1786)
- May 15 – Sampson Lloyd, English iron manufacturer and banker, who co-founded Lloyds Bank (d. 1779)
- May 23 – William Parks, 18th-century printer and journalist in England and Colonial America (d. 1750)
- May 24 – Adam Ignacy Komorowski, Polish Roman Catholic archbishop (d. 1759)
- May 25
  - Pattee Byng, 2nd Viscount Torrington, British Army officer and politician (d. 1747)
  - Anna Leszczyńska, eldest child of Stanisław Leszczyński and Catherine Opalińska (d. 1717)
- May 26 – Nikita Trubetskoy, Russian statesman, Field Marshal, minister of defense of Russia (d. 1767)
- May 28 – Laurent Cars, French designer and engraver (d. 1771)
- May 29 – Pierre Rémond de Sainte-Albine, 18th-century French historian and playwright (d. 1778)
- May 31 – Alexander Cruden, Scottish author of an early concordance to the Bible (d. 1770)
- June 4 – William Moore, Banbury MP (d. 1746)
- June 6
  - Johann Georg Estor, German theorist of public law (d. 1773)
  - Alamgir II, the fifteenth Mughal Emperor of India (d. 1759)
- June 17 – François-Alexandre Aubert de La Chesnaye Des Bois, French writer, genealogist and compiler (d. 1784)
- June 20 – William Gustav of Anhalt-Dessau, German prince of the House of Ascania, heir to the principality of Anhalt-Dessau (d. 1737)
- June 26 – Marie Thérèse Rodet Geoffrin, French salon holder (d. 1777)

=== July–September ===
- July 14
  - Vere Beauclerk, 1st Baron Vere, Royal Navy officer, British peer and MP (d. 1781)
  - Philipp Ludwig von Sinzendorf, Austrian cardinal of the Catholic Church (d. 1747)
- July 15
  - Richard Crowle, Yorkshire lawyer and a Member of Parliament for Kingston upon Hull (d. 1757)
  - Henrietta Knight, Lady Luxborough, English poet and letter writer, now mainly remembered as a gardener (d. 1756)
- July 18 – Barthélemy Hus-Desforges, 18th-century French comedian and troupe leader (d. 1786)
- July 21 – Heinrich XXIX, Count of Reuss-Ebersdorf, member of the House of Reuss Younger Line, Count Ebersdorf from 1711 until his death (d. 1747)
- July 25 – Charles Beckingham, English poet and dramatist (d. 1731)
- July 28
  - John Coutts, British merchant and banker who became Lord Provost of Edinburgh in 1742 (d. 1750)
  - Princess Amalia d'Este (d. 1778)
- August 5 – Ferdinand Maria Innocenz of Bavaria, Bavarian prince and an Imperial Field marshal (d. 1738)
- August 10 – Christoph Gottlieb Schröter, German composer and organist (d. 1782)
- August 25 – Charles Étienne Louis Camus, French mathematician and mechanician born at Crécy-en-Brie (d. 1768)
- August 29 – Mastani, daughter of Chhatrasal and Ruhani Bai Begum (d. 1740)
- August 30 – James Wemyss, 5th Earl of Wemyss, son of David Wemyss (d. 1756)
- September 1 – George Benson, English Presbyterian pastor and theologian (d. 1762)
- September 2 – Elizabeth Younger, actress and dancer (d. 1762)
- September 11 – Anna Maria of Liechtenstein, princess consort of Liechtenstein (d. 1753)
- September 12 – John Martyn, English botanist (d. 1768)
- September 28 – Johann Friedrich Ruhe, German composer (d. 1776)
- September 29 – Charles Calvert, 5th Baron Baltimore, British nobleman and Proprietary Governor of the Province of Maryland (d. 1751)

=== October–December ===
- October 2 – Ferdinande Henriette, Countess of Stolberg-Gedern (d. 1750)
- October 4 – Vieira Lusitano, Portuguese court painter (d. 1783)
- October 10 – William Prentis, merchant in Williamsburg, Virginia (d. 1765)
- October 13 – Jeanne Quinault, French actress and playwright (d. 1783)
- October 21 – Hans Christoph Friedrich Graf von Hacke, Prussian General and Commandant of Berlin (d. 1754)
- October 23 – John Verney, British barrister, judge, Tory and then Whig politician and MP (d. 1741)
- October 27 – Thomas Fonnereau, British merchant and politician (d. 1779)
- November 2 – Jean-Baptiste-Siméon Chardin, French painter (d. 1779)
- November 5 – Merrik Burrell, British politician (d. 1787)
- November 8 – Sir Erasmus Philipps, 5th Baronet (d. 1743)
- November 9 – Sir Robert Kemp, 4th Baronet, British landowner, Tory politician and MP (d. 1752)
- November 11
  - Ferdinando Fuga, Italian architect (d. 1782)
  - Sulaiman Badrul Alam Shah of Johor, 12th Sultan and Yang di-Pertuan Besar of Johor and Pahang and their dependencies who reigned from 1722 to 1760 (d. 1760)
  - Natalia Lopukhina, Russian noble (d. 1763)
- November 18 – Gerrit Braamcamp, successful Roman Catholic distiller (d. 1771)
- November 20 – Antun Kanižlić, Croatian Jesuit and poet (d. 1777)
- November 22 – François de Chennevières, French poet and librettist (d. 1779)
- November 25 – Pierre Subleyras, French painter (d. 1749)
- November 30 – King Christian VI of Denmark (d. 1746)
- December 2 – John White, English politician who sat in the House of Commons (d. 1769)
- December 11 – Sarah Chapone, English legal theorist, pamphleteer, and prolific letter writer (d. 1764)
- December 17 – Charles-Louis Mion, French composer (d. 1775)
- December 19 – William Bowyer, English printer (d. 1777)
- December 29 – Friedrich Ludwig Abresch, Dutch philologist of German origins (d. 1782)

== Deaths ==
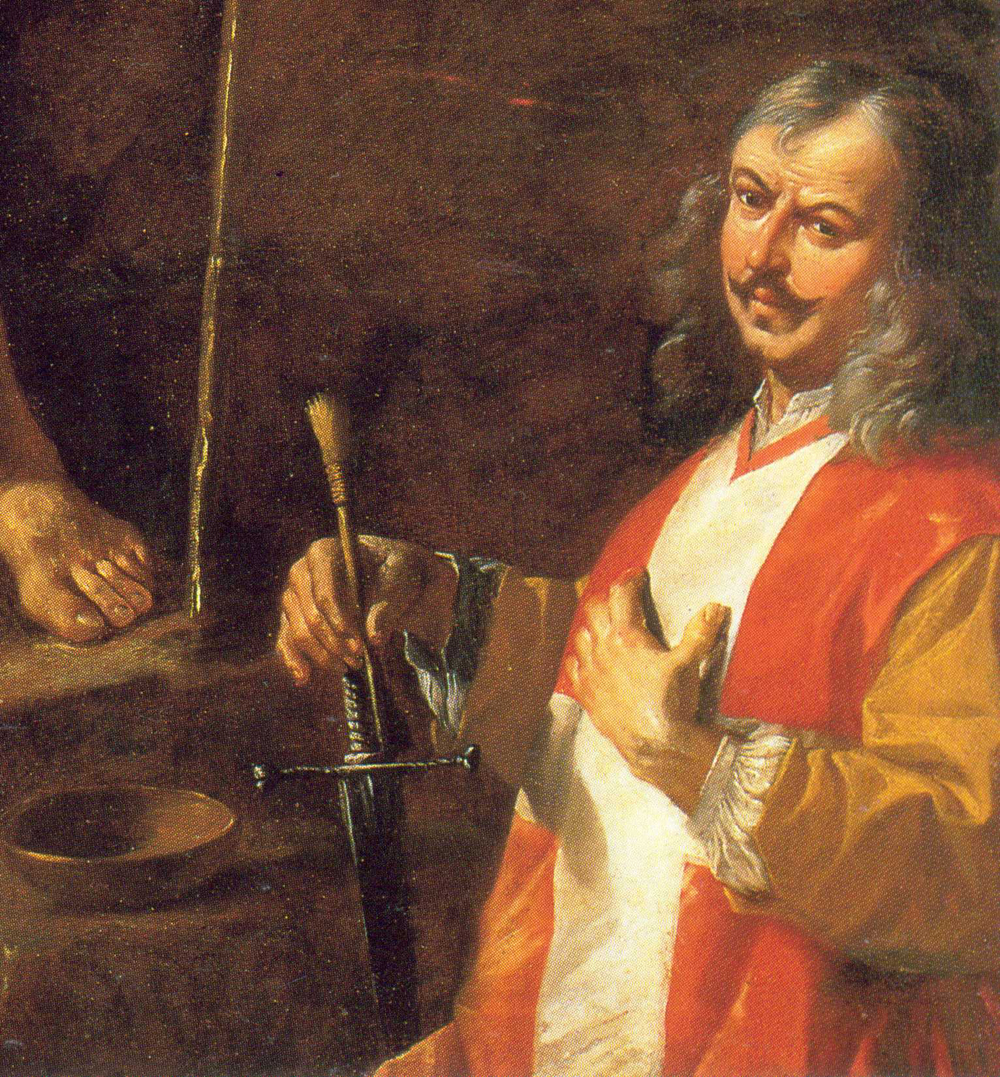
Mattia Preti died 3 January

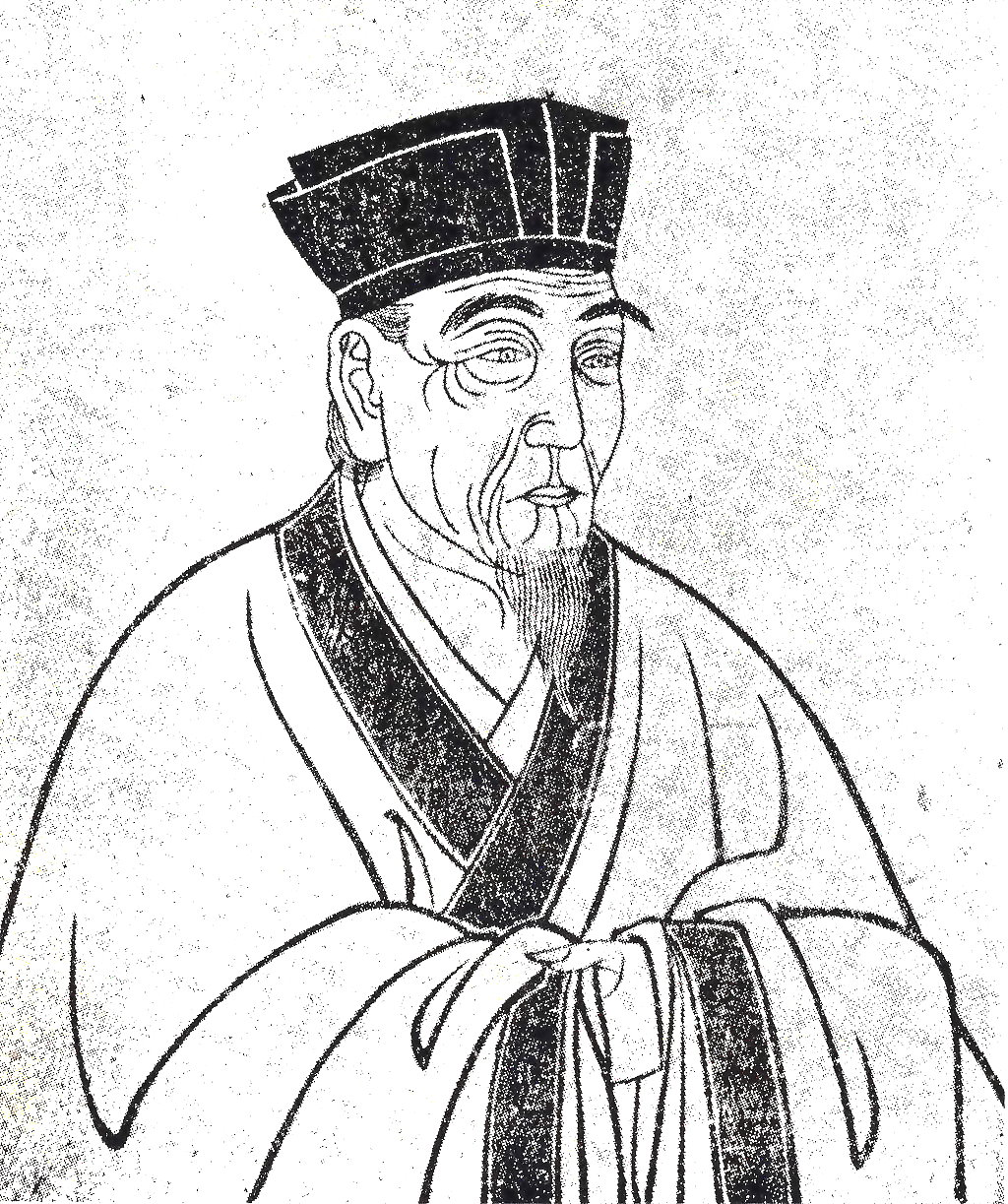
Kinoshita Jun'an died 23 January

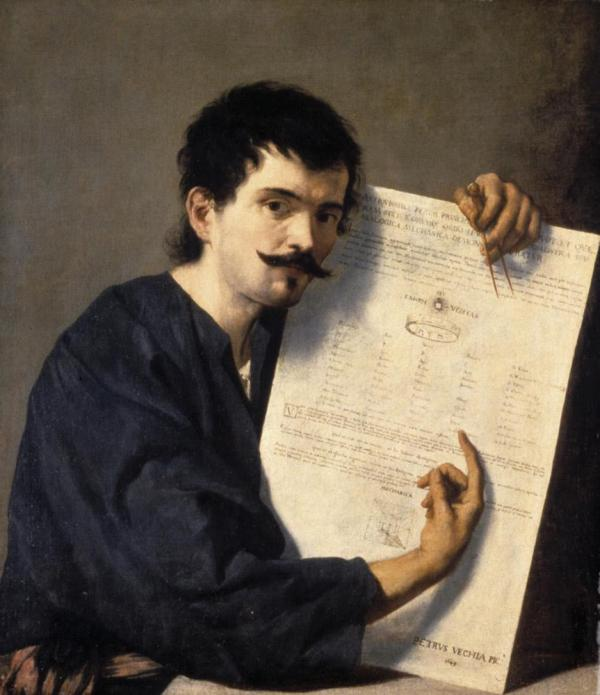
Erhard Weigel died 20 March

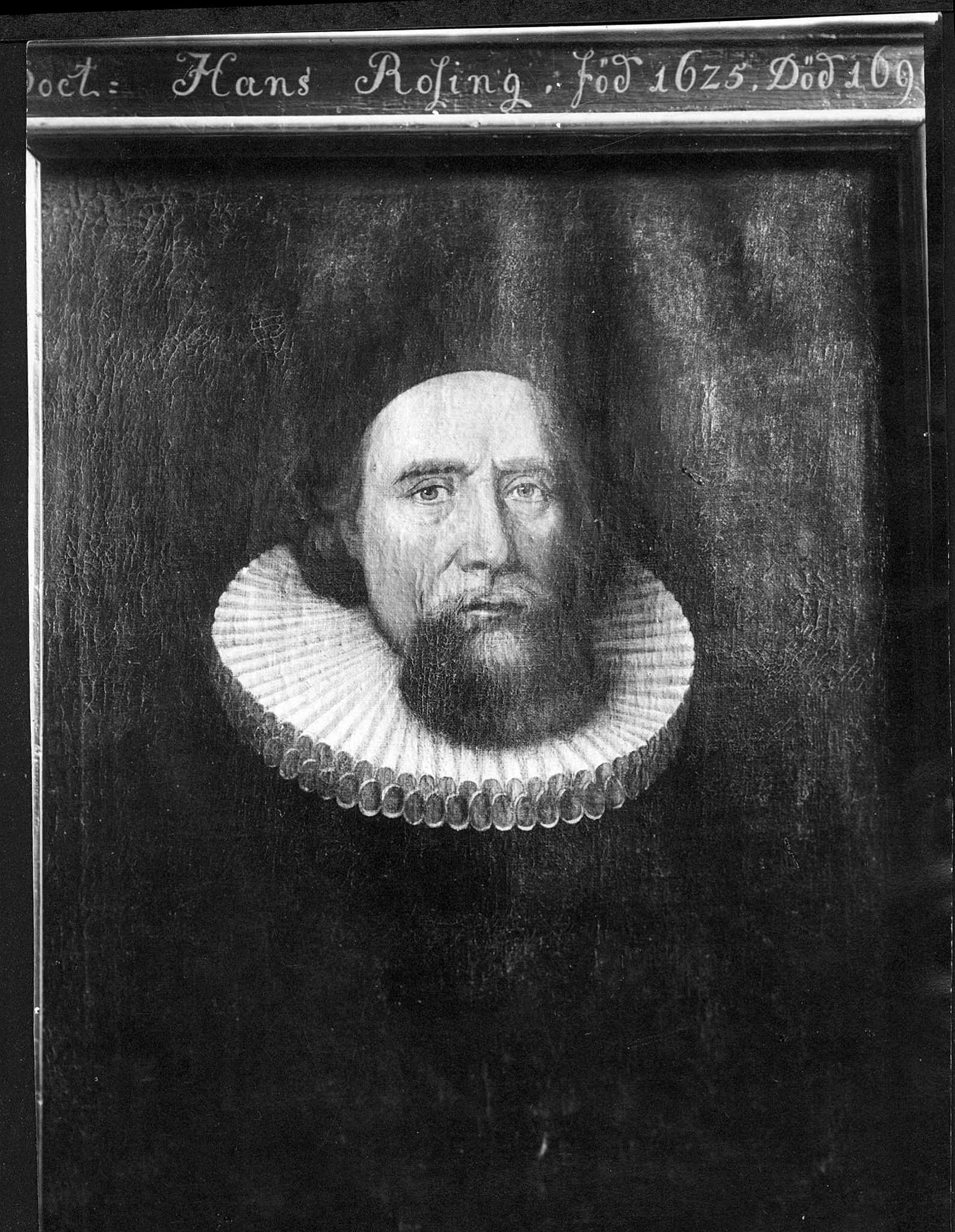
Hans Rosing died 13 April

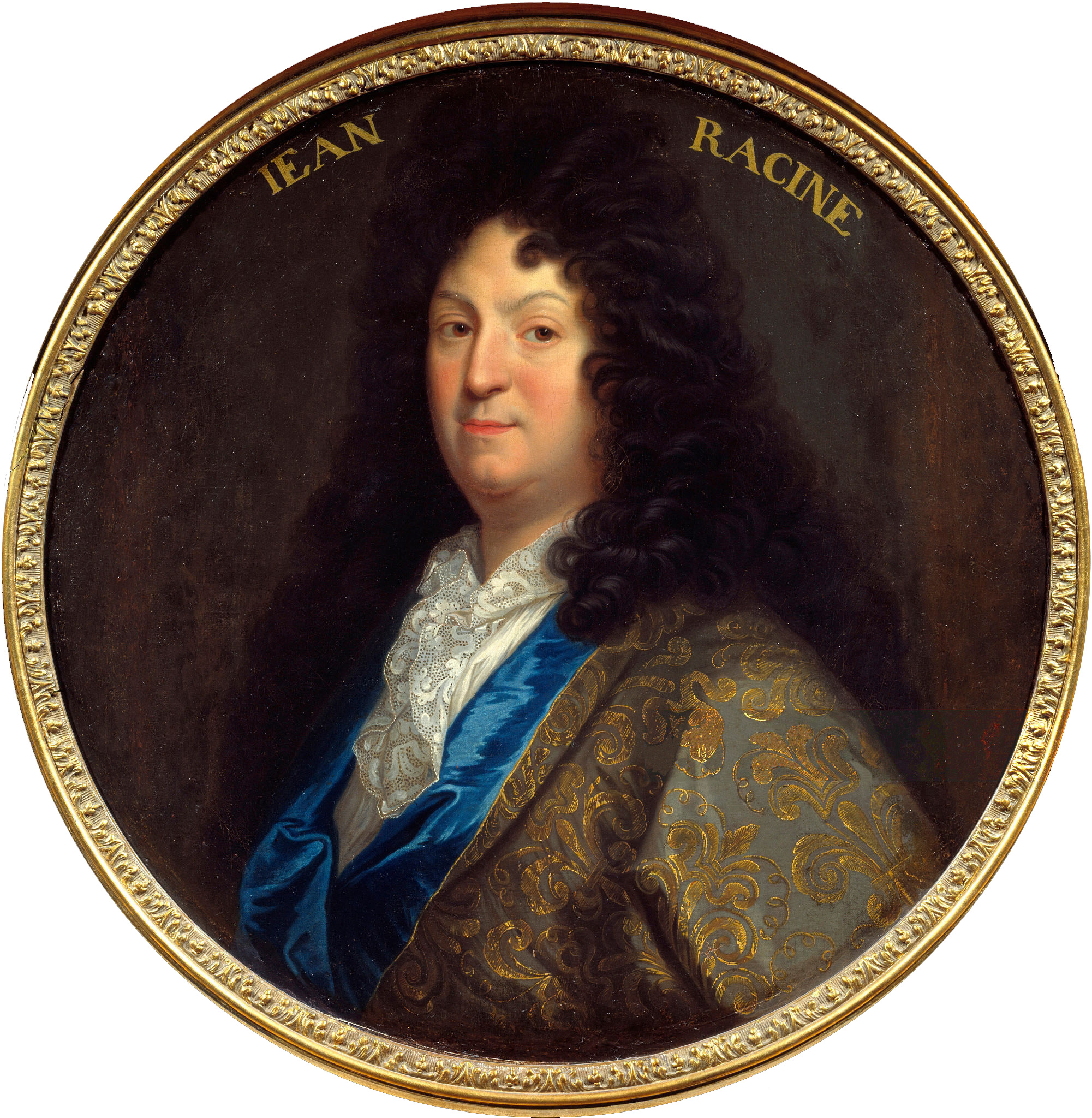
Jean Racine died 21 April

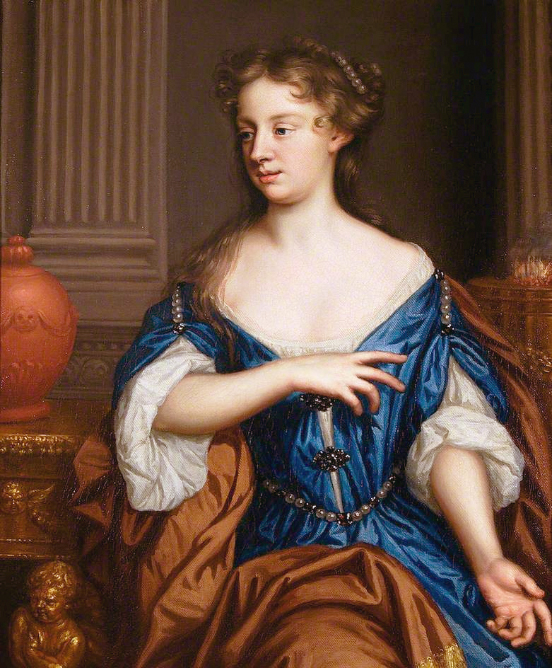
Mary Beale died 8 October

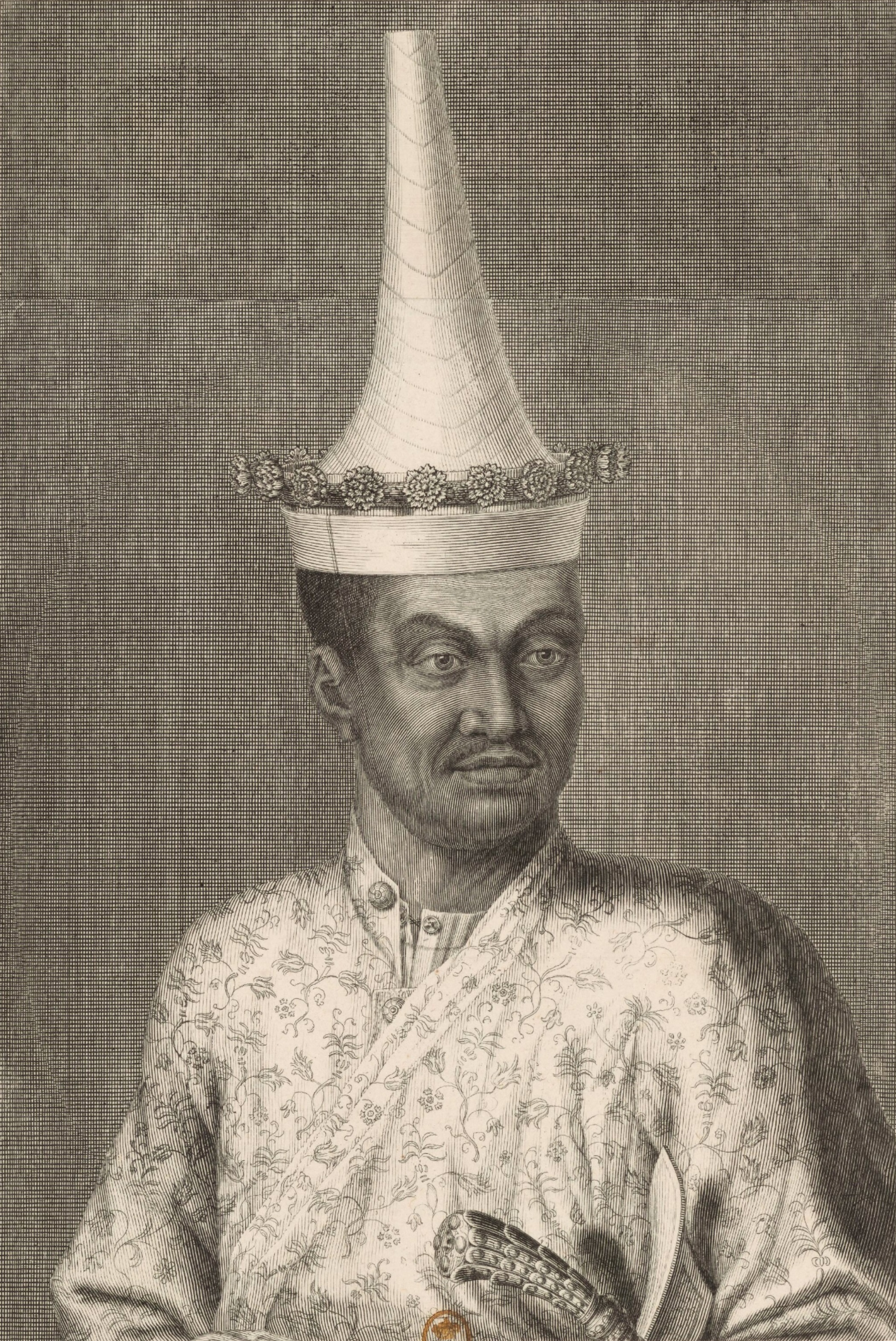
Kosa Pan died 15 November

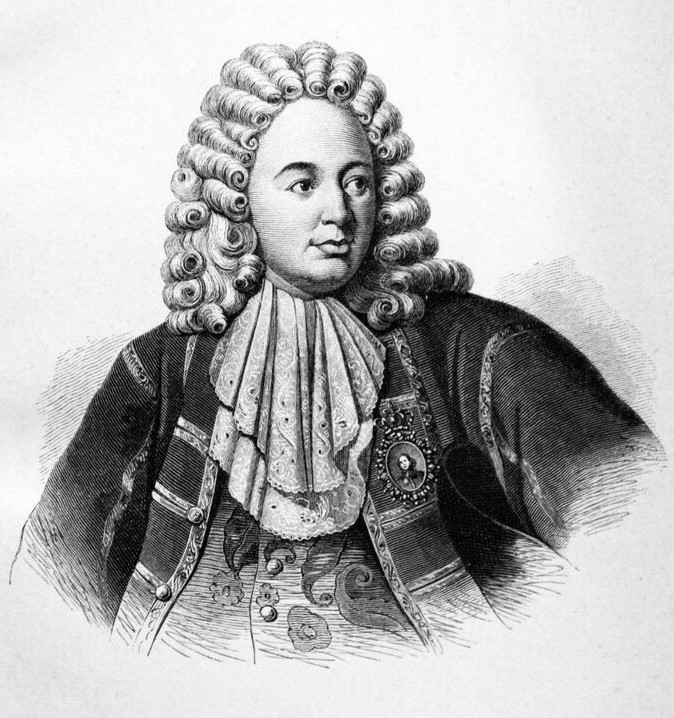
Patrick Gordon died 29 November

=== January–March ===
- January 3 – Mattia Preti, Italian Baroque artist who worked in Italy and Malta (b. 1613)
- January 14 – Federico Caccia, Cardinal Archbishop of Milan (b. 1635)
- January 21 – Obadiah Walker, English writer (b. 1616)
- January 23 – Kinoshita Jun'an, Japanese philosopher and Confucian scholar (b. 1621)
- January 27 – Sir William Temple, 1st Baronet, English statesman and essayist (b. 1628)
- February 1
  - Thomas Chicheley, English politician (b. 1614)
  - Manuel Fernández de Santa Cruz, Spanish religious writer, Catholic prelate and bishop (b. 1637)
  - Countess Charlotte Johanna of Waldeck-Wildungen, daughter of Count Josias II (b. 1664)
- February 6 – Joseph Ferdinand of Bavaria, son of Maximilian II Emanuel (b. 1692)
- February 18 – Giovanni Giacomo Cavallerini, Roman Catholic cardinal (b. 1639)
- February 20 – Jean-Baptiste Monnoyer, Franco-Flemish painter who specialised in flower pieces (b. 1636)
- February 25 – Lambert Darchis, arts patron from Liège (b. 1625)
- March 12
  - Peder Griffenfeld, Danish statesman (b. 1635)
  - Matsudaira Tsunamasa (b. 1661)
- March 17 – Serafina of God, founder of seven Carmelite monasteries of nuns in southern Italy (b. 1621)
- March 20
  - Charles Montecatini, Roman Catholic prelate who served as Titular Archbishop of Chalcedon (1690–1699) (b. 1615)
  - Erhard Weigel, German mathematician, astronomer and philosopher (b. 1625)
- March 22 – William Chaloner (b. 1650)
- March 27 – Edward Stillingfleet, British theologian and scholar (b. 1635)

=== April–June ===
- April 1 – Peter Pett, English lawyer and author (b. 1630)
- April 7 – Simon Ford, English divine (b. 1619)
- April 13 – Hans Rosing, Norwegian clergyman (b. 1625)
- April 19 – Jacques-Nompar II de Caumont, duc de La Force, French nobleman and peer (b. 1632)
- April 21 – Jean Racine, French classic dramatist (b. 1639)
- April 22
  - Hans Erasmus Aßmann, Freiherr von Abschatz, German statesman and poet (b. 1646)
  - François-Marie Renaud d'Avène des Meloizes (b. 1655)
- May 12 – Lucas Achtschellinck, Flemish painter (b. 1626)
- May 15 – Sir Edward Petre, 3rd Baronet, English Jesuit, privy councillor (b. 1631)
- May 16 – Christine Charlotte of Württemberg, princess consort of East Frisia by marriage to George Christian (b. 1645)
- May 22 – James Bertie, 1st Earl of Abingdon, English nobleman (b. 1653)
- May 25 – Bussy Mansell, Welsh Member of the English Parliament (b. 1623)
- June 1 – George II, Duke of Württemberg-Montbéliard, (1662–1699) (b. 1626)
- June 2 – Henry Frederick, Count of Hohenlohe-Langenburg, youngest child of Count Philip Ernest (b. 1625)
- June 13 – Juan Tomás de Rocaberti, Catalan theologian (b. 1627)
- June 16 – Constantin Marselis, Danish baron (b. 1647)
- June 22
  - Josiah Child, English Governor of the East India Company (b. 1630)
  - Fernando de Meneses, 2nd Count of Ericeira, Portuguese nobleman and military man (b. 1614)

=== July–September ===
- July 1
  - Lodewijck Huygens, Dutch diplomat (b. 1631)
  - Tokugawa Tsunanari, Japanese daimyō (b. 1652)
- July 2 – Hortense Mancini, favourite Italian niece of Cardinal Mazarin (b. 1646)
- July 3 – Johann Just Winckelmann, German writer and historian (b. 1620)
- July 10 – Pier Martire Armani, Italian painter (b. 1613)
- July 19 – Giovanni Delfino, cardinal (b. 1617)
- August 4 – Maria Sophia of Neuburg, Queen consort of Portugal (b. 1666)
- August 6 – Albert V, Duke of Saxe-Coburg, duke of Saxe-Coburg (b. 1648)
- August 11 – Friedrich von Canitz, German poet and diplomat (b. 1654)
- August 13 – Marco d'Aviano, Italian Capuchin friar (b. 1631)
- August 19 – José Saenz d'Aguirre, Spanish Catholic cardinal (b. 1630)
- August 24 – Lucrezia Barberini, Italian noblewoman and (b. 1628)
- August 25 – Christian V of Denmark, King of Denmark and Norway (b. 1646)
- August 28 – Joseph Barret, English businessman and theological writer (b. 1665)
- September 8 – Gottfried Wilhelm Sacer, German jurist (b. 1635)
- September 13 – James Fraser of Brea, Covenanter (b. 1639)
- September 17 – Augustus, Duke of Schleswig-Holstein-Sonderburg-Plön-Norburg (b. 1635)
- September 26 – Simon Arnauld de Pomponne, French diplomat and minister (b. 1618)

=== October–December ===
- October 3 – Edward Ayscough, English politician (b. 1650)
- October 4 – George Evelyn, English politician (b. 1617)
- October 8 – Mary Beale, English portrait painter (b. 1633)
- November 2 – Anthony Ashley-Cooper, 2nd Earl of Shaftesbury, English politician (b. 1652)
- November 15 – Kosa Pan, Siamese diplomat and minister who led the second Siamese embassy to France sent by King Narai in 1686 (b. 1633)
- November 23 – Joseph Beaumont, British academic and poet (b. 1616)
- November 28 – Mary Allerton, Dutch settler of Plymouth Colony in what is now Massachusetts (b. 1616)
- November 29 – Patrick Gordon, general and rear admiral in Russia (b. 1635)
- December 7 – Sigmund von Erlach, Swiss politician (b. 1614)
- December 17 – John Francis Desideratus, Prince of Nassau-Siegen, (1652–1699) (b. 1627)
- December 22 – Michelangelo Mattei, Roman Catholic prelate, Titular Patriarch of Antioch, Titular Archbishop of Hadrianopolis in Haemimonto (b. 1628)
- December 31 – Giulio Dalla Rosa, Roman Catholic prelate who served as Bishop of Borgo San Donnino (1698–1699) (b. 1642)

=== Date unknown ===
- Henry Every, English pirate (b. 1659)
