= Mademoiselle Duclos =

17th-century French theater actress

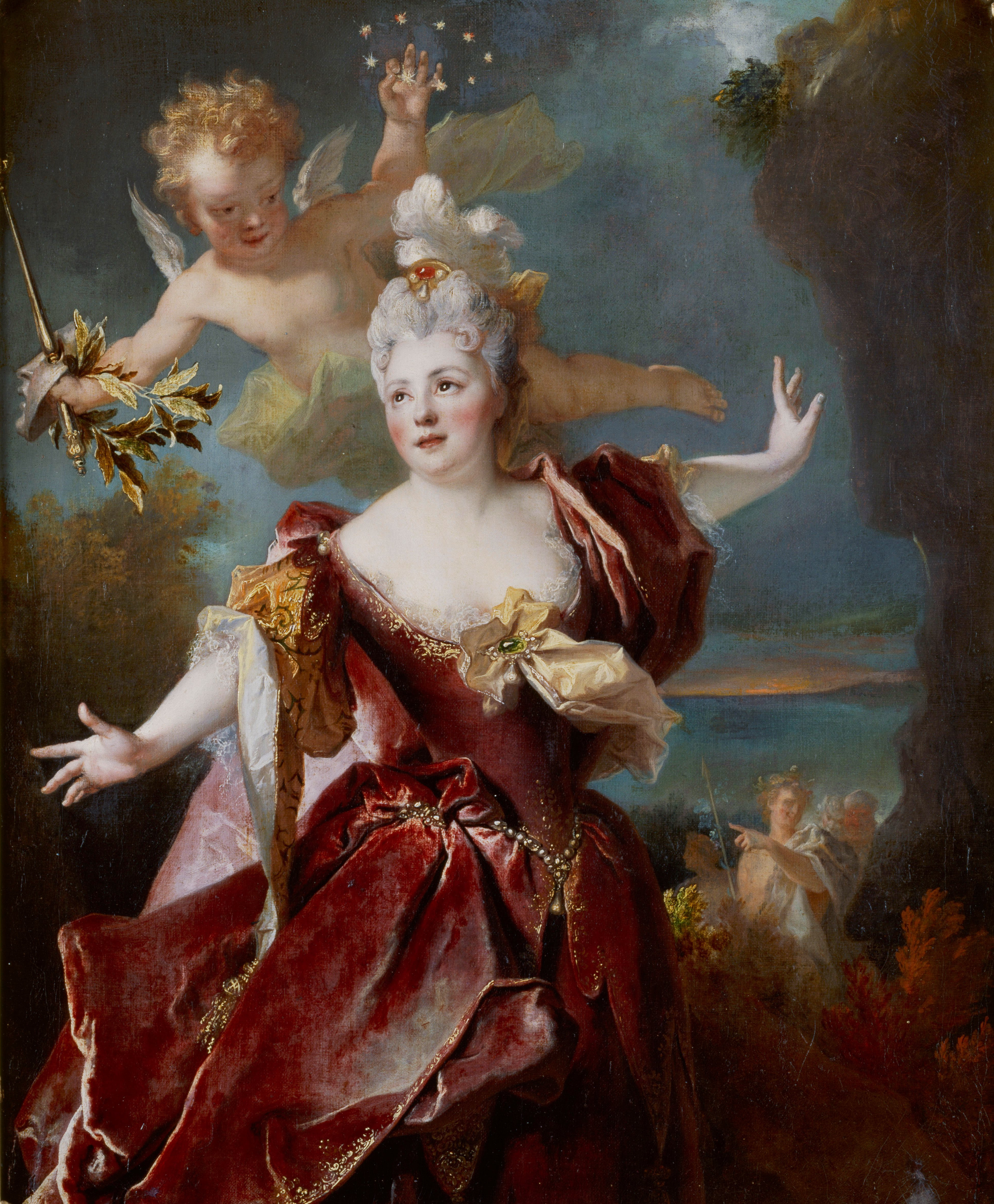
- Portrait of Marie-Anne de Châteauneuf by Nicolas de Largillière
- Born: Marie-Anne de Châteauneuf c. 1668; France
- Died: 1748; France
- Occupation: Actress
- Years active: 1693–1733
- Spouse: Duchemin fils (?–1730)
- Children

Marie-Anne de Châteauneuf (c. 1668–1748), known as Mademoiselle Duclos, was a French stage actress. She had a long career at the Comédie-Française and played leading roles in tragedies by Racine and other major playwrights of her era. One of the most famous actresses of the Comédie Française in Paris, her declamatory acting style drew increasing criticism over time for its artificiality.

== Early life and career ==
She came from a family of actors – her grandfather, whose name she took, was at the Théâtre du Marais – she debuted without much success at the Opéra-Comique. She was born in Paris to Auguste-Pierre Patissier de Chateauneuf (known as Chateauneuf), and Catherine du Ruffin.

=== Stage career ===
Duclos made her debut on the Paris stage at the Opera, achieving only moderate success. She then studied at the Comédie-Française, first appearing there on October 27, 1693, in the role of Justine in the tragedy Géta by Nicolas de Péchantré. She became a full member of the company in 1694. From 1696 onward, she took over leading tragic roles from the actress Champmeslé.

Over her long career, Duclos created and performed roles including:

- Axiane in Racine's Alexander the Great (1704)
- Esther in Racine's Esther (1721)
- Hersilie in Romulus by Houdar de La Motte (1722)
- Inês de Castro in Inès de Castro by Houdar de La Motte (1723)
- Salomé in Voltaire's Mariamne (1724)
- Mariamne in Mariamne by Abbé Nadal (1725)
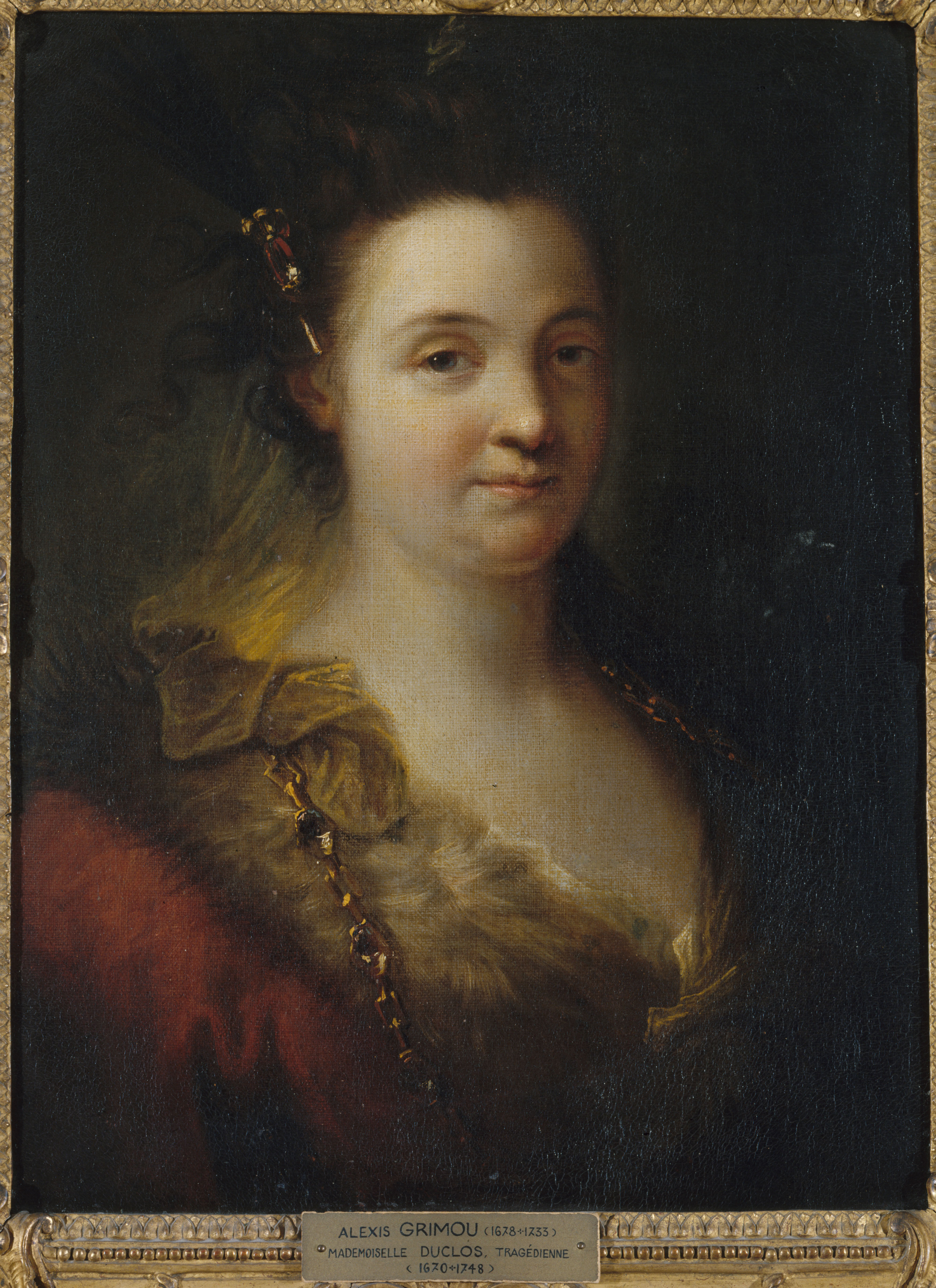
- Portrait of Mademoiselle Duclos (Marie-Anne de Châteauneuf)
  Jocasta in Oedipus by Houdar de La Motte (1726)

== Houdar de La Motte's Ode ==
The playwright Houdar de la Motte composed a laudatory ode to Duclos entitled La Déclamation. Three stanzas of this poem are cited under her portrait as Ariadne in a 1714 engraving by Louis Desplaces, after Nicolas de Largillière's painting.

Qui mieux que toi, Duclos, actrice inimitable,
De cet art connut les beautés ?
Qui sut donner un art plus véritable
À des mouvements imités ?
Ah ! que j'aime à te voir en Amante abusée,
Le visage noyé de pleurs,
Hors l'inflexible cœur du parjure Thésée
Toucher, emporter tous les cœurs.

De tous nos mouvements es-tu donc la maîtresse
Tiens-tu notre cœur dans ta main,
Tu feins le désespoir, la haine, la tendresse,
Et je sens tout ce que tu feins

(Who better than you, Duclos, inimitable actress,
Knew the beauties of this art?
Who gave a truer art?
To imitated movements?
Of all our movements are you then the mistress
Do you hold our heart in your hand,
You feign despair, hatred, tenderness,
And I feel everything you feign)

— Houdar de La Motte

== Critical reception ==
While admired early on, Duclos' declamatory and artificial acting style increasingly drew criticism in the early 18th century as performers like Adrienne Lecouvreur pioneered a more naturalistic approach. Her critics included playwrights like Jean Dumas d'Aigueberre, Lesage (who satirized her exaggerated delivery as the character Didon in Gil Blas), and Voltaire.

=== Jean Dumas d'Aigueberre ===
Playwright Jean Dumas d'Aigueberre wrote:

Mlle D.C., according to our elders, [she] was in her time a great actress; I am willing to believe it, but I will be allowed to judge that by the taste of our time, and to scrutinize, not by what she was in her youth, but what she is today... I admit that she still brings a lot of grace and action to the theatre. She rises, becomes angry, inflamed, complains, and groans very well. But she fails in what is essential. She does not produce the same effects in the hearts of those who are present [the audience]. It is because her acting has no verisimilitude; she no longer seems to feel but to recite emphatically with methodic demonstrations. In a word, it is art, method, and habit, and not nature, that we see and observe in her.

— Jean Dumas d'Aigueberre

=== Lesage ===
Alain-René Lesage made unflattering remarks about her in the Book III of Gil Blas. He wrote:

Will you not agree that the actress who played the role of Dido is admirable? Did she not represent this queen with all the nobility and charm suitable to the idea we have of her? And did you not admire the art with which she engages a spectator and makes him feel the movements of all the passions she expresses? One can say that she has mastered the refinements of declamation. I agree, said Don Pompeyo, that she knows how to move and touch: no actress ever had more depth, and it is a fine performance. But she is not an actress without faults. Two or three things shocked me in her performance. When she wants to show surprise, she exaggeratedly rolls her eyes; which is unbecoming of a princess. Add to that by making her naturally sweet voice louder, she spoils its sweetness and forms a rather unpleasant hollow sound. Besides, it seemed to me, in more than one part of the play, that one might suspect her of not quite understanding what she was saying. Yet I would rather believe that she was distracted than accuse her of lacking intelligence.

— Alain-René Lesage

According to anecdotes, audience members also mocked aspects of her performance. At the premiere of Houdar de La Motte's Inês de Castro, some in the audience laughed when the children appeared onstage, to which an outraged Duclos broke character and rebuked them for laughing "at the most touching part of the tragedy!"

=== Voltaire ===
Voltaire was also very critical of Mademoiselle Duclos. He composed the following poem around 1715:

Beautiful Duclos,
You charm all of nature!
Beautiful Duclos,
You make even the gods jealous;
And Mars would try his luck
If he did not fear the god Mercury,
Beautiful Duclos

— Voltaire

He also mocked her in the famous “Credo” anecdote of Questions sur l'Encyclopédie:

“I'll bet Mademoiselle does not even know her ‘Credo.’ - Ah, ah, she said, I do not know my ‘Credo’! I will recite it to you. ‘Pater Noster who...’ Help me, I don't remember the rest.”

== Personal life ==
In 1725 she married the young actor Duchemin Jr., who was thirty-eight years her junior. She was 55 years of age and Duchemin was 17. The couple separated five years later. She left the stage in 1736 and died in 1748.

== In popular culture ==
- In the 2021 French series The Adventures of Young Voltaire, Duclos is portrayed by actress Constance Dollé.
