= Boullier =

Boullier is a surname. Notable people with the surname include:

- David Renaud Boullier] (1699–1759), Dutch theologian, minister and philosopher
- Éric Boullier (born 1973), French motor racing engineer and manager
