= Inès de Castro (1723 play) =

1723 play by Antoine Houdar de la Motte

Inès de Castro: tragedie
- Written by: Antoine Houdar de la Motte
- Original language: French
- Subject: Inês de Castro
- Genre: Tragedy

Premiere
- Date premiered: 6 April 1723
- Place premiered: France

Inès de Castro: tragedie is a French Tragedy play written by French playwright Antoine Houdar de la Motte.

== Background ==
Inès de Castro was written by Antoine Houdar de la Motte as a pseudo-classical adaptation of an old Portuguese play based on the subject of Inês de Castro. It was first presented in Paris on 6 April 1723 at the Comédie-Française and became a success on the French stage.

There are many other variations and adaptations of the Inès de Castro story with origins tracing back to António Ferreira's Castro. It is claimed that M. de la Motte wrote the tragedy by incorporating powerful emotions for theater. He then enlisted scholars to identify a historical event that aligned with the plot, settling on Inès de Castro's story, which led to the play's title.

De la Motte responded to parodies of his play by defending it in his Troisième discours à l'occasion de la tragédie Inés de Castro (1730).

De la Motte's adaptation was later translated into Spanish in 1826 by Manuel Bretón de los Herreros.
