= Nicolas Boindin =

French writer and playwright (1676–1751)

- Born: 29 May 1676; Paris, France
- Died: 30 November 1751 (aged 75); Paris, France
- Occupations: Writer; Playwright

Nicolas Boindin (29 May 1676 – 30 November 1751) was an 18th-century French writer and playwright.

Boindin was one of a circle of wits which included J. B. Rousseau, La Motte, Fontenelle, Saurin, the Abbé Terrasson, and Hénault. He became a member of the Académie des Inscriptions et Belles-Lettres in 1706, and was an habitué of the Café Procope. His atheist views were so notorious that Fleury later barred him from the Académie Française.

== Works ==
Theatre

- 1701: Les Trois Gascons, comedy in 1 act, with Antoine Houdar de La Motte, Paris, Théâtre de la rue des Fossés Saint-Germain, 4 June
- 1702: Le Bal d'Auteuil, comedy in 3 acts, Paris, Théâtre de la rue des Fossés Saint-Germain, 22 August
- 1702: La Matrone d'Éphèse, comédie, avec Antoine Houdar de La Motte
- 1704: Le Port de mer, comédie en 1 acte et en prose, Paris, Théâtre de la rue des Fossés Saint-Germain, 27 May
- 1753: Le Petit-Maître de robe, comedy in one act and in prose

Memoires

- 1717–1718: Lettres historiques à Mr D*** sur la nouvelle Comédie italienne, dans lesquelles il est parlé de son établissement, du caractère des acteurs qui la composent, des pièces qu'ils ont représentées jusqu'à présent, et des aventures qui y sont arrivées, Text online : 1re lettre 2e lettre 3e lettre
- 1719: Lettres historiques sur tous les spectacles de Paris, Text online(Lettre sur la Comédie française. Lettre sur l'Opéra. Lettre sur la Comédie italienne. Lettre sur les foires de Saint-Germain et de Saint Laurent.)
- 1752: Mémoire pour servir à l'histoire des couplets de 1710, attribués faussement à M. Rousseau (par N. Boindin). Le véritable paquet adressé à M. Boindin et, par conséquent, le vrai corps du délit, Text online
- 1753: Mémoires pour servir à l'histoire du célèbre Rousseau, où l'on prouve que les fameux couplets qui lui ont été faussement attribués sont réellement de La Motte, Saurin et Malafer. Nouvelle édition, augmentée du vrai caractère de Rousseau, en deux lettres de M. Racine et une de M. l'abbé d'Olivet
- 1761: Discours sur la forme et la construction du théâtre des anciens

Collected works

- 1746: Œuvres de théâtre, Text online
- 1753: Œuvres de monsieur Boindin, 2 vol., Text online 2

== Bibliography ==
- « Notice sur Boindin », in Suite du répertoire du Théâtre Français. Comédies en prose, Paris, chez Mme veuve Dabo, tome 1, 1822, (p. 121-125)
- Pierre Larousse, Grand Dictionnaire universel du XIXe siècle, vol. II, 1868, (p. 877)
