= Catharina Sperling-Heckel =

German miniature painter and etcher

- Catharina Heckel
- Born: April 10, 1699; Augsburg, Holy Roman Empire
- Died: May 28, 1741 (aged 42); Augsburg, Holy Roman Empire
- Known for: Engraving; Miniature painting
- Spouse: Hieronymus Sperling 1725-

Catharina Sperling-Heckel (10 April 1699 - 28 May 1741) was a German miniature painter, etcher and engraver.

== Life and work ==
Catharina Heckel was born in April 1699 in Augsburg. Her father was Michael Heckel. He was a goldsmith and taught Heckel how to paint and draw. She was taught engraving by Johann Ulrich Kraus. She married Hieronymus Sperling in 1725. In 1728, she painted a miniature portrait of Charles Edward Stuart. She died from complications from childbirth, within weeks of the birth of her first child, in May 1741.

== Notable collections ==
- Moses' arms grow heavy as he prays for the victory of the Israelites over the Amalecites; an outstretched arm is anatomically depicted, c. 1735, Wellcome Collection

== Gallery ==
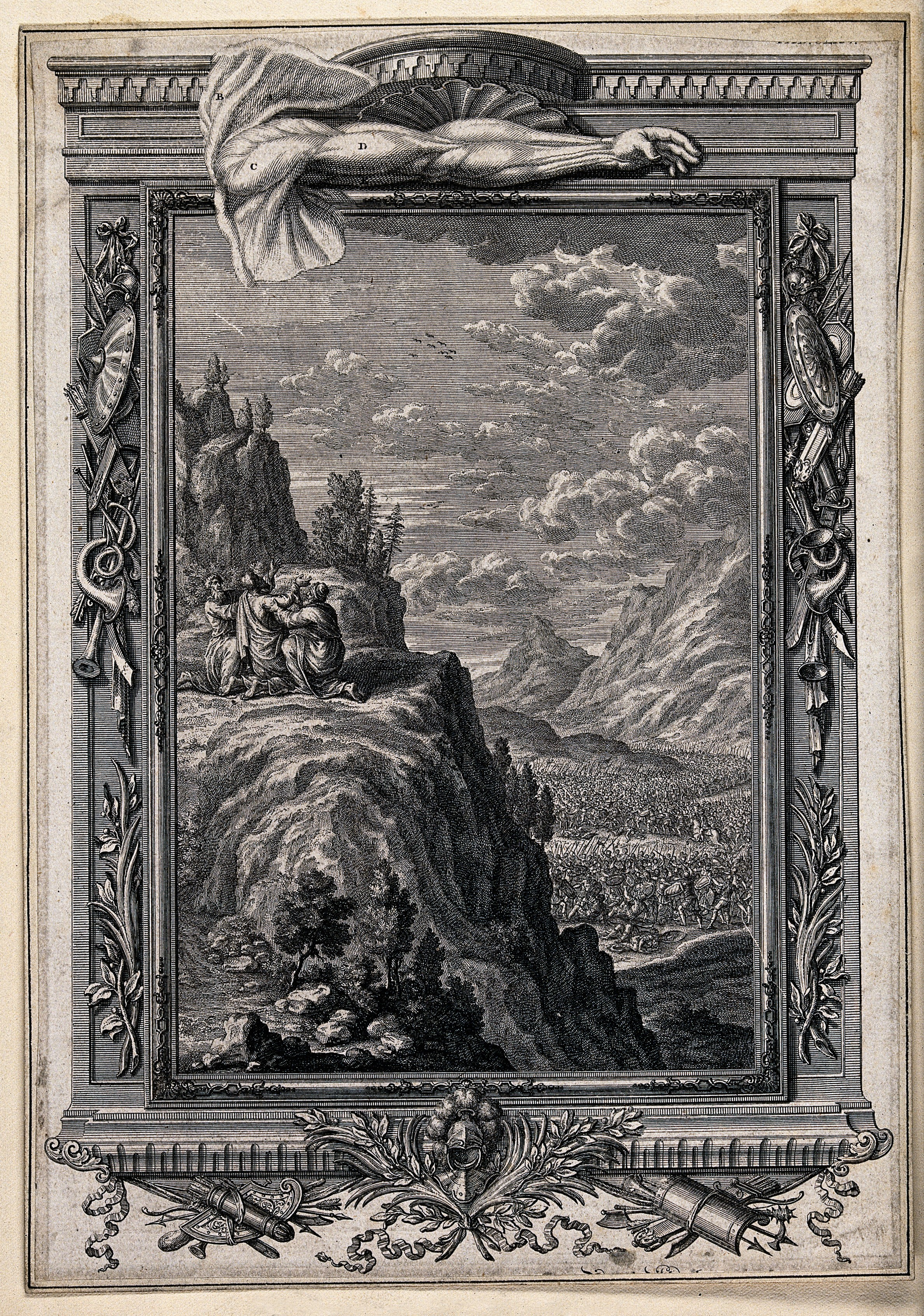
Moses' arms grow heavy as he prays for the victory of the Israelites over the Amalecites; an outstretched arm is anatomically depicted, c. 1735
