= Antoine Houdar de la Motte =

French author (1672–1731)

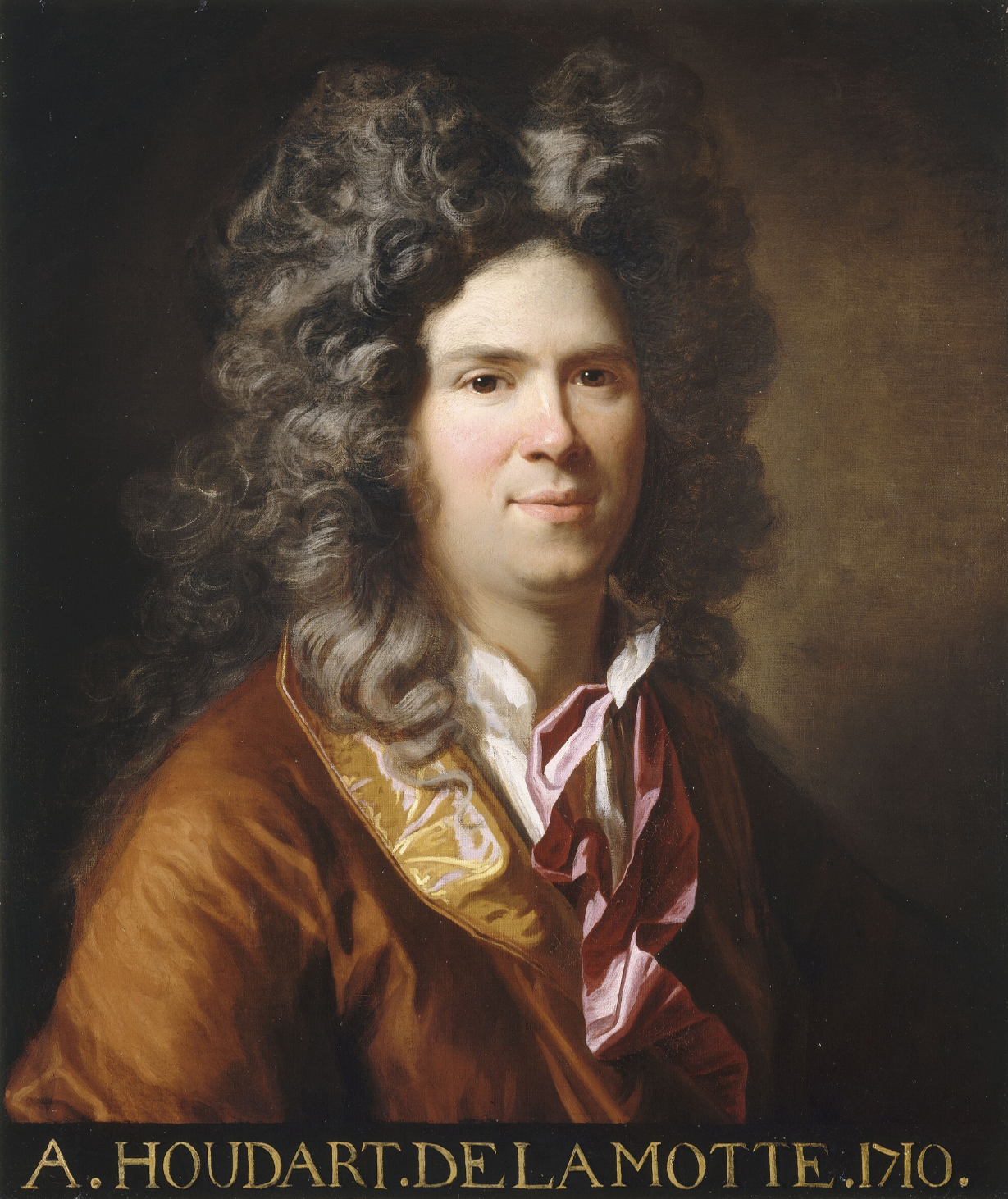
- Born: 18 January 1672; Paris, France
- Died: 26 December 1731 (aged 59); Paris, France
- Occupations: Choreographer, writer, librettist, playwright, poet

Antoine Houdar de la Motte (18 January 1672 – 26 December 1731) was a French writer.

De la Motte was born and died in Paris. In 1693 his comedy, Les Originaux (Les originaux, ou, l'Italien), was a complete failure, and so depressed the author that he contemplated joining the Trappists. Four years later he began writing texts for operas and ballets, e.g. L'Europe galante (1697), and tragedies, one of which, Inès de Castro (1723), was an immense success at the Theâtre Français. He was a champion of the moderns in the revived controversy of the ancients and moderns. His Fables nouvelles (1719) was regarded as a modernist manifesto. Anne Dacier had published (1711) a translation of the Iliad, and La Motte, who knew no Greek, made a translation (1714) in verse founded on her work.

He said of his own work: "I have taken the liberty to change what I thought disagreeable in it." He defended the moderns in the Discours sur Homère prefixed to his translation, and in his Réflexions sur la critique (1716). Apart from the merits of the controversy, it was conducted on La Motte's side with a wit and politeness which compared very favourably with his opponents' methods. He was elected to the Académie Française in 1710, but soon afterwards went blind. La Motte carried on a correspondence with the duchesse du Maine, and was the friend of Fontenelle. He had the same freedom from prejudice and the same inquiring mind as the latter, and it is on the excellent prose in which his views are expressed that his reputation rests.

His Œuvres du theâtre (2 vols.) appeared in 1730, and his Œuvres (10 vols.) in 1754. See Hippolyte Rigault, Histoire de la querelle des anciens et des modernes (1859).

== Poetry ==
- 1701: Le Premier livre de l'Iliade, translated into French verse
- 1707: Églogue sur la naissance de Mgr le duc de Bretagne
- Odes
  - 1707: Odes avec un Discours sur la poésie en général, et sur l'ode en particulier, (several latter editions)
  - 1712: Le Deuil de la France, ode
  - 1712: Le Souverain, ode
  - 1716: Ode sur la mort de Louis le Grand, ode
  - 1720: La critique, ode
- Fables
  - 1714: Le Cygne, fable allegorique
  - 1719: Fables nouvelles, Paris, (several latter editions)
  - 1720: L'Indien et le soleil

== Critics ==
- 1714: Discours sur Homère
- 1715: Réflexions sur la critique, Paris, G. Du Puis
- 1719: Discours sur la fable, Paris, Grégoire Dupuis
- 1754: Discours sur la poésie, Paris, Prault l'aîné
- 1754: Discours sur la tragédie, Paris, Prault l'aîné
- 1730: Suite des Réflexions sur la tragédie

== Theatre ==
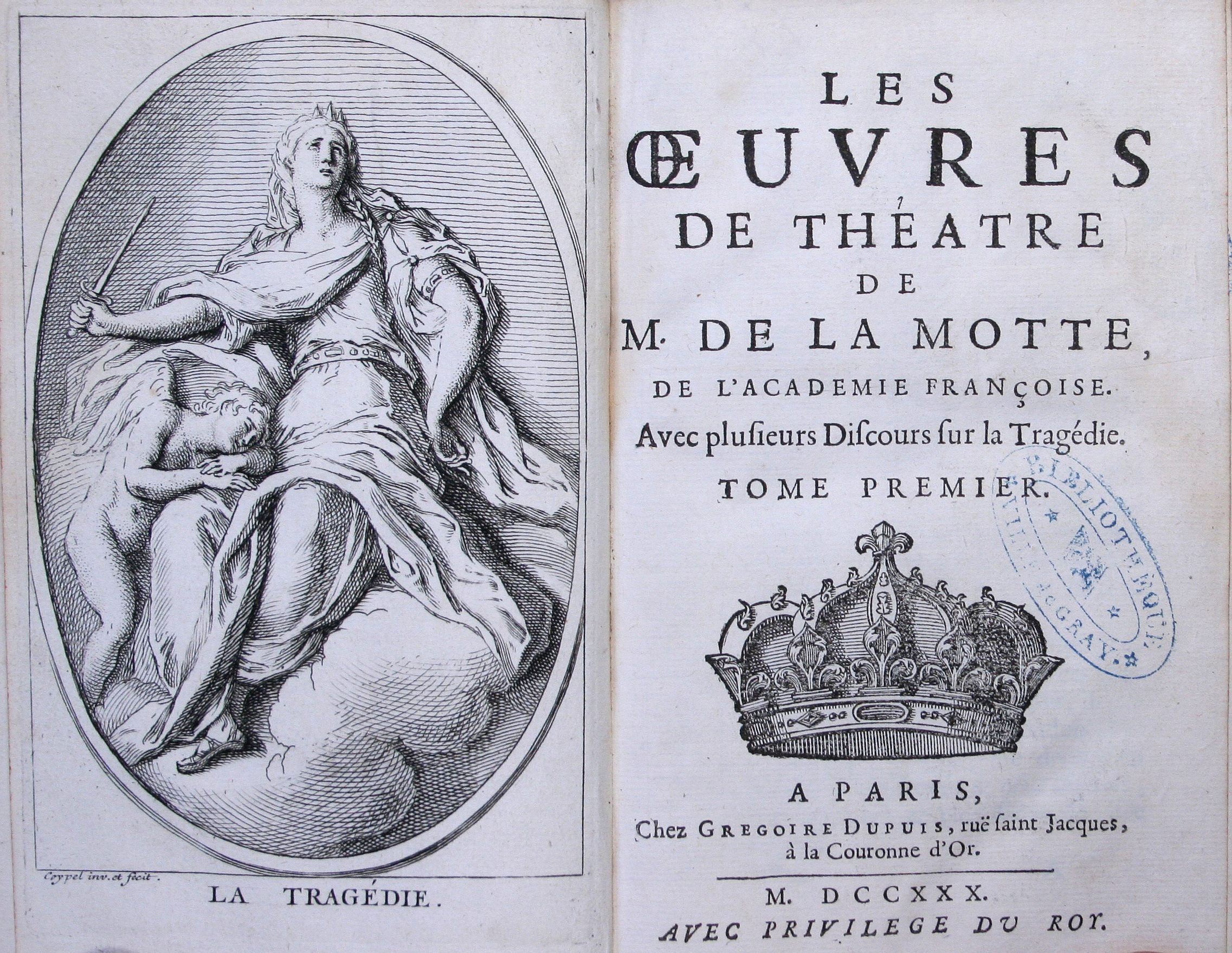
Frontispice and title of a 1730 edition Les Œuvres de théâtre (exemplaire de la bibliothèque patrimoniale de Gray)

- 1693: Les Originaux ou l'Italien, three-act comedy, music by M. de Masse, presented at théâtre de l'Hôtel de Bourgogne, 13 August
- 1697: Issé, pastorale héroïque in 3 acts with prologue, présented at Château de Fontainebleau 7 October
- 1697: L'Europe galante, opéra-ballet in 4 acts and a prologue, music by André Campra, given at Théâtre du Palais-Royal (Académie royale de musique) 24 October
- 1699: Amadis de Grèce, tragédie lyrique in 5 acts and a prologue, music by André Cardinal Destouches, given 25 March (Académie royale de musique)
- 1699: Marthésie, première reine des Amazones, tragédie lyrique in 5 acts and one prologue, music by André Cardinal Destouches, presented at Château de Fontainebleau 11 October
- 1700: Le Triomphe des arts, opéra-ballet in 5 acts, music by Michel de La Barre, presented at théâtre du Palais-Royal (Académie royale de musique) 16 May
- 1700: Canente, tragédie lyrique in 5 acts and one prologue, music by Pascal Collasse and Antoine Dauvergne, presented at Théâtre du Palais-Royal (Académie royale de musique) 4 November
- 1701: Les Trois Gascons, comédie avec divertissements in 1 act, with Nicolas Boindin, music by Giuseppe Maria Cambini and Nicolas Racot de Grandval, dit Grandval le Père, presented at Comédie-Française 4 June
- 1701: Omphale, tragédie lyrique in 5 acts and one prologue, music by André Cardinal Destouches, presented at Théâtre du Palais-Royal (Académie royale de musique) 10 November
- 1702: La Matrone d'Éphèse, comedy in 1 act and in prose, presented at Comédie-Française 23 September
- 1703: Le Carnaval et la folie, comédie-ballet in 4 acts and one prologue, music by André Cardinal Destouches, presented at Château de Fontainebleau 3 January
- 1704: Le Port de mer, comedy in 1 act and in prose, with Nicolas Boindin, music by Nicolas Racot de Grandval, called Grandval le Père, presented at Comédie-Française 27 May
- 1705: La Vénitienne, opéra-ballet in one prologue and 3 acts, music by Michel de La Barre, presented at Théâtre du Palais-Royal (Académie royale de musique) 26 May. This same text was later set by Antoine Dauvergne, Académie royale de musique, 6 May 1768
- 1709: Sémélé, tragédie lyrique in 5 acts, music by Marin Marais, presented at Théâtre du Palais-Royal (Académie royale de musique) 9 April
- 1715: La Ceinture de Vénus, tableau dramatique, music by Jean-Joseph Mouret, presented at Château de Sceaux 19 April
- 1706: Alcione, tragédie lyrique in 5 acts and a prologue, music by Marin Marais, presented at Théâtre du Palais-Royal (Académie royale de musique), 18 February
- 1715: Apollon et les muses, tableau dramatique, music by Jean-Joseph Mouret, presented at Château de Sceaux 19 April
- 1716: L'Amante difficile ou l'amant constant, comedy in 5 acts and in prose, with Pierre Rémond de Sainte-Albine, presented at Théâtre de l'Hôtel de Bourgogne 17 October
- 1721: Les Macchabées, tragedy in 5 acts and in verse, presented à la Comédie-Française 6 March
- 1722: Romulus, tragedy in 5 acts and in verse, presented at Comédie-Française 8 January
- 1723: Inès de Castro, tragedy in 5 acts and in verse, presented at Comédie-Française 6 April
- 1726: Œdipe, tragedy in 5 acts and in verse, presented at Comédie-Française 18 March
- 1730: Dalcyone, opera, presented in September
- 1731: L'Italie galante ou les contes, comedy in one prologue and 3 parts (Le Talisman, Richard Minutolo, Le Magnifique), presented at Comédie-Française 11 May
- 1731: L'Amante difficile, divertissement in 5 acts and in prose, music by Jean-Joseph Mouret, presented at Théâtre de l'Hôtel de Bourgogne 23 August
- 1735: Scanderberg, tragédie lyrique in 5 acts and a prologue, with Jean-Louis-Ignace de La Serre, music by François Francœur and François Rebel, presented at Théâtre du Palais-Royal (Académie royale de musique) 25 October
- 1748: Pygmalion, ballet, reworked by Ballot de Sauvot, music by Jean-Philippe Rameau, presented at Château de Fontainebleau 27 August
- 1753: Prométhée, prologue in verse, presented in Paris 9 January
- 1753: Titon et l'Aurore, pastorale héroïque in 3 acts, with Claude-Henri de Fusée de Voisenon and Abbé de La Marre, music by Jean-Joseph Cassanéa de Mondonville, presented at Théâtre du Palais-Royal (Académie royale de musique) 9 January
- 1753: Le Magnifique, comedy in 2 acts and one prologue with three intermèdes, presented at château de Fontainebleau 15 November
- Le Ballet des fées, ballet
- Le Calendrier des vieillards, comedy in 1 act and in prose
- Climène, pastorale in 1 act and in verse
- Les Âges, opéra-ballet in 4 acts and one prologue
