= Christian Tobias Damm =

German classical philologist (1699–1778)

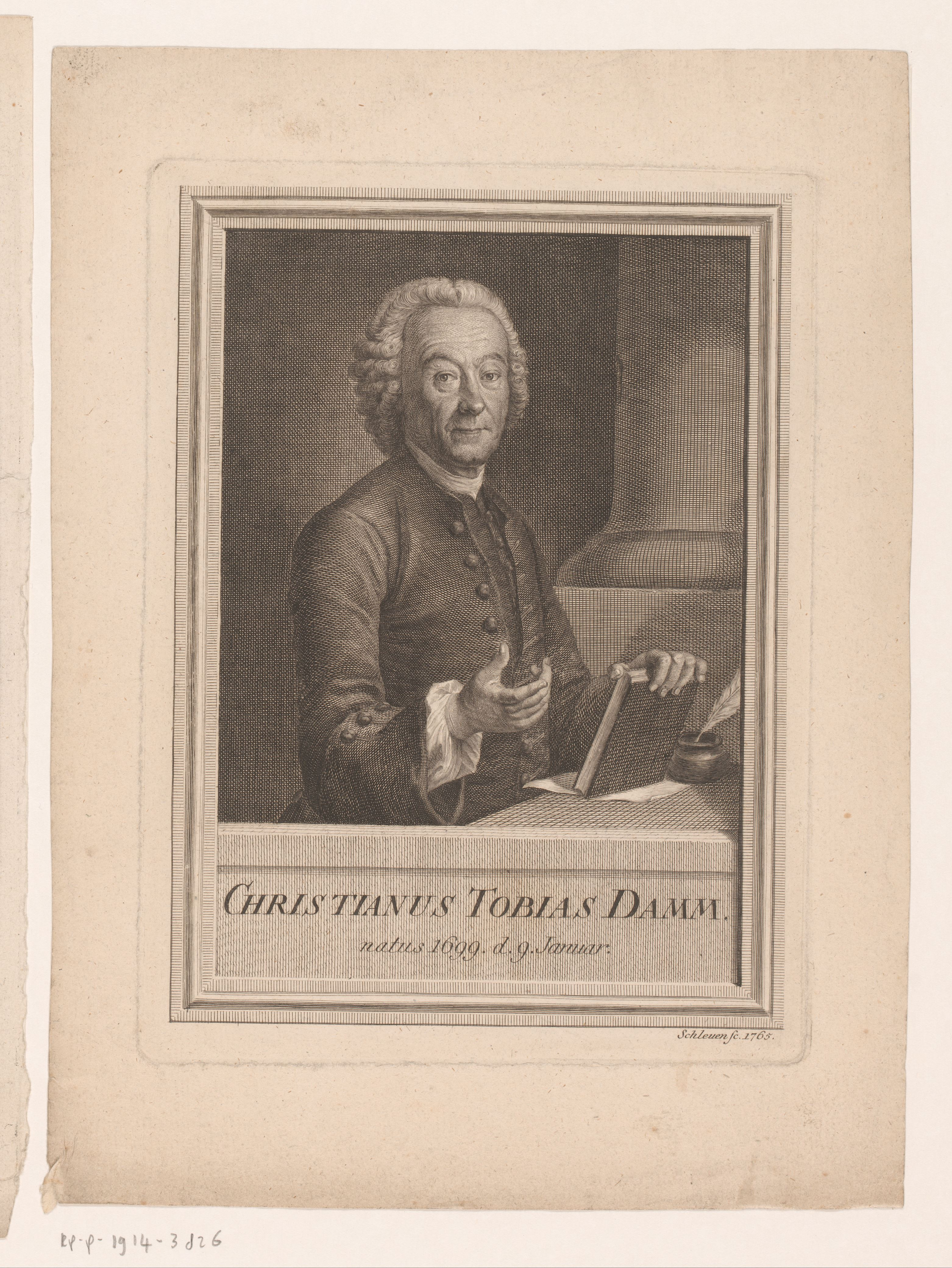
Portrait of Christian Tobias Damm by Johann Friedrich Schleuen.

Christian Tobias Damm (9 January 1699 – 27 May 1778) was a renowned German Classical philologist, and the less than orthodox theologian who was rector (1730) and prorector (1742) of the Köllnische Gymnasium, the oldest in Berlin, but prematurely pensioned off in 1766, in the wake of scandalized accusations of trends towards Socianian doctrines in some of his work, to his lasting bitterness.

== Life ==
Damm was born in Geithain, Electorate of Saxony. He studied at Halle. and was the author of a herculean etymological dictionary of those words of ancient Greek represented in his concordances of both Homer and Pindar, both of whom he had translated, and a Compendium historiae fabulosae or Handbuch der Mythologie der Griechen und Römer, that applied euhemerist interpretations of Greek mythology in the Christian and Enlightenment traditions; the work remained standard through the 19th century. His essay on the Epistle of James was published in Berlin, 1747. His prose translation of Homer (1769 and 1777), competing with verse translations by Bürger and Stolberg (for the Deutsches Museum), raised the witty obituary in the Bibiothek der schönen Wissenschaften: "Homer, Greek poet, dead in Berlin!" As a philologist, he urged that, on rational grounds, the letter h be dropped from German orthography in cases in which it appeared in final position in a word, as "an unfounded practice that appears barbaric in the eyes of foreigners and thus insulting to our nation", for which Johann Georg Hamann, friend of Kant and teacher of Herder, took him to task, defending the h on human terms, as speaking "with a human voice"; purging language of such irrationalities, the proto-Romantic Herder asserted, was an "assault on the colour, beauty, texture, character, virility, history, and even spirituality of language", as Graeme Garrard has expressed it, in one of the first shots of the Counter-Enlightenment.

Damm was a teacher (in 1735) and later a correspondent of Johann Joachim Winckelmann and a friend of Moses Mendelssohn, who called him "the Greek oracle of Speestadt".

He died in Berlin, aged 79.
