= Odet-Joseph Giry =

French clergyman (1699–1761)

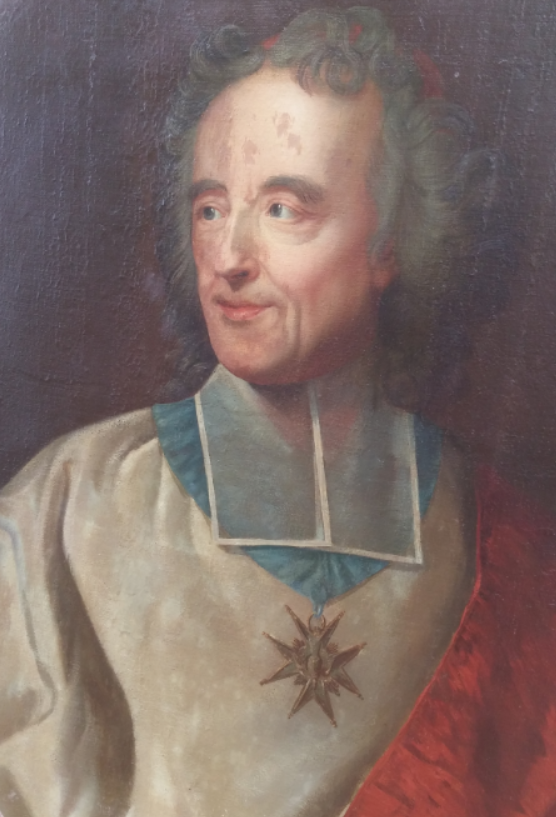
Joseph Giry Portrait

Joseph Giry de Saint Cyr, also known as Odet-Joseph de Vaux de Giry (14 February 1699 – 13 January 1761) was a French clergyman. His name remains associated with the "cacouacs", a mocking term for the Encyclopédistes.

== Biography ==
Doctor of theology Abbé Joseph de Giry de Saint Cyr was sub-preceptor of the Dauphin of France, Councilor of State and member of the French Academy elected in 1741 and finally commendatory of the Abbey of Saint-Martin de Troarn from 1749 when he died.

The “Cacouacs Affair” broke out in October 1757 when an anonymous article appeared in the Mercure de France titled Useful Opinion or First Memoir on the Cacouacs . The term "cacouac", which means "the bad ones", was invented to ridicule the Encyclopedists. Shortly after, Jacob-Nicolas Moreau published a pamphlet titled New memoir on the Cacouacs, which Joseph Giry in turn followed with a Catechism and decisions of cases of conscience for the use of cacouacs with a speech by the patriarch of the cacouacs, for the reception of a new disciple. Published in Paris, this one bears as place of publication “Cacopolis”.
