= Castro (play) =

1598 play by António Ferreira

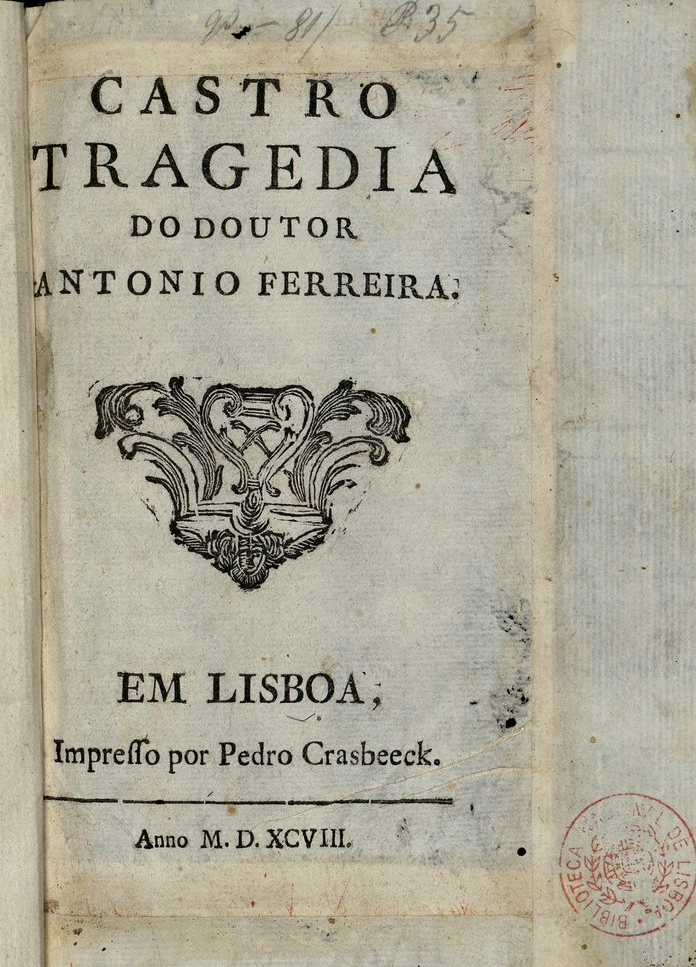
- Written by: António Ferreira
- Original language: Portuguese
- Subject: Inês de Castro
- Genre: Tragedy

Premiere
- Date premiered: 1598
- Place premiered: Portugal

Castro is a Portuguese tragedy play written by Portuguese poet António Ferreira. It is considered the first classical tragedy composed in Portuguese.

== Background ==
Castro is the first tragedy play written entirely in Portuguese. It was authored by António Ferreira, a poet and dramatist that's widely regarded as one of the founding figures of Portuguese Renaissance literature. Composed around 1556 in Portugal's Coimbra, the play was left unpublished by Ferreira, who later shifted to a legal career in Lisbon. It was later published posthumously after his death.

The play was first presented in Ferreira's hometown of Lisbon, Portugal in 1598. It was printed by Pedro Craesbeeck who was a Portuguese printer and bookseller. The tragedy was first translated into English by Thomas Moore Musgrave in London in 1825, marking a significant step in introducing the Portuguese literature to English-speaking audiences.

The story of Inez de Castro was often adapted by Portuguese poets. Ferreira's theme for the play is reportedly based on a passage of the latin poem The Lusiadas by Luís de Camões.

== Roles ==
The main characters in the play included Inês de Castro with her nurse (ama), Infante Don Pedro with his secretary, King Alphonso with three merciless counselors, and a messenger.

Role
Castro (Inês de Castro)
Ama (Caretaker)
Choro das mocas de Coimbra (Lament of the Girls of Coimbra)
Infante D. Pedro (Peter I of Portugal)
Secretario jeu (Secretrary)
El Rey D. Afonso IIII (Afonso IV of Portugal)
Pêro Coelho
Diogo Lopes Pacheco (son of Lopo Fernandes Pacheco)
Messageiro (Messenger)

== Synopsis ==
The play centers on the tragic story of Inês de Castro, a noblewoman who was famously executed in the 14th century on orders from King Afonso IV of Portugal, despite her romantic relationship with his son, Pedro. Act I opens with Inês's lament and Don Pedro's debate over his conflicting loyalties, supported by a chorus singing a hymn to love. The subsequent acts continue this blend of dialogue and chorus until Act IV, where the chorus announces Inês's death, and in Act V, a messenger delivers the news to Don Pedro.
