= Johann Friedrich Ruhe =

German composer

Johann Friedrich Ruhe (28 September 1699, in Halberstadt – 1776) was a German composer

== Recordings ==
J.F. Ruhe: Sonatas for Violin da Gamba & Continuo Sándor Szászvárosi (viola da gamba), Kousay H. Mahdi Kadduri (baroque cello), Angelika Csizmadia (harpsichord) Hungaroton 2007
