= Questions sur l'Encyclopédie =

Questions sur l’Encyclopédie, par des amateurs is a philosophical work by Voltaire, the first edition of which was published in 9 volumes by Cramer in Geneva between 1770 and 1772.

From the Kehl edition (1784–1789) onward, its contents were incorporated into the Philosophical Dictionary of 1764, alongside other alphabetically arranged texts. Recent editions have untangled these compilations to restore the original content of each work.

Written in alphabetical order, the text is considered a summation of Voltaire's thought.

== Publication history ==
=== Composition ===
Voltaire initially considered contributing to a Supplement to the Encyclopédie envisioned by the bookseller Panckoucke, a project that, after many transformations, would eventually lead to the Encyclopédie méthodique. By the end of 1769, however, Voltaire began drafting "alphabetical scraps": “It is a great pleasure to put one's thoughts on paper, to clarify them for oneself, and to enlighten others by enlightening oneself.”

=== Voltaire's own publications ===
Questions sur l’Encyclopédie, par des amateurs was published by Cramer in Geneva in nine volumes plus one Supplement. The print run was 4,000 copies.

The first three volumes appeared in November–December 1770, comprising 141 articles, 20 of which were taken wholly or partly from the Philosophical Dictionary. The other 121 were new texts, sometimes adapted from previously published works, such as “Bees,” “Air,” and “Anatomy,” inspired by Singularities of Nature; “Apostate,” based on Of Julian and Julian the Apostate’s Speech against the Christians; and “On Bacon,” which echoes ideas from the Elements of the Philosophy of Newton.

Five further volumes were released from March to December 1771, totaling 207 mainly original articles. Some, like “God,” reused material from God, a response to The System of Nature—a rebuttal to Baron d’Holbach’s The System of Nature.

Volume IX and the Supplement (with 19 and 55 articles respectively) appeared in 1772.

A New edition, carefully revised, corrected, and expanded was issued in 1771–1772 by the Société typographique de Neuchâtel in 2,500 copies, which Voltaire labeled a counterfeit—even though he had revised some articles, such as adding a note about the Chevalier de la Barre affair in the article “On Crimes or Offenses.”

A counterfeit dated London was published by Marc-Michel Rey in Amsterdam (1771–1772), containing Notes that defended Jean-Jacques Rousseau where Voltaire had attacked him.

In the Complete Collection of Voltaire's Works published by Cramer (Geneva) and Panckoucke (Paris), Questions sur l’Encyclopédie spans volumes 21–24 (1774). The Supplement articles were alphabetized. Voltaire added 25 articles (e.g., “Slavery,” “Mohammedans,” “Number”) and revised others like “Apocalypse,” “Government,” and “Taxes.”

In the so-called “Framed Edition” of 1775 (Cramer and Bardin), Questions sur l’Encyclopédie spans volumes 25–30. Voltaire’s own annotated copy in Saint Petersburg contains manuscript notes for a future edition.

=== Disappearance of the Questions ===
In the Kehl edition of Voltaire's Complete Works, the Questions articles were incorporated—according to the editors' foreword—into the reprinted Philosophical Dictionary under the title La Raison par alphabet, along with the manuscript L’Opinion en alphabet, articles Voltaire had contributed to the Encyclopédie, and other brief texts. This corpus occupied volumes 37–43.

This editorial "monster," in which the Questions were subsumed, was reproduced identically in later editions, such as those by Beuchot (1831–1841) and Moland (1877–1885).

Only recent editions have restored the original structure of the work.

== Contents ==
Written in alphabetical order, the unsigned work is attributed to a society of amateurs supposedly residing on the fictional Mount Krapack.

This wasn’t Voltaire’s first use of “Question” in a title, a rhetorical strategy that feigns naivety and stimulates curiosity from a public eager for answers.

The book includes tales, poems, discourses, dialogues, jabs at favorite targets (Chaumeix, Fréron, La Beaumelle, Lefranc de Pompignan), as well as mischievous or surprising digressions. Some articles are in the first person and often diverge from their titles, ranging from a few lines to dozens of pages.

Its relationship to the Encyclopédie is ambiguous: Voltaire critiques, supports, or complements it, while expanding on his own views in entries with unusual titles like “Ass,” “Commonplaces in Literature,” or “Lazy Bellies.”

The Bouquins edition categorizes the 105 articles on religion and superstition, 62 on history, 59 on philosophy, 56 on natural sciences, 55 on arts and literature, 51 on biblical criticism, 42 on politics, 40 on church history, 40 on customs, 36 on law and justice, 22 on economics, and 21 on language. The editors describe the work as: “Voltaire undertook to gather, in the form of a dictionary, all ideas and views that occurred to him on the various subjects of his reflections—in short, nearly the entire range of human knowledge…”

According to critics, the Questions sur l’Encyclopédie, “so varied and thought-provoking, offer a chance to immerse oneself in Voltaire’s thinking—its finest synthesis.”

They represent “the sum of Voltaire’s thought [… he] practiced a form of encyclopedism inspired by curiosity.”

== Bibliography ==
=== Editions ===
- Questions sur l’Encyclopédie, par des amateurs, edited by Christiane Mervaud and Nicolas Cronk, Voltaire Foundation, University of Oxford, Œuvres complètes de Voltaire:
  - Volume 37 (2018): Introduction and general index. ISBN 978-0-7294-0921-6
  - Volume 38 (2007): A–Aristée. ISBN 978-0-7294-0854-7
  - Volume 39 (2008): Aristote–Certain. ISBN 978-0-7294-0905-6
  - Volume 40 (2009): César–Égalité. ISBN 978-0-7294-0922-3
  - Volume 41 (2010): Église–Fraude. ISBN 978-0-7294-0923-0
  - Volume 42B (2011): Gargantua–Justice. ISBN 978-0-7294-0924-7
  - Volume 42B (2012): Langues–Prières. ISBN 978-0-7294-1041-0
  - Volume 43 (2013): Privilège–Zoroastre. ISBN 978-0-7294-0925-4
- Questions sur l’Encyclopédie, ed. Nicolas Cronk, Christiane Mervaud, and Gillian Pink, Robert Laffont, Bouquins series, 2019. ISBN 978-2-221-12210-5
- Online edition, ARTFL/Tout Voltaire
  - Letters A–B
  - Letters C–E
  - Letters F–L
  - Letters M–Z

=== Critical articles ===
Recent scholarly interest has grown with the availability of the restored text.

- Copier/coller: écriture et réécriture chez Voltaire, Pisa, June 30 – July 2, 2005. Ed. Olivier Ferret, Gianluigi Goggi, and Catherine Volpilhac-Auger, Pisa University Press, 2007. ISBN 978-88-8492-430-8
- Ulla Kölving, article Questions sur l’Encyclopédie in Dictionnaire général de Voltaire, eds. Raymond Trousson and Jeroom Vercruysse, Paris, Honoré Champion, 2020, pp. 1019–1023. ISBN 978-2-38096-016-7
- Christiane Mervaud, “The Encyclopedism of Voltaire’s Questions sur l’Encyclopédie.” Read online
- Michel Mervaud, “Voltaire lexicographer. On neologisms, verbal creations, and rare words in the Questions,” in Revue Voltaire 11/2011. Read online
- Alain Sandrier, “Œuvres complètes de Voltaire, Questions sur l’Encyclopédie par des amateurs,” Recherches sur Diderot et l’Encyclopédie 49/2014. Read online
