= Françoise-Louise de Warens =

Swiss baroness (1699–1762)

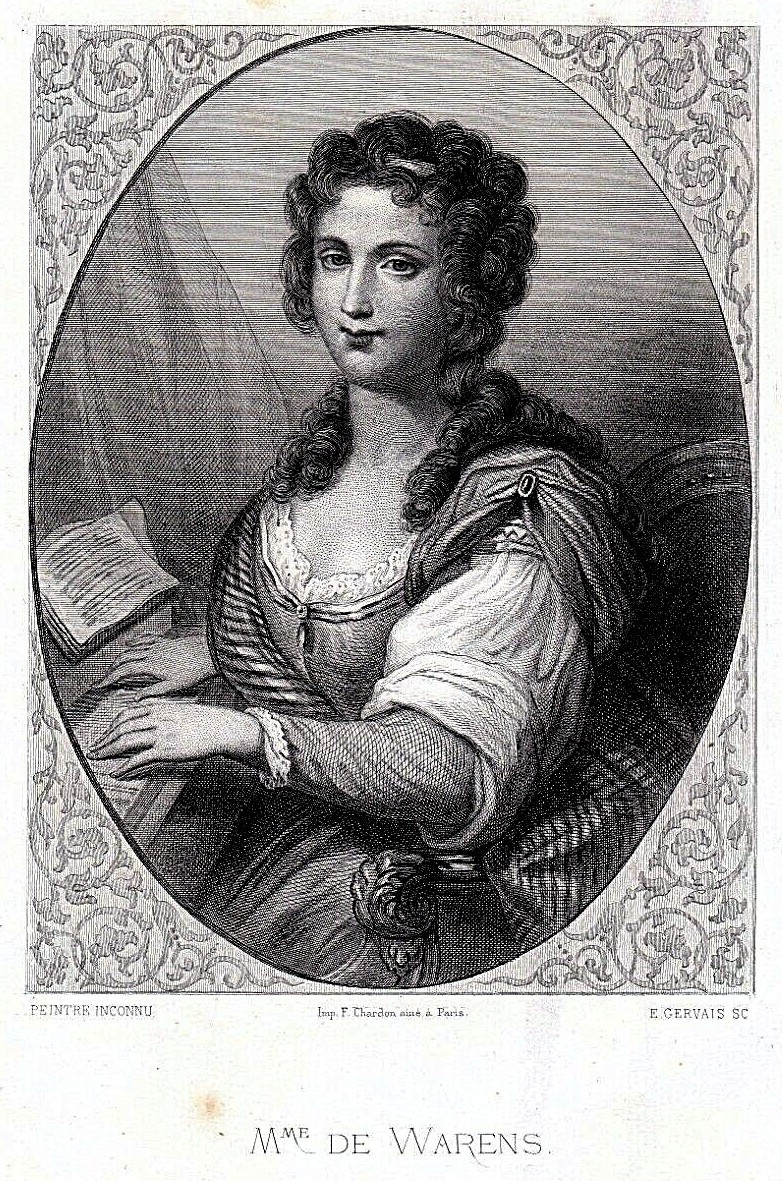
Françoise-Louise de Warens

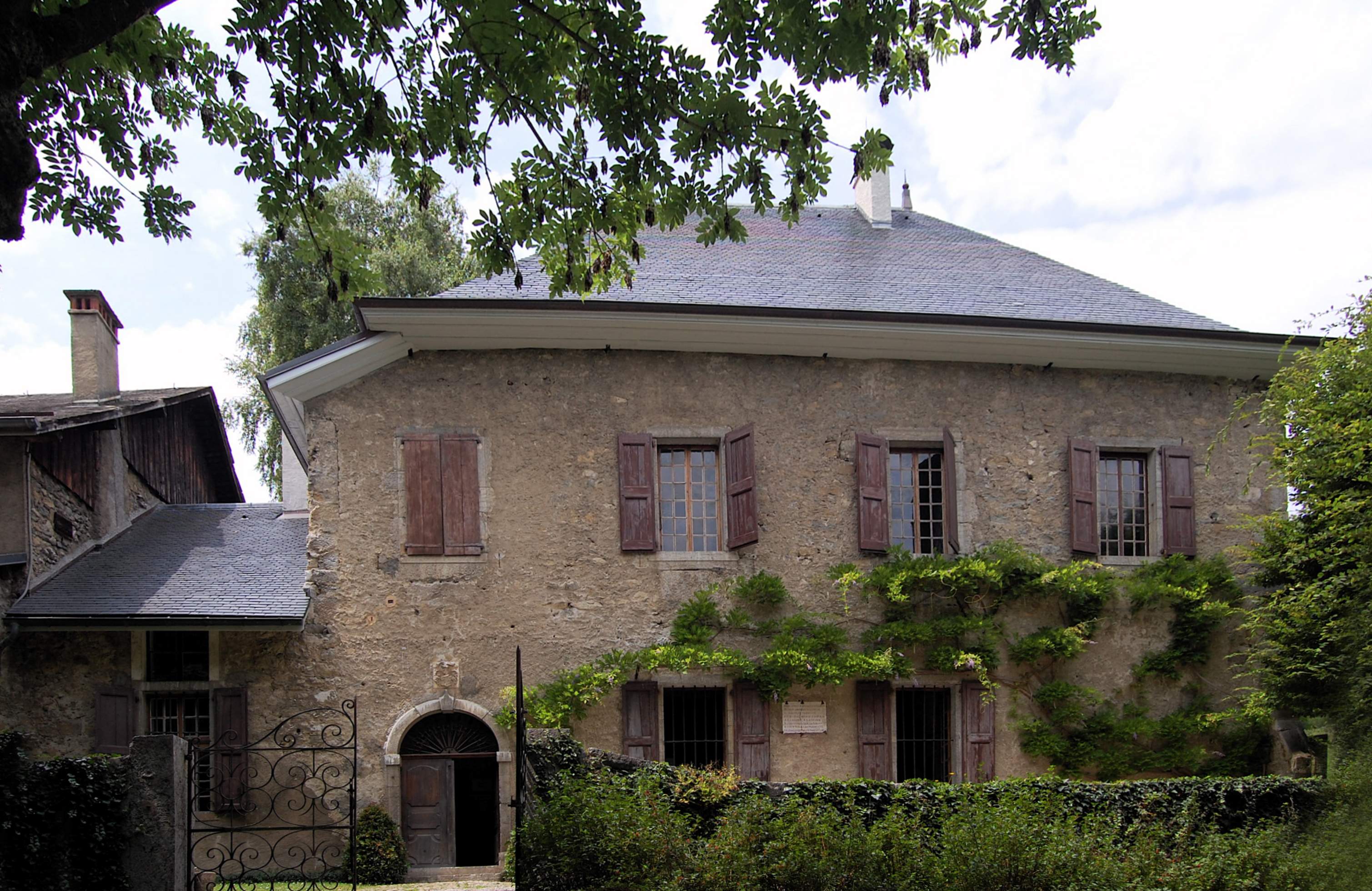
The house where Jean-Jacques Rousseau lived with Mme de Warens in 1735–36. It is now a museum dedicated to Rousseau.

Françoise-Louise de Warens, born Louise Éléonore de la Tour du Pil, also called Madame de Warens (31 March 1699 – 29 July 1762), was the benefactress and mistress of Jean-Jacques Rousseau.

Warens was born in Vevey, into a Swiss Protestant family who had immigrated to Annecy, but became a Roman Catholic in 1726 in order to receive a church pension which had been instated to increase the spread of Roman Catholicism near Geneva, then a bastion of Protestantism.

She was known to have led a liberal life for a woman of her time. She annulled her marriage to M. de Warens in 1726 after failing in a clothing business. Rousseau met her for the first time on Palm Sunday 1728. It was said that she was a spy and a converter for Savoy, then part of the Kingdom of Sardinia. Though Warens was originally a teacher to Rousseau, they became sexually engaged after she openly initiated him in the matters of love and "intimacy". Françoise-Louise de Warens died in poverty in 1762 in Chambéry, of which Rousseau did not learn until six years afterwards. Rousseau describes his relationship with her in his Confessions.
