= António Ferreira (poet) =

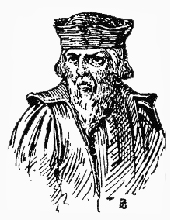
- Born: 1528; Lisbon, Portugal
- Died: 29 November 1569 (aged 40–41); Lisbon, Portugal
- Occupation: Poet

António Ferreira (1528 – 29 November 1569) was a Portuguese poet and the foremost representative of the classical school, founded by Francisco de Sá de Miranda. His most considerable work, Castro, is the first tragedy in Portuguese, and the second in modern European literature.

== His life ==
Ferreira was a native of Lisbon. His father held the post of escrivão de fazenda (estate clerk) in the house of the Duke of Coimbra at Setúbal. In 1547, he went to the University of Coimbra, and graduated with a bachelor's degree. He took his doctor's degree on 14 July 1555, an event which was celebrated, according to custom, by a sort of Roman triumph, and he stayed on as a professor, finding Coimbra, with its picturesque environs, congenial to his poetical tastes and love of a country life.

Ferreira was intimate with princes, nobles and the most distinguished literary men of the time, such as the scholarly Diogo de Teive, and the poets Bernardes, Caminha and Corte-Real. In 1558, at the age of 29, he married D. Maria Pimentel. After a short and happy married life, his wife died.

On 14 October 1567, he became Desembargador da Casa do Cível, and had to leave the quiet of Coimbra for Lisbon. His verses tell how he disliked the change, and how the bustle of the capital, then a great commercial emporium, made him sad and almost tongue-tied for poetry. The intrigues and moral twists of the courtiers and traders, among whom he was forced to live, hurt his fine sense of honor, and he felt his mental isolation more, because his friends were few and scattered in that great city which the discoveries and conquests of the Portuguese had made the centre of a world empire.

In 1569, a terrible epidemic of carbunculous fever broke out and carried off 50,000 inhabitants of Lisbon, and, on 29 November, Ferreira, who had stayed there doing his duty when others fled; fell a victim.

== His works ==
Ferreira wrote the Terentian prose comedy, Bristo in (1553), at the age of twenty-five, and dedicated it to Prince John in the name of the university. It is neither a comedy of character nor manners, but its vis comica lies in its plot and situations. The Cioso, a later product, may almost be called a comedy of character.

The death in 1554 of Prince John, the heir to the throne, drew from him, as from Camões, Bernardes and Caminha, a poetical lament, which consisted of an elegy and two eclogues, imitative of Virgil and Horace. Later, the year 1557 produced his sixth elegy, addressed to the son of Afonso de Albuquerque, a poem of noble patriotism expressed in eloquent and sonorous verse.

=== The Sonnets ===
The sonnets forming the First Book in his collected works, date from 1552 and contain the history of his early love for an unknown lady. They seem to have been written in Coimbra or during vacations in Lisbon. The sonnets in the Second Book were inspired by his wife, and they are marked by that chastity of sentiment, seriousness and ardent patriotism. The ninth sonnet of Book 2, written after her premature death, describes her end in moving words. This loss lent Ferreira's verse an added austerity, and the independence of his muse is remarkable when he addresses King Sebastian and reminds him of his duties as well as his rights.

=== Castro ===
Castro is Ferreira's most considerable work, and the first tragedy in Portuguese, and the second in modern European literature. Though fashioned on the great models of the ancients, it has little plot or action, and the characters, except that of the prince, are ill-designed. The poem consists of a chorus which sings the fate of Inês in musical odes. His love is the chaste, timid affection of a wife and a vassal, rather than the strong passion of a mistress, but Pedro is really the man, history describes, the love-fettered prince whom the tragedy of Inês’s death converted into the cruel tyrant. King Afonso is little more than a shadow, and only meets Inês once, his son never; while, stranger still, Pedro and Inês never come on the stage together, and their love is merely narrated. Nevertheless, Ferreira merits all praise for choosing one of the most dramatic episodes in Portuguese history for his subject, and though it has since been handled by poets of renown in many different languages, none has been able to surpass the old master.

=== Other works ===
Ferreira also authored a brief epic poem called Historia de S.ta Comba dos Valles (History of Saint Comba of the Valleys), based on a religious legend of Lamas de Orelhão, Valpaços tracing to the Moorish occupation in pre-foundation Portugal.

== His ideals ==
Ferreira's ideal, as a poet, was to win the applause of the good, and, in the preface to his poems, he says, "I am content with this glory, that I have loved my land and my people." He was intimate with the aged Sá de Miranda, the founder of the classical school of which Ferreira became the foremost representative. Horace was his favorite poet, erudition his muse, and his admiration of the classics made him disdain the popular poetry of the Old School (Escola Velha) represented by Gil Vicente.

His national feeling would not allow him to write in Latin or Spanish, like most of his contemporaries, but his Portuguese is as Latinised as he could make it, and he even calls his poetical works, Poemas Lusitanos. Sá de Miranda had philosophized in the familiar redondilha, introduced the epistle and founded the comedy of learning. It was the beginning of a revolution, which Ferreira completed by abandoning the traditional peninsular verse forms for the Italian hendecasyllable, and by composing the noble and austere Roman poetry of his letters, odes and elegies. It was all done of set purpose, for he was a reformer conscious of his mission and resolved to carry it out. The gross realism of the popular poetry, its lack of culture and its carelessness of form, offended his educated taste, and its picturesqueness and ingenuity made no appeal to him.
