= Pierre Rémond de Sainte-Albine =

French historian and playwright (1699–1778)

- Born: 29 May 1699; Paris, France
- Died: 9 October 1778 (aged 79); Paris, France
- Occupations: Historian, playwright

Pierre Rémond de Sainte-Albine (29 May 1699 – 9 October 1778) was an 18th-century French historian and playwright.

He collaborated with L'Europe savante, the Gazette de France (1733–1749 and 1751) and the Mercure de France magazine of which he was chief editor for a time.

== Works ==
- 1716: L'Amante difficile ou l'Amant constant, comedy in five acts and in prose, with Antoine Houdar de La Motte, presented at the Théâtre of the Hôtel de Bourgogne 17 October (impr. 1726, réimpr. 1729, 1732)
- 1747: Le Comédien, two parts, (réimpr. 1749 and 1825] following Molé's Mémoires
- 1749: La Convention téméraire, comedy in one act
- 1749: L'Amour au village
- 1759: Abrégé de l'Histoire de De Thou, with observations

== Sources ==
- Cardinal Georges Grente (dir.), Dictionnaire des lettres françaises. Le XVIIIe, nouvelle édition revue et mise à jour sous la direction de François Moureau, Paris, Fayard, 1995

== Bibliography ==
- Gloria Höckner: Der Gefühlsschauspieler – Eine Schauspieltheorie von Pierre Remond de Sainte-Albine. GRIN Verlag, München 2008, ISBN 978-3-640-11731-4
- Gotthold Ephraim Lessing: Auszug aus dem „Schauspieler“ des Herrn Rémond von Sainte Albine., In: Theatralische Bibliothek, 1. Stück, Berlin: Christian Friederich Voss, 1754.
- Pierre Rémond de Sainte-Albine: Le Comédien, in two volumes, Paris, 1747.
- Peter Heßelmann: Gereinigtes Theater? - Dramaturgie und Schaubühne im Spiegel deutschsprachiger Theaterperiodika des 18. Jahrhunderts (1750–1800), Frankfurt am Main: Vittorio Klostermann GmbH, 2002.

== See also ==
- List of French playwrights
