= Joseph Barret =

English businessman and theological writer

- Born: 1665
- Died: 1699 (aged 33–34)

Joseph Barret (1665–1699) was an English businessman and theological writer.

== Biography ==
Barret was the son of John Barret, a nonconformist minister at Nottingham, and was born at Sandivere, Derbyshire, 2 August 1665. He was educated at Nottingham, where, from the sobriety of his ways, the boys called him "good man". His parents wished him to be apprenticed in London, but he preferred remaining at Nottingham, where he married Millicent, daughter of John Reyner, sometime fellow of Emmanuel College, Cambridge. He appears to have prospered in business, and to have been remarkable from childhood for his consistent piety. He died 28 August 1699.

== Works ==
His Remains (London, 1700), include an account of his religious experiences, occasional meditations, letters, and a brief character of him by his father.

== Family ==
Five children survived their father.
