= François de Chennevières =

French poet and librettist

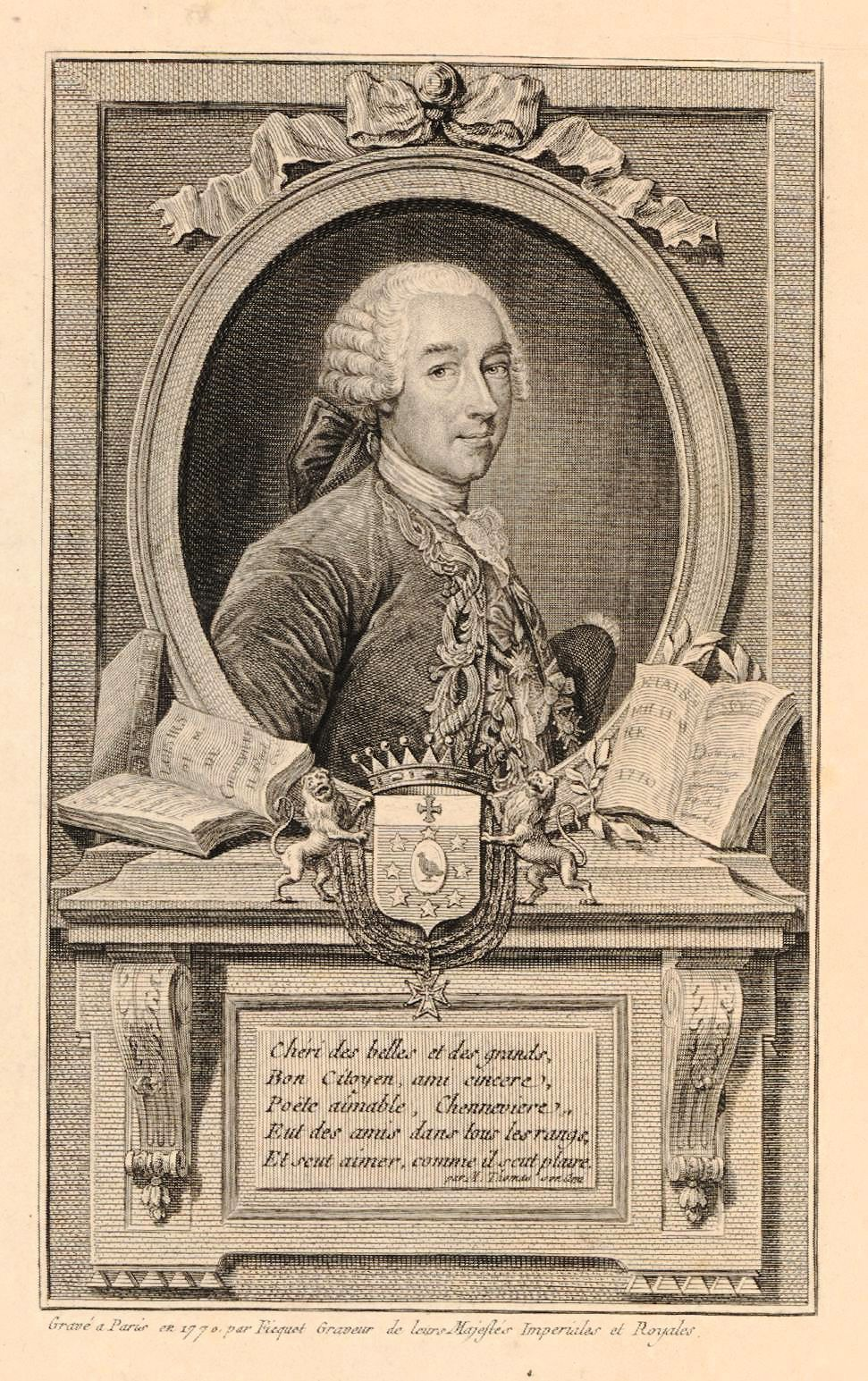
Printed portrait of Francois de Chennevieres (1770)

François de Chennevières (22 November 1699 in La Rochefoucauld – 13 November 1779) was an 18th-century French poet and librettist.

Among other works, Chennevières authored a collection of poems, the Loisirs de M. de C*** (The Hague, Neaulme, 1764 2 vol. in-18). We also owe him Célime, ou le Temple de l'indifférence détruit par l'amour, ballet in one act presented by the Académie royale de musique 28 September 1756 (Paris, aux dépens de l'Académie, Vve Delormel et fils, 1756). He also wrote Détails militaires dont la connoissance est nécessaire à tous les officiers et principalement aux commissaires des guerres (Paris, P.-J. Mariette, 1742, 2 vol. in-12).

His portrait was engraved by Étienne Ficquet. He was close to Voltaire with whom he exchanged correspondence as well as with Moncrif, Fontenelle, Marmontel and Gentil-Bernard.

== Sources ==
- Hippolyte Fournier, Mémoires de Mme Du Hausset, Paris, Flammarion, 1891, (p. 32).
