= Nicolas de Péchantré =

French playwright and poet

Nicolas de Péchantré, or Péchantrés (1638, in Toulouse – December 1708, in Paris) was a 17th-century French playwright and poet.

== Biography ==
The son of a surgeon, he studied and perhaps exercised medicine for a while. He composed poems, which were crowned three times by the Académie des Jeux floraux. Encouraged by this success, he moved to Paris where he settled in order to try his luck in the theatre of the capital

He showed his first tragedy, Géta, to the comedian Baron, who spoke ill of it while offering to buy it for 200 francs. Comedian Champmeslé, who also read the play, then lend the author the money to have it printed. The play was given with success at the Théâtre-Français, where Péchantré had two other tragedies presented afterward, then two more at collège d'Harcourt.

Nicolas of Péchantré died at the age of 70, as he was finishing to compose an opera entitled Amphion et Parthénopée.

His name is linked to an anecdote often told in France as in England. While working in an inn, he forgot a sheet of paper on which he had scribbled: "Here the king will be killed." The innkeeper ran to notify the district commissioner who asked to inform him if that person returned, which happened soon. At the moment, holding in his hand the paper, the commissioner was about to arrest him but Péchantré exclaimed:

Ah! Sir, I am delighted to find this paper I searched for days! This is the scene where I have to put Nero's death in a tragedy on which I work.

True or false, a century later this anecdote would provide Charles-Augustin de Bassompierre the subject of a little comedy, Péchantré, ou une scène de tragédie.

Georges Vicaire also attributed de Péchantré a "satiri-burlesque" comedy, Les Yvrongnes, published in 1687, and we know of another tragedy, Virginie, published under his name in 1690.

== Works ==
- Géta, tragedy in five acts and in verse, Paris, Théâtre-Français, 29 January 1687
- Jugurtha, roi de Numidie, tragedy in 5 acts and in verse, Paris, Théâtre des Fossés-Saint-Germain, 17 December 1692 [unprinted]
- La Mort de Néron, tragedy in five acts, Paris, Théâtre-Français, 21 February 1703
- Joseph vendu par ses frères, tragedy, Paris, Collège d'Harcourt [unprinted]
- Le Sacrifice d'Abraham, tragedy, Paris, Collège d'Harcourt [unprinted]
- Amphion et Parthénopée, opera, 1708 [neither shown nor printed]
