= David Renaud Boullier =

Dutch Protestant minister and philosopher

- Born: 24 March 1699; Utrecht, Netherlands
- Died: 23 December 1759 (aged 60); Utrecht, Netherlands
- Occupations: Minister, philosopher

David Renaud Boullier (24 March 1699 – 23 December 1759) was a Dutch Huguenot theologian, Protestant minister and philosopher.

== Biography ==
Boullier was born in Utrecht on 24 March 1699. He was educated at Utrech University. He was a Protestant pastor in Amsterdam and was active in London for several years.

Boullier was elected in 1721 to the Castle Street Church in London and was ordained by Edmund Gibson in 1723. He remained in England until 1734 when he was appointed minister of Walloon Church, Amsterdam (1734–1749). He returned to Walloon Church in London and in 1751 retired in Utrecht.

Boullier strongly opposed Pyrrhonian skepticism. He was one of the few European thinkers who respected George Berkeley's immaterialism. Boullier was not an advocate of Berkeley's immaterialism but had a warm admiration and friendship with Berkeley. Boullier never criticized Berkeley but did occasionally point out their differences. Boullier respected Berkeley's metaphysics and his arguments against materialism, skepticism and irreligion of the age. He translated Berkeley's Siris, a book that endorsed the therapeutic use of tar water.

Boullier died on 23 December 1759 in Utrecht.

== Animal souls ==
Boullier opposed the mechanistic philosophy of René Descartes that animals were machines devoid of a soul, reason or sensation. He also opposed the skepticism of Pierre Bayle which attempted to eliminate any essential distinction between humans and animals. Boullier believed that God had created animal and human souls with distinct properties.

In 1728, Boullier authored the two volume Essai Philosophique sur L'ˆAme des Bêtes (Essay on the Soul of Beasts), an early work on animal rights. The book was the longest and most thoughtful discussion on animals souls in the 18th century. He argued that animals have purposeful motions which proves they have intelligence and an immaterial soul, though on a lesser scale than humans. Boullier used evidence from comparative anatomy of the brain and from instinct to argue that animals have emotion and sensation but lack the understanding and will of human souls. He stated that animals have within them a "sensitive principle" which is essentially immaterial.

Unlike Richard Dean and others who argued that animals possess immortal souls, Boullier did not believe animal souls were immortal. He stated that animals do suffer and they are innocent but their soul can only act through their body and perish with it. Boullier invoked the great chain of being to link every creature into a united whole to manifest God's purpose. He argued that animal bodies on the lower chain are used for the spiritual happiness of the beings higher on the chain and that their deaths are sometimes necessary to promote this happiness in the created hierarchical world but this excuses only purposive cruelty such as meat eating, not deliberate cruelty.

== Selected publications ==
- Essai Philosophique sur L'ˆAme des Bêtes (1728, 1737)
- Lettres Sur Les Vrais Principes De La Religion (1741)
