= Société du bout du banc =

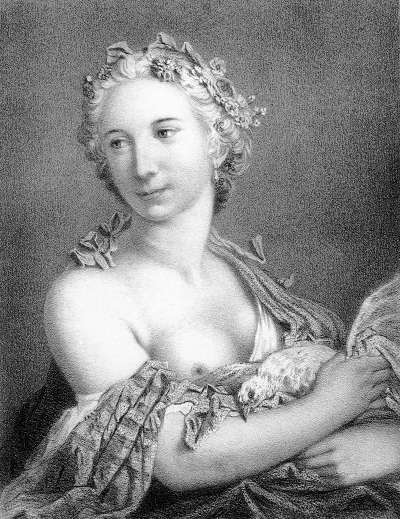
Jeanne Quinault

The Société du bout du banc (French pronunciation: [sɔsjete dy bu dy bɑ̃]), hosted by Jeanne Quinault, was one of the most famous literary salons of the 18th century in France.

Miss Quinault gave dinners at home, rue Sainte-Anne and later rue d'Anjou in Paris, where the best nobility was put on the same footing as poets and artists.

These dinners were held on Mondays, inviting members of French high society including Maurepas, Honoré-Armand de Villars, the Duke of Lauragais, the duke of Orléans, the Grand Prieur d’Orléans, the marquis de Livry, Antoine de Ferriol de Pont-de-Veyle – and hommes and femmes de lettres such as Caylus, Duclos, Voltaire, Piron, D'Alembert, Voisenon, Rousseau, Grimm, Diderot, Lagrange-Chancel, Collé, Moncrif, Grimod de La Reynière, Crébillon fils, Marivaux, Saint-Lambert, Fagan de Lugny, l’abbé de La Marre, the chevalier Louis Caron-Destouches, Pierre-Thomas-Nicolas Hurtaut, Françoise de Graffigny...

Ultimately, the company became so numerous that the dinners had to stand out. Philosophers expelled the poets, gaiety vanished, and the company was dissolved.

== Bibliography ==
- Hellegouarc’h Jacqueline, Un atelier littéraire au XVIIIe siècle : la société du bout-du-banc, Revue d'Histoire Littéraire de la France, 2004, n° 1, p. 59-70 (online).
- Hellegouarc’h Jacqueline, Ces messieurs du bout-du-banc : L’Eloge de la paresse et du paresseux est-il de Marivaux ?, Revue d'Histoire Littéraire de la France, 2002, n° 3, p. 455-459 (online).
