= Françoise de Graffigny =

French novelist, playwright, and salon hostess (1695–1758)

Françoise d'Issembourg d'Happoncourt, Madame de Graffigny
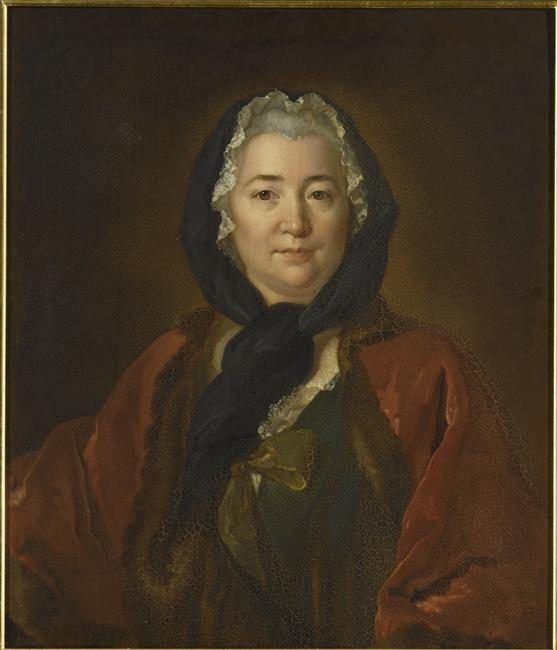
- Madame de Graffigny
- Born: 11 February 1695; Nancy, Duchy of Lorraine
- Died: 12 December 1758 (aged 63); Paris, France
- Title: Madame de Graffigny

Françoise de Graffigny (née Françoise d'Issembourg du Buisson d'Happoncourt; 11 February 1695 – 12 December 1758), better known as Madame de Graffigny, was a French novelist, playwright and salon hostess.

Initially famous as the author of Lettres d'une Péruvienne, a novel published in 1747, she became the world's best-known living woman writer after the success of her sentimental comedy Cénie in 1750. Her reputation as a dramatist suffered when her second play at the Comédie-Française, La Fille d'Aristide, was a flop in 1758, and even her novel fell out of favor after 1830. From then until the last third of the twentieth century, she was almost forgotten, but thanks to new scholarship and the interest in women writers generated by the feminist movement, Françoise de Graffigny is now regarded as a significant French writer of the eighteenth century.

== Early life, marriage, and widowhood in Lorraine ==
Françoise d'Issembourg d'Happoncourt was born in Nancy, in the duchy of Lorraine. Her father, François d'Happoncourt, was a cavalry officer. Her mother, Marguerite Callot, was a great-niece of the famous Lorraine artist Jacques Callot. While she was still a girl, her family moved to Saint-Nicolas-de-Port, where her father was commander of the duke of Lorraine's horse guards.

On 19 January 1712, not yet seventeen years old, Mademoiselle d'Happoncourt was married in the church of Saint-Nicolas-de-Port to François Huguet, a young officer in the duke's service. He was a son of the wealthy mayor of Neufchâteau, Jean Huguet. Like her father, he was an écuyer or squire, the lowest rank of nobility. In honor of the marriage, the groom received from his father the estate at Graffigny and the couple took the title "de Graffigny" as their name. On her side, the bride received a large house inherited by her mother from Jacques Callot, situated in Villers-lès-Nancy, where the couple lived for about six years.

François de Graffigny seemed to have a promising future, and the couple produced three children within five years: Charlotte-Antoinette (born June 1713, died December 1716); Jean-Jacques (born March 1715, lived only a few days) and Marie-Thérèse (born March 1716, died December 1717). But he was a gambler, drunk and wife-beater, who was jailed for domestic violence. In 1718, deeply in debt and already living apart, the Graffignys signed a document, which gave her authority to deal with the family's finances and required him to leave Lorraine for Paris. In 1723 she obtained a legal separation. He died in 1725, under mysterious circumstances. As a widow, Françoise de Graffigny was free from her brutal husband, but she never fully recovered from the financial losses or the emotional trauma of her marriage.

Françoise de Graffigny's mother died in 1727, and her father remarried just months afterward, and moved to a remote town in Lorraine, where he too died in 1733, leaving his daughter free of all family obligations. By that date, the court of Lorraine had moved to Lunéville, where she lived with the support of the duke's widow, the dowager duchess and regent, Élisabeth Charlotte d'Orléans. There she met a dashing cavalry officer, Léopold Desmarest, thirteen years her junior, whose father Henry Desmarest was in charge of the court's music; around 1727 he and Françoise de Graffigny began a passionate affair which lasted until 1743. She also met an even younger man, François-Antoine Devaux, who had trained to become a lawyer but dreamed of being a writer; known to everyone as Panpan, he became her closest friend and confidant, and in 1733 they began a correspondence that continued until her death. This idyllic period came to an end in 1737, when duke François-Étienne de Lorraine ceded his duchy to France to obtain French support for his marriage to Maria Theresa of Austria. Françoise de Graffigny's friends and protectors were dispersed and she herself had nowhere to go.

== From Lorraine to Paris ==
Finally in 1738 she arranged to become a companion to the duchesse de Richelieu; this lady had been Marie-Élisabeth-Sophie de Lorraine, princesse de Guise, before her marriage in April 1734. Françoise de Graffigny planned to join them in Paris in spring 1739, but she needed to bridge the winter months, and wheedled an invitation to Cirey, the château where Émilie, marquise du Châtelet, had been living since 1734 with her lover, Voltaire.

The journey from Lunéville to Cirey took two and half months; she stopped at Commercy, where the dowager duchess of Lorraine and her court had moved into the famous château, and at Demange-aux-Eaux she stayed with a friend, the marquise de Stainville, mother of the future duc de Choiseul. Her two-month stay at Cirey has been the best-known part of her life, because the thirty-odd letters she wrote about it to Devaux were published in 1820. The letters were, however, inaccurately transcribed, severely cut, revised and in fact added to by the anonymous 1820 editor. He or she inserted anecdotes and witticisms to make Voltaire seem more illustrious, and took every opportunity to show Françoise de Graffigny as a sentimental, foolish and irresponsible gossip.

"The first few weeks at Cirey seemed like a wonderful dream come true". Voltaire read from his works in progress and joined in performances of his plays. The hostess, Émilie, showed off her estate, her furnishings, her clothes and jewelry, and her formidable learning. There were constant visitors, including luminaries like the scientist-philosopher Pierre Louis Maupertuis. The conversation ranged over every topic imaginable, always enlivened by Voltaire's sparkling wit.

Yet trouble was brewing. Voltaire read from his scandalous burlesque poem about Joan of Arc, La Pucelle. Émilie intercepted a letter from Devaux which mentioned the work, leapt to the false conclusion that her guest had copied a canto and circulated it, and accused her of treachery. For a month after that, Françoise de Graffigny was a virtual prisoner at Cirey, until her lover Desmarest passed through en route to Paris and took her on the final leg of her journey.

== Paris ==
Her plan to live as companion to the duchesse de Richelieu worked only for a short time, because the duchess died of tuberculosis in August 1740. She then lived as a boarder in two convents, and stayed with a wealthy friend. Finally, in autumn 1742, she rented her own house on the rue Saint-Hyacinthe.

These first years in Paris were difficult, but not unproductive. She began to make new friends, the most important being the actress Jeanne Quinault, who retired from the stage in 1741, and began to receive her friends from the literary world at casual dinners, called the "Bout-du-Banc". Through Jeanne Quinault, Françoise de Graffigny met most of the authors writing in Paris in this era – Louis de Cahusac, Claude Crébillon, Charles Collé, Philippe Néricault Destouches, Charles Pinot Duclos, Barthélemy-Christophe Fagan, Jean-Baptiste-Louis Gresset, Pierre de Marivaux, François-Augustin de Paradis de Moncrif, Pierre-Claude Nivelle de La Chaussée, Alexis Piron, Claude Henri de Fuzée de Voisenon, and others – as well as nobles who enjoyed their company and dabbled in writing themselves, like comte de Caylus, comte de Maurepas, duc de Nivernais, comte de Pont-de-Veyle, and comte de Saint-Florentin. Her lover Desmarest was away much of the time with his regiment, and was trapped in the besieged city of Prague in late 1741; when he returned to Paris without funds to re-equip himself, he accepted money from his mistress even though he had already decided to leave her. The emotional shock of his betrayal never fully healed, but his departure left her free to pursue her own ambitions.

She moved into her new house on 27 November 1742. In the summer of 1743 she sublet an upper floor apartment to Pierre Valleré, a lawyer, and had a brief but intense fling with him, the only liaison besides Desmarest she mentions in her letters. Although relations between them were often strained, he remained with her, as her lodger, legal adviser, and companion, until her death; and he was the principal executor of her will. Her finances remained a problem; in 1744 she staked her hopes on an investment that proved unsound, and she found herself in early 1746 deeper in debt than ever.

== Writer ==
Yet this was the time when she began the work that would eventually bring her fame and material comfort, if not wealth. As early as 1733, her letters to Devaux mention writing projects, some his, some joint, and some hers. When she went to Paris, she carried with her several of her manuscripts, including a sentimental drama called L'Honnête Homme (The Honest Man), an allegorical comedy called La Réunion du Bon-sens et de l'Esprit (The Reunion of Common Sense and Wit), and a verse comedy called Héraclite, prétendu sage (Heraclitus, alleged sage). In her letters she also mentions a traditional comedy called L'École des amis (The School for friends), a fantastic comedy called Le Monde vrai (The Truthful World) and a short supernatural novel called Le Sylphe (The Sylph). None of these works was ever published, and some of them were destroyed, but others survive in manuscript or in fragments among her papers.

Her fellow participants at Jeanne Quinault's Bout-du-Banc insisted that she contribute a piece to their next collective work. Comte de Caylus gave her the outline of a "nouvelle espagnole", a type of short fiction in vogue since the seventeenth century, which she developed on her own. The volume appeared in March 1745, with the title Recueil de ces Messieurs (Anthology by these Gentlemen); her story was called Nouvelle espagnole ou Le mauvais exemple produit autant de vertus que de vices (Spanish novella, or A bad example leads to as many virtues as vices). Françoise de Graffigny's contribution was singled out for praise. This success encouraged her to accept another task from Caylus, the outline of a fairy tale with the title La Princesse Azerolle, published later in 1745 in a collection called Cinq Contes de fées (Five Fairy Tales). Although several of her friends knew of her authorship, La Princesse Azerolle was never publicly attributed to Françoise de Graffigny until the recent publication of her correspondence.

Her confidence restored with the two short stories, she began writing two more substantial works, an epistolary novel, published in December 1747 as Lettres d'une Péruvienne (Letters from a Peruvian Woman), and a sentimental comedy, staged in June 1750 as Cénie. The inspiration for the novel came from seeing a performance of Alzire, Voltaire's play set during the Spanish conquest of Peru; immediately afterwards, in May 1743, she began to read the Inca Garcilaso de la Vega's History of the Incas, which supplied most of the historical background for her story. She was also following Montesquieu's device of a foreign visitor in France as in the Lettres Persanes (Persian Letters). Her novel was an immediate success with readers; by the end of 1748 there were fourteen editions, including three of an English translation. Over the next hundred years, more than 140 editions appeared, including an edition in 1752 revised and expanded by the author, several different English translations, two in Italian, and others in German, Portuguese, Russian, Spanish, and Swedish.

After the success of Lettres d'une Péruvienne, Françoise de Graffigny was a celebrity. Thanks largely to her fame, she found new protectors, and her financial situation improved. With renewed energy and self-assurance, she turned her attention to her play, Cénie. Its composition was more complicated than that of the novel, because she consulted more friends, and getting a work staged required more steps than getting a manuscript published. The premiere took place on 25 June 1750; the play was an instant hit. Measured by the number of first-run performances, the number of spectators, and the box office receipts, it was one of the ten most successful new plays of the eighteenth century in France. It was helped by the novelty of having a woman as author, and by the vogue of comédie larmoyante (tear-jerking comedy). It was revived several times in the next few years, but quickly faded from the repertory. The author's reputation was damaged by the failure of her second play, La Fille d'Aristide (Aristides' Daughter), which was withdrawn soon after its premiere on 27 April 1758.

== Salon hostess ==
Madame de Graffigny's fame also made her house a popular place for social gatherings, and she was one of the important salon hostesses in mid-century Paris. She was assisted by the presence of her cousin's daughter, Anne-Catherine de Ligniville, a charming young woman whose high nobility and low wealth seemed to condemn her to a convent or a marriage of convenience. Françoise de Graffigny brought her from a provincial convent to Paris in September 1746, and played a major role in arranging her love-match marriage to the financier philosopher Claude Adrien Helvétius on 17 August 1751. Earlier that same summer, she moved from her house on the rue Saint-Hyacinthe to another on the rue d'Enfer, with an entrance into the Luxembourg Garden. Here she received her friends, visitors from all over Europe, and many of the most famous French writers and political figures of the era, including d'Alembert, Diderot, Fontenelle, Montesquieu, Prévost, Jean-Jacques Rousseau, Turgot, and Voltaire.

She died peacefully at home in Paris on 12 December 1758, after suffering a seizure while playing cards with three old friends. She had been in failing health for a long time. It took Valleré and others ten years to settle her estate; she left many debts, but in the end her assets covered them all. Her relations with Devaux had cooled over the years, and their correspondence was interrupted by quarrels several times in the 1750s; nevertheless, she continued to write to him until the eve of her death. Although he never undertook the project of editing their letters, a fantasy they had often discussed, he preserved the collection of their letters and her manuscripts. Most of the collection is now in the Beinecke Rare Book and Manuscript Library at Yale University, and other parts of it are in the Morgan Library in New York and the Bibliothèque nationale de France. Beginning in 1985, a team headed by J. A. Dainard has been publishing her letters for the first time. They may well prove to be her most important work, because of her insider's view of French literary life in the heyday of the Age of Enlightenment, her unprecedentedly detailed and intimate account of a woman's life in eighteenth-century France, and her lively colloquial style.

== Name ==
As explained above, "Graffigny" is not a family name, but the name of an estate. Spelling was not standardized in the eighteenth century, and one finds the name written and printed many ways. The author herself usually wrote it "Grafigny". As the Lorraine scholar Georges Mangeot pointed out long ago, however, the place name has been standardized as "Graffigny" (it is now part of Graffigny-Chemin), and that spelling should be followed.

== Works ==
=== Published works ===
- Nouvelle espagnole ou Le mauvais exemple produit autant de vertus que de vices, in Recueil de ces Messieurs, 1745.
- La Princesse Azerolle, in Cinq Contes de fées, 1745.
- Lettres d'une Péruvienne, 1747; revised edition, 1752.
- Cénie, 1750.
- La Fille d'Aristide, 1758.
- Ziman et Zenise, written 1747, staged for the Imperial family in Vienna in October 1749, published in Œuvres posthumes, 1770.
- Phaza, written 1747, staged in the private theater at Berny, March 1753, published in Œuvres posthumes, 1770.
- La Vie privée de Voltaire et de Mme Du Châtelet, letters from Cirey written 1738–39, published with letters by other correspondents, 1820.
- Les Saturnales, written in 1752, staged for the Imperial family in Vienna in October 1752, published in English Showalter, Madame de Graffigny and Rousseau: Between the Two Discours. Studies on Voltaire 175, 1978, pp. 115–80.
- Correspondance de Madame de Graffigny, ed. J. A. Dainard et al., Oxford: Voltaire Foundation, 1985--. Volumes 1–15 in print in 2016.
- Madame de Graffigny: Choix de lettres, ed. English Showalter. "Vif". Oxford: Voltaire Foundation, 2001.

=== Unpublished works (partial list) ===
- Les Pantins, play submitted to the Comédie-Italienne in 1747; rejected; never published; only fragments survive.
- Besides the early works mentioned in the article above, Françoise de Graffigny wrote several short plays to be performed by the children of Maria Theresa of Austria and her husband, the Emperor François-Étienne of Lorraine. They include Ziman et Zenise and Les Saturnales, published posthumously, and also L'Ignorant présomptueux, 1748, and Le Temple de la vertu, 1750, of which full texts survive in manuscript. An unnamed work sent to Vienna in 1753 has not been identified.
- Discourse on the topic "Que l'amour des Lettres inspire l'amour de la Vertu" (The love of literature inspires the love of virtue), submitted for the competition sponsored by the Académie française in 1752; never published; no manuscript known.
- La Baguette, play staged anonymously at the Comédie-Italienne in June 1753; never published; only fragments survive.

=== Works mistakenly attributed to Madame de Graffigny ===
- Several titles, such as Azor and Célidor, have been attributed to Françoise de Graffigny, when they are in fact only the names of characters in her plays, Phaza and L'Ignorant présomptueux, respectively. The César website lists La Brioche and Les Effets de la prévention, which were provisional titles for early versions of La Fille d'Aristide.
- A play titled Le Fils légitime, drame en 3 actes en prose, was published with the address Lausanne: Grasset, in 1771, and attributed by the publisher to Françoise de Graffigny. The publisher does not explain the provenance of the manuscript. There is no mention of the play in the alleged author's correspondence and no manuscript of it among her papers. It is probable that she was not the author, and that the publisher put her name on the titlepage, hoping to capitalize on her reputation.
- The works of Raoul Henri Clément Auguste Antoine Marquis, who was born in 1863 in Graffigny-Chemin, died in 1934, and wrote under the pen name Henry de Graffigny, are sometimes confused with those of Françoise de Graffigny. Henry was immensely prolific, and wrote more than two hundred books, ranging from serious works on aviation, chemistry and engineering for a general audience, to science fiction, adventure stories, and theater. Henry, not Françoise, wrote Culotte rouge.

=== Authors advised and edited by Madame de Graffigny ===
- Jean Galli de Bibiena, Antoine Bret, François-Antoine Devaux, La Rougère, Claude Guimond de La Touche, Michel Linant, Charles Palissot de Montenoy, Jean-François de Saint-Lambert.

== Sources ==
=== Modern editions ===
- Dainard, J. A., ed. Correspondance de Madame de Graffigny. Oxford: Voltaire Foundation, 1985--, in progress.
- Bray, Bernard, and Isabelle Landy-Houillon, eds. Françoise de Graffigny, Lettres d'une Péruvienne. In Lettres Portugaises, Lettres d'une Péruvienne et autres romans d'amour par lettres. Paris: Garnier-Flammarion, 1983. pp. 15–56, 239–247.
- DeJean, Joan, and Nancy K. Miller, eds. Françoise de Graffigny, Lettres d'une Péruvienne. New York: MLA, 1993; revised edition, 2002.
- DeJean, Joan, and Nancy K. Miller, eds. David Kornacker, tr. Françoise de Graffigny, Letters from a Peruvian Woman. New York: MLA, 1993; revised edition, 2002.
- Mallinson, Jonathan, ed. Françoise de Graffigny, Lettres d'une Péruvienne. "Vif". Oxford: Voltaire Foundation, 2002. The best available edition; contains a valuable introduction, shows variants of early editions, and provides supplementary materials in appendices.
- Mallinson, Jonathan, ed. and tr. Françoise de Graffigny, Letters of a Peruvian Woman. "Oxford World classics." Oxford: Oxford University Press, 2009.
- Nicoletti, Gianni, ed. Françoise de Graffigny, Lettres d'une Péruvienne. Bari: Adriatica, 1967.
- Trousson, Raymond, ed. Françoise de Graffigny, Lettres d'une Péruvienne. In Romans de femmes du XVIIIe Siècle. Paris: Laffont, 1996. pp. 59–164.
- Gethner, Perry, ed. Françoise de Graffigny, Cénie. In Femmes dramaturges en France (1650–1750), pièces choisies. Biblio 17. Paris, Seattle, Tübingen: Papers on French Seventeenth Century Literature, 1993. pp. 317–72.

=== Publication history ===
- Smith, D. W. "Graffigny Rediviva: Editions of the Lettres d'une Péruvienne (1967-1993)." Eighteenth-Century Fiction 7, no. 1 (1994): 71–74.
- Smith, D. W. "La Composition et la publication des contes de Mme de Graffigny." French Studies 50 (1996): 275–83.
- Smith, D. W. "The Popularity of Mme de Graffigny's Lettres d’une Péruvienne: The Bibliographical Evidence." Eighteenth-Century Fiction 3, no. 1 (1990): 1-20.
- McEachern, Jo-Ann, and David Smith. "Mme de Graffigny's Lettres d'une Péruvienne: Identifying the First Edition." Eighteenth-Century Fiction 9, no. 1 (1996): 21–35.
- McEachern, Jo-Ann, and David Smith. "The First Edition of Mme de Graffigny's Cénie." The Culture of the Book. Essays from Two Hemispheres in Honour of Wallace Kirsop. Melbourne: Bibliographical Society of Australia and New Zealand, 1999. pp. 201–217.

=== Biography ===
- Showalter, English, Françoise de Graffigny: Her Life and Works, SVEC, 2004:11. The only biography that makes full use of the correspondence.

=== Essays ===
- Mallinson, Jonathan, ed. Françoise de Graffigny, femme de lettres: écriture et réception. SVEC 2004:12. Anthology of articles on Françoise de Graffigny from an Oxford colloquium.
- Porter, Charles A., Joan Hinde Stewart, and English Showalter, eds. "Mme de Graffigny and French epistolary writers of the eighteenth century." Papers from the Yale Symposium of 2–3 April 1999. SVEC 2002:6, pp. 3–116.
- Vierge du Soleil/Fille des Lumières: la Péruvienne de Mme de Grafigny et ses Suites. Travaux du groupe d'étude du XVIIIe siècle, Université de Strasbourg II, volume 5. Strasbourg: Presses Universitaires de Strasbourg, 1989.

=== Bibliography ===
Scores of excellent critical and interpretive articles and chapters in books have been devoted to Françoise de Graffigny and her works in the past thirty years. These surveys provide indications for further reading.

- Davies, Simon. "Lettres d'une Péruvienne 1977-1997: the Present State of Studies." SVEC 2000:05, pp. 295–324.
- Ionescu, Christina. "Bibliographie: Mme de Graffigny, sa vie et ses œuvres." In Jonathan Mallinson, ed. Françoise de Graffigny, femme de lettres: écriture et réception. SVEC 2004:12, pp. 399–414.
- Smith, David. "Bibliographie des œuvres de Mme de Graffigny, 1745-1855." Ferney-Voltaire: Centre international d'étude du XVIIIe siècle, 2016.
