= Dardanus (Rameau) =

1739 opera by Jean-Philippe Rameau

- Tragédie lyrique by Jean-Philippe Rameau
- Title page
- Librettist: Charles-Antoine Leclerc de La Bruère
- Language: French
- Based on: Greek myth of Dardanus
- Premiere: 19 November 1739; Paris Opera

Dardanus is an opera by Jean-Philippe Rameau with a French-language libretto by Charles-Antoine Leclerc de La Bruère. It takes the form of a tragédie en musique in a prologue and five acts. Dardanus premiered at the Paris Opéra on 19 November 1739 to mixed success, mainly because of the dramatic weakness of the libretto. This caused Rameau and La Bruère to rework the opera, completely rewriting the last three acts, for a revival in 1744. Only when Dardanus was again performed in 1760 did it win acclaim as one of Rameau's greatest works.

The original story is loosely based on that of Dardanus, the son of Zeus and Electra, and ancestor of the Trojans. However, in the opera, Dardanus is at war with King Teucer, who has promised to marry his daughter Iphise to King Anténor. Dardanus and Iphise meet through the intervention of the magician Isménor and fall in love. Dardanus attacks a monster ravaging Teucer's kingdom, saving the life of Anténor who is attempting, unsuccessfully, to kill it. Teucer and Dardanus make peace, the latter marrying Iphise.

== Background and performance history ==
=== 1739 premiere ===
Dardanus appeared at a time when the quarrel between Rameau's supporters and those of the operas of Jean-Baptiste Lully had become ever more embittered. Rameau's stage music had been controversial since his debut in 1733 with Hippolyte et Aricie. His opponents - the so-called lullistes - were conservatives who accused him of destroying the French operatic tradition established by Lully under King Louis XIV in the late 17th century. Yet they could not dissuade the Paris Opéra from offering Rameau commissions for new works. Hippolyte had been followed by Les Indes galantes in 1735 and Castor et Pollux in 1737. In 1739 the Opéra commissioned Rameau to write not one but two new scores, the opéra-ballet Les fêtes d'Hébé, which premiered on 21 May, and Dardanus. This could only inflame the controversy and there were many lullistes eager to see Rameau fail.

It is likely that Rameau did not start work on the music of Dardanus until after the premiere of Les fêtes d'Hébé, so that he must have completed it in five months or less. There is some evidence that initially Voltaire had been considered as the librettist for the new opera but he did not have a finished text to hand and so he may have suggested using Dardanus by Leclerc de La Bruère instead. La Bruère was only 23 but he had already written four opera libretti, although none were as lengthy or weighty as Dardanus. From the start critics attacked Dardanus, not for the quality of its verse, but for its dramatic incoherence. They accused La Bruère of stringing together a series of spectacular scenes - magical incantations, a dream sequence, the appearance of a monster - without any regard for dramatic logic and thus creating a hybrid between tragédie en musique and opéra-ballet, a lighter genre in which connection between the acts was of little importance. The drama of two lovers divided because they came from warring nations also resembled the plots of two recent tragédies en musique: Royer's Pyrrhus (1730) and Montéclair's Jephté (1732). Yet, according to the Rameau specialist Sylvie Bouissou, Dardanus suffers in comparison with these models, lacking their dramatic intensity and genuinely tragic endings (in Pyrrhus the heroine kills herself and in Jephté the lover of the title character's daughter is struck down by God).

Dardanus premiered on 19 November 1739 and ran for 26 performances. This meant it was not a great success but neither was it the outright failure for which the Lullistes had hoped. Rameau and La Bruère responded to criticism by making alterations to the work during its first run. Dardanus was soon the target of two parodies: Arlequin Dardanus (premiered at the Comédie-Italienne on 14 January 1740) by Charles-Simon Favart and Jean des Dardanelles by Jean-Baptiste-Louis Gresset (uncertain date, some time in 1739 or 1740).

=== 1744 revision ===
For the next few years after the premiere of Dardanus, Rameau wrote no new operas but made minor revisions to two of his old scores for fresh performances, Hippolyte et Aricie in 1742 and Les Indes galantes in 1743. In 1744 Rameau and La Bruère returned to Dardanus, thoroughly overhauling the drama with the help of Simon-Joseph Pellegrin, who had been the librettist for Hippolyte. The final three acts were completely rewritten. The revised version has a simpler plot, fewer supernatural features and a greater focus on the emotional conflicts of the main characters. It premiered at the Paris Opéra on 23 April 1744.

The 1744 version attracted little notice until it was revived again on 15 April 1760. This time audiences acclaimed it as one of Rameau's greatest works. The cast included Sophie Arnould as Iphise. The set designs in Act 4, by René-Michel Slodtz, imitated Piranesi's famous etchings of imaginary prisons, Carceri d'invenzione. It was revived again in 1768 and 1771 with modifications to the libretto by Nicolas-René Joliveau and to the score by Pierre Montan Berton. Thereafter, it disappeared from the stage until the 20th century, although Nicolas-François Guillard reworked La Bruère's libretto for Antonio Sacchini's Dardanus in 1784.

=== Modern revivals ===
Dardanus was produced a handful of times in the 20th century: in a concert version 1907 at the Schola Cantorum in Paris on 26 April and later the same year at the Opéra de Dijon. In 1934, it was performed in Algiers. In 1980, Raymond Leppard conducted his own hybrid version of the 1739 and 1744 scores at the Paris Opéra. Finally in 1997 and 1998, Marc Minkowski conducted a series of concert performances in Grenoble, Caen, Rennes and Lyon which formed the basis of a Deutsche Grammophon recording in 2000.

The American professional premiere, by the Wolf Trap Opera Company directed by Chuck Hudson, was given in July 2003 at the Wolf Trap National Park for the Performing Arts in suburban Virginia. The opera was also produced in Sydney in November–December 2005, by Pinchgut Opera and the Orchestra of the Antipodes. The Royal Academy of Music also staged Dardanus in London in 2006. In France it was revived again in October–November 2009, at Lille, Caen and Dijon, conducted by Emmanuelle Haïm and staged by Claude Buchvald. In April 2015, the Opéra National de Bordeaux with the Ensemble Pygmalion under Raphaël Pichon performed the 1739 version in the Grand Théâtre de Bordeaux, a production published on video in the following year by Harmonia Mundi. The first performance in England of the 1744 version was given by English Touring Opera on 6 October 2017 at the Hackney Empire Theatre, London.

== Music ==
Modern critics have generally agreed with the complaints of Rameau's contemporaries about the weakness of Dardanus as drama but, musically, they have viewed it as one of the composer's richest scores. Cuthbert Girdlestone rated it alongside Les fêtes d'Hébé for the quality and variety of its music and Graham Sadler has described the 1739 version as, "in musical terms", "without doubt one of Rameau's most inspired creations." These comments echo 18th-century reviewers who remarked that "the work was so stuffed with music [...] that for three whole hours no one in the orchestra had time even to sneeze."

The three major examples of the merveilleux in the 1739 version (Isménor's magic, the dream scene and the monster), though weakening the drama, provided Rameau with the ideal opportunity to show his musical imagination. Act 2 has a magical ceremony including the accompanied recitative Suspends ta brillante carrière, in which Isménor stops the course of the sun, dances for infernal spirits, and a menacing chorus for the magicians, Obéis aux lois d'Enfer, which is almost totally homophonic with one note per syllable. The dream sequence, in which the sleeping hero has a vision, had precedents in earlier French Baroque operas where it was called a sommeil. Rameau produces a succession of arias, dances, trios for the Dreams and symphonies (sections of instrumental music) to evoke a hypnotic state, "at once an inducement to sleep, a berceuse and an impression of sleep." The sea monster comes from a tradition beginning with Lully's Persée in 1682. Rameau had included a similar episode in the fourth act of Hippolyte et Aricie. In Dardanus he blends the monster's music with a tempête, the musical representation of a storm, using broken arpeggios. Girdlestone rated it as one of Rameau's "most sustained tone-pictures, worthy of comparison with the earthquake in Les Indes galantes."

Perhaps the most notable new music in the 1744 version is Dardanus' prison monologue, Lieux funestes, one of Rameau's most famous arias. It is in sombre F minor with obbligato bassoons and "clashing sevenths and ninths" which produce an "excruciating harshness." The 18th-century music critic Pierre-Louis D'Aquin de Châteaulyon saw that the piece was instrumentally, not vocally, conceived and represented a break with the aesthetics of Lully: "Take away the words, and the music no less expresses the accents of suffering and the rigours of a cruel prison. You can change nothing, add nothing, everything is in its place. This is genuine music. The old music was nothing but a shadow of this."

== Roles ==
Role	Voice type	Premiere cast, 1739 version	Cast, 1744 version
Vénus	soprano	Mlle Erémans (also spelled Erremans or Herémans)	Marie Fel
L'Amour (Cupid)	soprano	Mlle Bourbonnais (also spelled Bourbonnois)	Marie-Angélique Coupé
Dardanus, son of Electra and Jupiter	haute-contre	Pierre Jélyotte	Pierre Jélyotte
Iphise, daughter of Teucer	soprano	Marie Pélissier	Cathérine-Nicole Le Maure
Teucer, a king	bass-baritone	François Le Page (also spelled Lepage)	Claude-Louis-Dominique de Chassé de Chinais
Anténor, a king	bass-baritone	M. Albert	François Le Page
Isménor, a magician	bass-baritone	François Le Page	Claude-Louis-Dominique de Chassé de Chinais
Arcas	haute-contre	role not in 1739 version	Jean-Antoine Bérard
A Phrygian man	bass-baritone		
A Phrygian woman	soprano	Marie Fel	Marie Fel
First Dream	soprano	Marie Fel	role cut
Second Dream	haute-contre	Jean-Antoine Bérard	role cut
Third Dream	bass-baritone	Jean Dun, fils	role cut
A Pleasure	soprano		
Retinue of Venus and Cupid, Sports and Pleasures, retinue of Jealousy, people, warriors, magicians, Phrygians, Dreams: choir

Dancing characters
Roles	1739 cast	1744 cast
Act 1 - Phrygian warriors	L. Javillier (a warrior), L. Dallemand (a Phrygian woman)	Dumoulin, Monservin, Mlle Carville
Act 2 - Magicians	C. Maltaire (a magician)	Maltaire, Monservin, Matignon
Act 3 (1739 only): Phrygian people	L. Maltaire and Mlle Mariette (Phrygian man and woman)	not in 1744 version
Act 4 (1739 only): Air spirits	David Dumoulin and Marie Sallé (Dreams)	not in 1744 version
Act 5 (1739 only) - Sports and Pleasures, Charites	Louis Dupré, Matignon, Mlles Le Breton and Barbarine (Sports and Pleasures)	not in 1744 version
Act 3 (1744 version): Phrygian women	not in 1739 version	La Camargo, Mlles Rabon, Carville, Erny, Fremicourt, Dary and Puvigné
Act 4 (1744 version): Spirits in Isménor's entourage	not in 1739 version	Mlle Dallemand, Messieurs Hamoche, Lafeuillade, Levoir and de Visse
Act 5 (1744 version): Graces; A Pleasure; A Shepherdess	not in 1739 version	Mlles Le Breton, Frémicourt and Courcelle; M. Dupré; Mlle Puvigné

== Instrumentation ==
The opera uses an orchestra with the following instrumentation: 2 piccolos, 2 flutes, 2 oboes, 2 bassoons, 2 trumpets, timpani and other percussion, strings (with divided violas), harpsichord.

== Synopsis (1739 version) ==
=== Prologue ===
Scene: Cupid's palace on Cythera.
Cupid and the Graces sing and dance for Venus until Jealousy with her Troubles and Suspicions disrupts the celebrations. Venus orders her followers to bind Jealousy in chains, but freed from Troubles and Suspicions Cupid and his entourage fall asleep and Jealousy is needed to revive them. Venus then prepares to present the story of Dardanus.

=== Act 1 ===
Scene: A place full of mausoleums commemorating Phrygian warriors who have died fighting Dardanus.
In the opening aria Cesse, cruel Amour, de régner sur mon âme, Iphise laments that she is in love with Dardanus, the deadly enemy of her father Teucer, King of the Phrygians. Teucer declares the Phrygians will soon be victorious over Dardanus as he has just sealed an alliance with Prince Anténor. In return, he has promised Iphise to Anténor in marriage. Iphise is not so sure they will defeat Dardanus, the son of the supreme god Jupiter, but the Phrygian people celebrate their predicted triumph anyway. Iphise decides to ask the magician Isménor for help.

=== Act 2 ===
Scene: A solitary place, with a temple in the background.
Isménor sings of his power to foresee the future (Aria: Tout l'avenir est présent à mes yeux). He is astonished when Dardanus arrives; after all, this is the realm of Teucer and thus enemy territory. However, as a priest of Jupiter, Isménor promises to be a faithful friend to the god's son. Dardanus tells him he is in love with Iphise. The magician conjures up spirits and gives Dardanus his magic wand: it will enable him to appear before Iphise in the form of Isménor. Dardanus uses the spell just before Iphise arrives. Thinking she is speaking to Isménor, Iphise confesses she is in love with Dardanus. Dardanus can no longer resist and reassumes his true form. Iphise despairs of their love ever being happy and runs off. Music representing the noise of battle serves as a transition between Act 2 and Act 3.

=== Act 3 ===
Scene: A gallery in Teucer's palace.
The Phrygians have defeated Dardanus in battle and taken him captive, leading Iphise to lament his fate (Aria:Ô jour affreux). Anténor learns that Iphise loves Dardanus not him. The Phrygians celebrate their victory, but the festival is soon interrupted by a furious dragon sent by Neptune. Anténor vows to kill the monster.

=== Act 4 ===
Scene: The seashore, with traces of the ravages of the monster.
Venus rescues Dardanus in her flying chariot. She takes him to the seashore where three Dreams lull him to sleep then rouse him to fight the monster which is ravaging the coast. Anténor confronts the dragon (Monstre affreux, monstre redoutable) but has to be rescued by Dardanus, who kills the monster. Dardanus does not yet reveal who he is to Anténor.

=== Act 5 ===
Scene: Teucer's palace in the background; on one side, the town is visible; on the other, countryside and the sea.
The people think Anténor has saved them (Chorus: Anténor est victorieux), but the king has his doubts. The arrival of Dardanus confirms the true identity of the dragon-slayer. Anténor asks Teucer to allow Dardanus to marry Iphise. The king hesitates until Venus descends from the skies, bringing with her Hymen (god of marriage) and Peace. Iphise and Dardanus sing the duet Des biens que Vénus nous dispense. Cupids and Pleasures dance in celebration and the opera concludes with a monumental chaconne.

== Synopsis (1744 version) ==
The prologue and Acts 1 and 2 are the same as the 1739 version.

=== Act 3 ===
Dardanus has been taken captive in battle. A mob of Phrygians bays for his blood. The jealous Anténor plots with his follower Arcas to kill his rival Dardanus surreptitiously so he can win Iphise's hand at last.

=== Act 4 ===
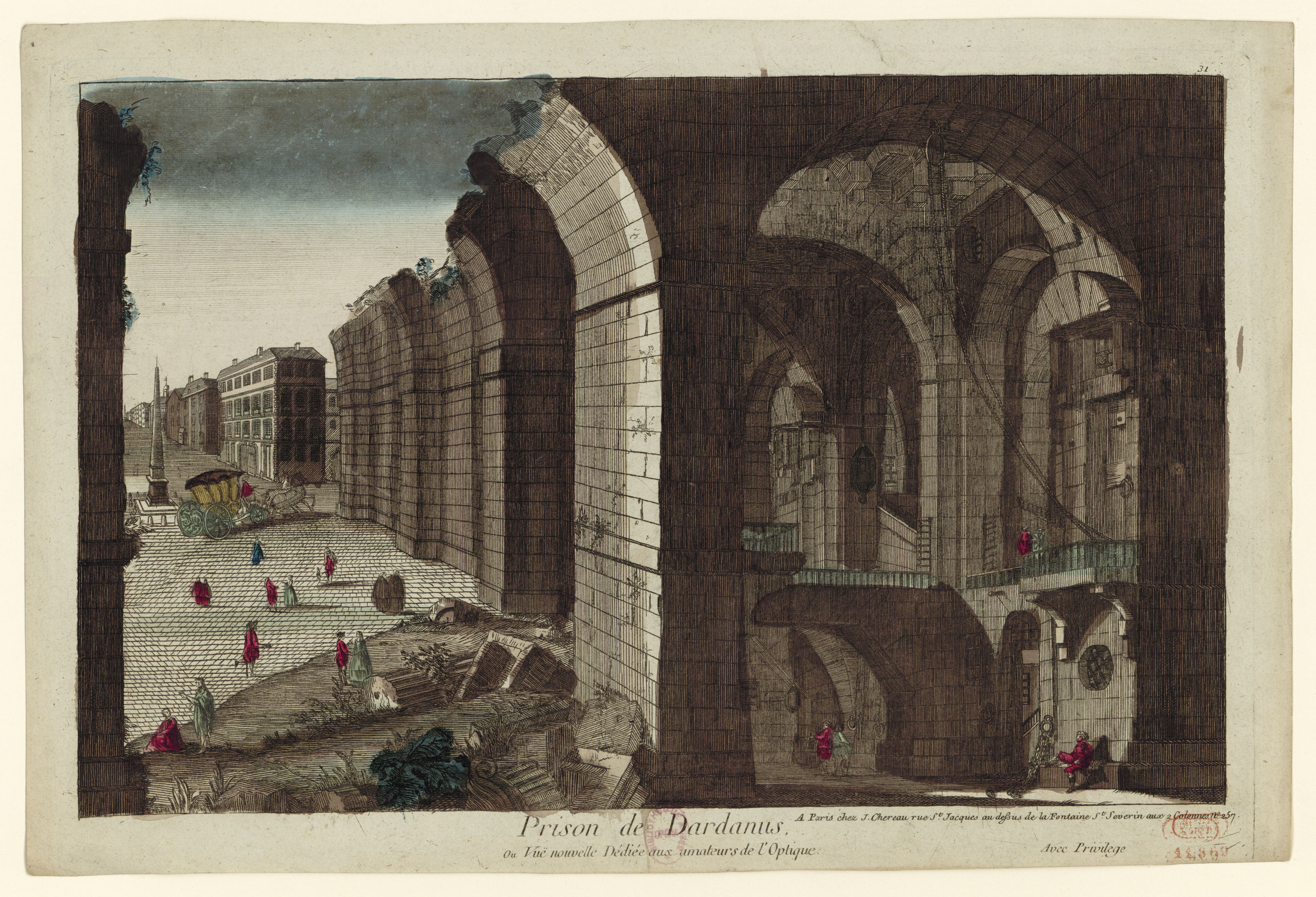
Dardanus' prison

In prison, the despairing Dardanus sings the aria Lieux funestes. Isménor magically appears in the cell and advises Dardanus to pray to Cupid for help. Cupid promises to free Dardanus providing whoever comes to rescue him will sacrifice their life in his stead. Dardanus rejects such terms and when Iphise comes to liberate him he refuses to leave his cell. Anténor arrives and reveals he has freed Dardanus' soldiers to create confusion to allow him to murder Dardanus. Now full of remorse and mortally wounded by the soldiers, he repents the plot and dies. The sacrifice necessary for Dardanus' liberation has been made and he and Iphise are free to leave.

=== Act 5 ===
Dardanus has captured Teucer. He offers him his throne back in return for Iphise's hand in marriage, but the old king still refuses. In despair, Dardanus hands Teucer his sword and asks him to kill him. Teucer is moved by Dardanus' magnanimity and relents. The act ends with Venus descending to celebrate the wedding of Dardanus and Iphise.

== Recordings ==
=== Audio (1739 version) ===
Year	Cast (in the following order: Dardanus, Iphise, Anténor, Teucer, Isménor, Vénus)	Conductor, Chorus, Orchestra	Label, Notes
2000	John Mark Ainsley, Véronique Gens, Laurent Naouri, Russell Smythe, Jean-Philippe Courtis, Mireille Delunsch	Marc Minkowski, Les Musiciens du Louvre	Deutsche Grammophon Archiv (2 CDs), 1739 version with a few additions from 1744 including Lieux funestes
2007	Paul Agnew, Kathryn McCusker, Paul Whelan, Stephen Bennett, Damian Whiteley, Penelope Mills	Antony Walker, Cantillation, Orchestra of the Antipodes	ABC Classics (2 CDs); 1739 version, minus prologue, plus some music from the 1744 score

=== Audio (1744 version) ===
Year	Cast (in the following order: Dardanus, Iphise, Anténor, Teucer, Isménor)	Conductor, Chorus, Orchestra	Label, Notes
2013	Bernard Richter, Gaëlle Arquez, Benoît Arnould, Alain Buet, João Fernandes, Sabine Devieilhe	Raphaël Pichon, Ensemble Pygmalion	Alpha (2 CDs)
2021	Judith van Wanroij, Chantal Santon Jeffery, Cyrille Dubois, Thomas Dolie, Tassis Christoyannis	György Vashegyi, Purcell Choir, Orfeo Orchestra	Glossa (3 CDs)

=== Audio (blend of 1739 and 1744 versions) ===
Year	Cast (in the following order: Dardanus, Iphise, Anténor, Teucer, Isménor)	Conductor, Chorus, Orchestra	Label, Notes
1981	Georges Gautier, Frederica von Stade, Michael Devlin, Roger Soyer, José van Dam, Christiane Eda-Pierre	Raymond Leppard, Chorus and Orchestra of Le Théâtre National de l'Opéra de Paris	Erato (reissued on 2 CDs in 1994), blend of 1739 and 1744 versions with cuts including the whole of the prologue

=== Video (1739 version) ===
Year	Cast (in the following order: Dardanus, Iphise, Anténor, Teucer, Isménor, Vénus)	Conductor, Chorus, Orchestra, Director	Label, Notes
2016	Reinoud van Mechelen, Gaëlle Arquez, Florian Sempey, Nahuel de Pierro (sings both Isménor and Teucer), Karina Gauvin	Raphaël Pichon, Ensemble Pygmalion, Michel Fau	Harmonia Mundi (1 DVD + 1 Blu-Ray)

== Sources ==
- Philippe Beaussant, booklet notes to the Alpha audio recording of Dardanus.
- (in French) Sylvie Bouissou, Jean-Philippe Rameau: Musicien des Lumières (Fayard, 2014)
- Cuthbert Girdlestone, Jean-Philippe Rameau: His Life and Works (originally published 1957; revised edition published by Dover, 1969)
- Graham Sadler, "Jean-Philippe Rameau" in The New Grove: French Baroque Masters (first published 1980; paperback edition Macmillan, 1986)
- Graham Sadler, article on Dardanus in the Viking Opera Guide, ed. Amanda Holden (Viking, 1993)
- (in French) Lajarte, Théodore, Bibliothèque Musicale du Théatre de l'Opéra. Catalogue Historique, Chronologique, Anecdotique, Paris, Librairie des bibliophiles, 1878, Tome I, ad nomen, pp. 191–92 (accessible online for free in Internet Archive)
- Sadler, Graham, Dardanus (i), in Sadie, Stanley (ed.), The New Grove Dictionary of Opera (I, pp. 1077–79), Grove (Oxford University Press), New York, 1997 (ISBN 978-0-19-522186-2)
- (in Italian) Mellace, Raffaele, Dardanus, in Gelli, Piero & Poletti, Filippo (ed.), Dizionario dell'Opera 2008, Milano, Baldini Castoldi Dalai, 2007, pp. 289–290, ISBN 978-88-6073- 184-5 (in Italian)
- (in French) Le magazine de l'opéra baroque page on Dardanus
- Rameau Le Site, Horvallis 2003-2010
- Warrack, John and West, Ewan, The Oxford Dictionary of Opera New York: OUP: 1992 ISBN 0-19-869164-5
