= Le Méchant =

- Act V, Scene IX
- Written by: Jean-Baptiste-Louis Gresset
- Characters: Сléon, the titular villain Сhloé; Valère, Сhloé's lover Florise, Сhloé's mother Géronte, Florise's brother Ariste, Géronte's friend Lisette, lady's maid Frontin, Сléon's manservant A servant
- Original language: French
- Genre: comedy

Premiere
- Date premiered: April 15, 1747
- Place premiered: Comédie-Française

Le Méchant (French: The Villain) is a 1747 play by Jean-Baptiste-Louis Gresset. It is considered the best verse comedy of the eighteenth-century French stage.

Like Tartuffe (and Destouches's Ingrat and Médisant), the title character, Сléon, schemes to gain his provincial host's money and marry his female relatives - here, Géronte's sister and niece rather than his daughter. Сléon, who thinks the height of pleasure is to be both feared and desired, persuades Valère not to marry Сhloé and promises to marry Florise, but is eventually exposed by the wise Ariste and the clever Lisette, who enlist his manservant Frontin in support of their cause.

Madame de Pompadour, having promised Gresset that she would put on the play at her theatre, did so on February 6, 1748. She played Lisette, while the Duc de Chartres played Géronte and the Duc de Nivernais played Valère.

Several lines in Les Liaisons dangereuses refer or allude to Le Méchant: Madame de Merteuil quotes Cléon's "Les sots sont ici-bas pour nos menus plaisirs" (II.I) in letter 63, citing the play, and Valmont alludes to the same character's "Ma foi, quand je parcours tout ce qui le compose [le monde]/Je ne trouve que nous qui valions quelque chose" (II.III) in letter 100, when he says "En vérité, plus je vais, et plus je suis tenté de croire qu'il n'y a que vous et moi dans le monde, qui valions quelque chose." In 1792, Elizabeth Inchbald adapted the play into the farce Young Men and Old Women.
