= Zaïde, reine de Grenade =

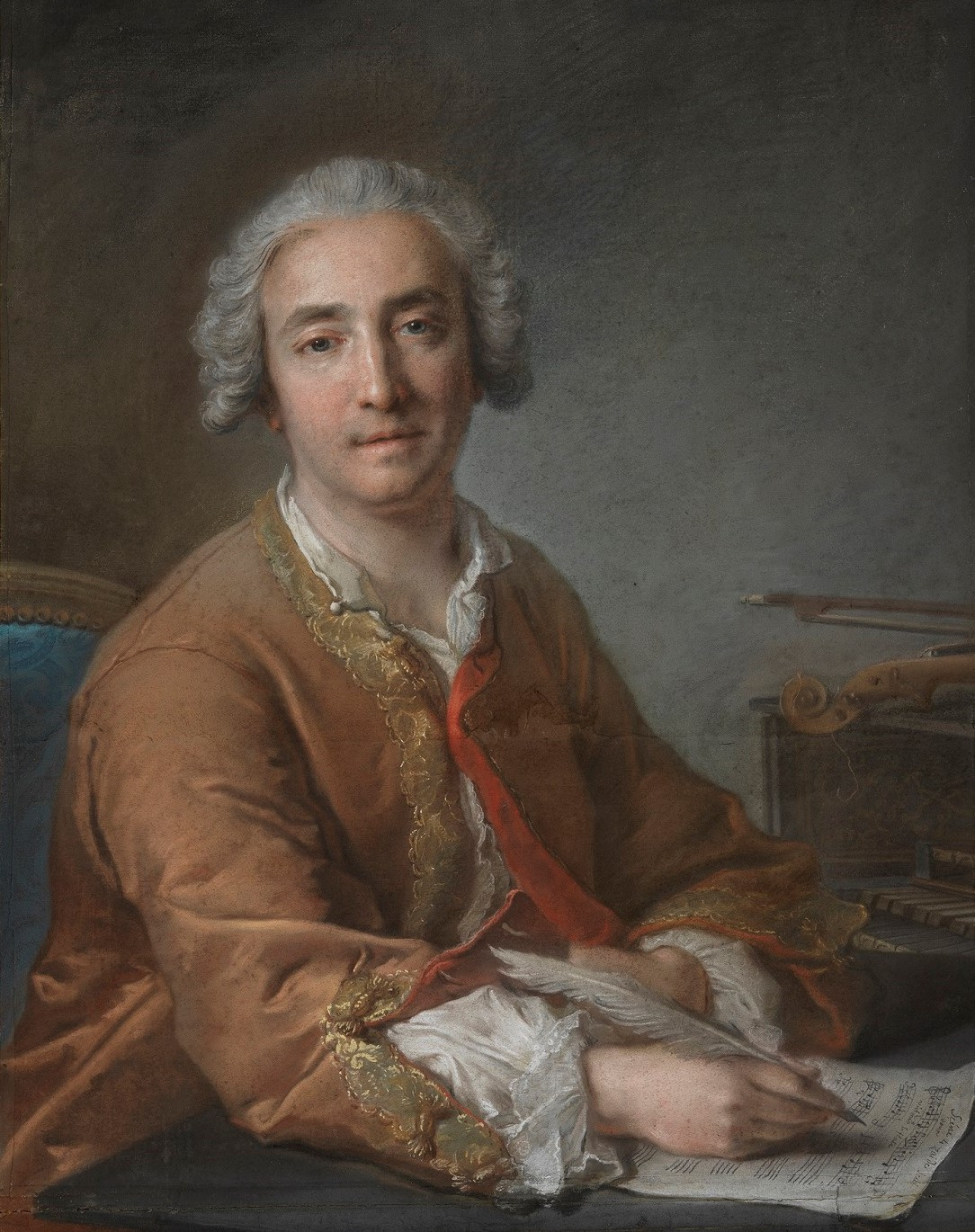
Royer composing Zaïde, by Jean-Marc Nattier, ca.1750)

Zaïde, reine de Grenade (Zaïde, Queen of Grenada) is a ballet-héroïque written by the French Baroque composer Joseph-Nicolas-Pancrace Royer, to a text by the Abbé de La Marre, first performed in 1739.

Royer's "sparse but sensuous orchestral textures with flutes and oboes very prominent" have been praised in Zaïde together with "his exuberant choral writing and his fluid treatment of recitative and aria".

== Performance history ==
Zaïde was first performed, under the direction of the composer, on 3 September 1739 for the wedding of King Louis XV's daughter, when it ran for 44 performances, and was revived for the wedding of the Dauphin in 1745, and again for the wedding of Marie Antoinette in 1770. It has been performed at concert in 2005 in London in a new edition by Lionel Sawkins.

== Roles ==
Roles, voice types, premiere cast
Role	Voice type	Premiere cast, 3 September 1739 Conductor: Royer
Zaïde	soprano	Marie Pélissier
Isabelle	soprano	Eremans
Octave	tenor (haute-contre)	Pierre Jélyotte
Almanzor	tenor (haute-contre)	Denis-François Tribou
Zuléma	baritone	François Le Page
Ballerina		Marie Sallé
Ballerino		Louis Dupré

== Synopsis ==
The plot is quite simple. Queen Zaïde in the Alhambra has to decide between the love of two rival Moorish princes and chooses the good prince.
