= Béatrice du Han de Martigny =

Béatrice du Han de Martigny, Marquise de Meuse (1711-1793), known as Madame de Meuse, was the royal mistress of the regent of the Austrian Netherlands, Charles Alexander of Lorraine.

Béatrice du Han de Martigny was the daughter of a courtier in service of Leopold, Duke of Lorraine, and married marquis François de Choiseul-Meuse (1716-1746). She became acquainted with Charles Alexander during his upbringing in the ducal court of Luneville. In 1760, she joined him in the Austrian Netherlands, and their relationship lasted until the death of Charles Alexander in 1780. Her position led the sister of Charles Alexander, Princess Anne Charlotte of Lorraine, who functioned as the first lady of the court, to criticize him.

She is also known as a correspondent of Françoise de Graffigny.
