= Quinault family =

The Quinault family were French actors, active in the first half of the 18th century.

- Jean Quinault was the father of this family. He was born at Bourges around 1656 or 1658, and died before June 1728. Said to be the son of a doctor from Issoudun, he joined an acting company based in Rouen called the troupe du Dauphin in 1679 and again in 1681. In Amiens in 1686 he married Marie Saintelette, daughter of a baker from Verdun. In March 1694 he and his wife joined the troupe of Leopold, Duke of Lorraine; the following year he auditioned for the Comédie-Française and was accepted for a quarter-share position. Instead of remaining in Paris, however, he returned to Lorraine and headed the duke's troupe from 1695 to 1705. Typically of provincial actors at the time, he led an itinerant life; various documents place him in Boulogne-sur-Mer in 1697; in Metz in 1688, 1698 and 1701; in Verdun in 1693; in Strasbourg in 1699 and 1702, in Nancy in 1699; in Marseille in 1705; and in 1727 in the Electorate of the Palatinate. Jean Quinault is remembered chiefly for his children, almost all of whom learned their craft in their father's troupe and went on to become successful actors. For part of the early 18th century, they dominated the Paris theater.
- Jean-Baptiste-Maurice Quinault, baptized 9 September 1687, died 3 September 1745 in Autry-le-Châtel, near Gien. He made his début at the Comédie-Française in May 1712 and was accepted into the troupe the next month. He played both tragic and comic roles, but was most praised for the latter. He retired from the stage in 1733, returned briefly in 1734, then retired to Autry where he spent the rest of his life.
- Françoise Quinault, born probably in 1688 in Metz, died 22 December 1713 in Paris; also called Mlle Denesle. She made her début at the Comédie-Française in January 1708 and was accepted into the troupe later in the year. She was unhappily married to a would-be actor named Denesle, and in poor health; she died at the age of 25.
- Abraham-Alexis Quinault, born and baptized 9 September 1693 in Verdun, died 12 February 1767 in Paris; called Quinault-Dufresne. He made his début at the Comédie-Française in October 1712 and was accepted the same year. He was handsome and had musical talent. Until his retirement in 1741 he was the principal male star of the troupe in both tragic and comic roles.
- Marie-Jeanne Quinault, born 21 December 1697 in Boulogne-sur-Mer, died 9 November 1793 in Paris; usually called Marie-Anne-Catherine, Marie-Anne-Christine, or Mlle Quinault l'aînée (the elder). She made her début at the Comédie-Française in January 1714 and was accepted into the troupe the next month. She was the most beautiful of the Quinault sisters, but not the most talented, and she played primarily young women in light comedies. She retired very quickly, in 1722, and had a long liaison with the duc de Nevers; there is strong evidence to suggest that they had a child together and contracted a Morganatic marriage.
- Jeanne Quinault, born and baptized 13 October 1699 in Strasbourg, died 18 January 1783 in Paris; usually called Jeanne-Françoise, or Mlle Quinault la cadette (the younger). She made her début at the Comédie-Française in June 1718 and was accepted in December. She was a very popular actress in comic roles, especially the saucy and resourceful Soubrette parts. She was also one of the most intelligent members of the troupe, and is reputed to have advised Voltaire and Pierre-Claude Nivelle de La Chaussée on writing some of their hit plays. After her retirement in 1741, she became the hostess of a famous salon, called the Bout-du-Banc. She took responsibility for her eldest brother's orphaned children after his death in 1745. In 1758, she moved from her Paris apartment to the more rural Saint-Germain-en-Laye, where she lived quietly and corresponded with friends, until failing health led her to return to the city in 1778.
- François Quinault, birth and death dates and places unknown, but recorded as acting in the theaters of the Paris fairs from 1738 to 1742, Valenciennes in 1746, Thionville in 1749, Nancy in 1750, and the troupe of the Prince of Orange in the 1750s

In addition, in 1727 Abraham-Alexis married one of the female stars:

- Catherine-Jeanne Dupré, born about 1705, died 15 July 1767 in Saint-Germain-en-Laye; she was originally called Mlle de Seine, but after her marriage was also called Mlle Dufresne or Mlle Quinault-Dufresne. She made her début in 1724 at Fontainebleau, where the company was performing before the court, and she was accepted into the troupe a few days later. Her marriage and her career were marked by scandals and conflicts, and she retired in 1736 claiming poor health.

And in November 1727, a cousin made her début:

- Marguerite-Marie-Thérèse-Élisabeth Étienne, born 3 August 1701 in Verdun, died 7 September 1746 in Paris, called Mlle Balicourt or de Balicourt. Her mother and Jean Quinault's wife were sisters. She was accepted into the troupe in January 1728, and played the roles of queens and powerful women, but poor health led her to retire in 1738.

== Sources ==
- Judith Curtis, "Divine Thalie": the career of Jeanne Quinault", SVEC 2007:08. This is the definitive work on the Quinault family, focussing on Jeanne Quinault. It draws on all the known collections of Mlle Quinault's unpublished letters, at the Bibliothèque nationale de France, the Bibliothèque-musée de la Comédie-Française and at the Moscow State Historical Museum. It draws on all the standard works of scholarship on French 18th-century theater, and corrects a number of errors in the historical tradition and legends about the Quinault family.
- J. A. Dainard, et al., eds., Correspondance de Mme de Graffigny, Oxford: Voltaire Foundation, 1985--, in progress; 12 vols. in print, vol. 13 due in 2010, edition will be complete in 15 vols. Françoise de Graffigny met Jeanne Quinault in 1740, and regarded the actress as her best friend for the rest of her life. There are no letters to or from Mlle Quinault in this edition, but she is often mentioned, meetings of her salon are described, and her social circle, including her family, are often discussed.
