= Quinault-Dufresne =

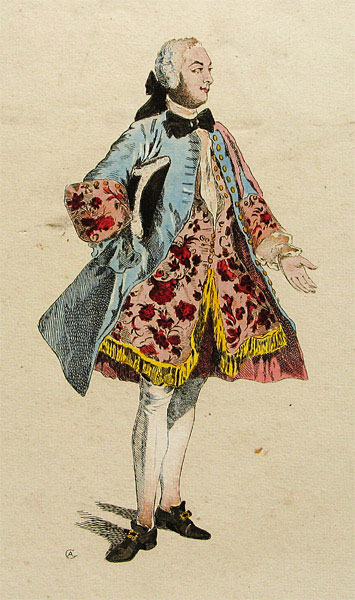
Quinault-Dufresne as the Count of Jupiere in Le Glorieux (1732) by Destouches

Abraham-Alexis Quinault, called Quinault-Dufresne, (9 September 1693 in Verdun, Three Bishoprics – 12 February 1767 in Paris) was a French actor. He was a member of the Quinault family of actors.

He made his début at the Comédie-Française on 7 October 1712, playing Orestes in Électre (1709) by Prosper Jolyot de Crébillon, and was admitted to the company in December. He had striking good looks and musical talent, and he soon took over the male leading roles in both comedy and tragedy, and remained the star of the troupe until his retirement in 1741.

Voltaire asked him to play the title role in his first tragedy, Œdipe, in 1718. The Duchesse de Berry, eldest daughter of the Regent, attended five performances of Voltaire's Oedipe, even though she was pregnant and public rumor attributed her condition to her incestuous relationship with her father. The fecund young widow was said to be attracted to Quinault-Dufresne's beauty, prompting her to defy public opinion and admire the actor's physique. The actor went on to create many roles for Voltaire, including some in his most popular plays: Orosmane in Zaïre (1732), Zamore in Alzire (1736) and Euphémon the son in L'Enfant prodigue (The Prodigal Son, 1736). For Crébillon he created title roles in Rhadamiste et Zénobie (1711) and Pyrrhus (1726), and had starring roles in Antoine Houdar de la Motte's Inès de Castro (1723), Pierre-Claude Nivelle de La Chaussée's Le Préjugé à la mode (1735), and Louis de Boissy's Les Dehors trompeurs, three of the most successful plays of the century. He was always most closely identified with Le Glorieux (The Conceited Count, 1732), a smash-hit comedy written for him by Philippe Néricault Destouches. According to legend, the title character was based on Quinault-Dufresne himself, and he lived up to his reputation by refusing to play the role unless his character won the heroine's heart at the end, and would not even look at the author's last-minute revisions. The story may be apocryphal, but it caught on because it seemed plausible.

Quinault-Dufresne married another star of the Comédie-Française, Catherine-Jeanne Dupré, known in the theater as Mlle de Seine. They signed the marriage contract in Lyon on 20 May 1727, but were already quarreling in the courts by 1730. He retired from the stage in 1741, with a pension from the king as well as the one paid by the company. Little is known of his life after retirement.

His daughter Mme de Maux was a friend, and for some time a lover, of Denis Diderot.
