= Abbé de La Marre =

French choreographer and librettist

The abbé de La Marre (or La Mare) (Quimper, 1708 – Bavaria, 1742) was an 18th-century French homme de lettres. Voltaire was interested in him and gave him some literary works to do. He was a member of the Société du bout du banc hosted by Mlle Quinault.

== Works ==
- 1736: L'Ennui d'un quart d'heure
- 1736: Remarks on La Mort de César by Voltaire
- 1739: Le Je ne sais quoi de vingt minutes, poems
- 1739: Zaïde, reine de Grenade, ballet héroïque, music by Joseph Nicolas Pancrace Royer, given at the Académie royale de musique on 3 September
- 1739: Momus amoureux, one-act ballet, presented on 27 October
- 1753: With Antoine Houdar de La Motte, argument de Titon et l'Aurore, pastorale héroïque, libretto by Claude-Henri de Fusée de Voisenon, music by Jean-Joseph Cassanéa de Mondonville, premiered at the Académie royale de musique on 9 January
- 1766: Les Quarts d'heure d'un joyeux solitaire, (attr.; reimp. 1882 under the title Contes de l'abbé de La Marre, les Quarts d'heure d'un joyeux solitaire)

== Bibliography ==
- Cardinal Georges Grente (dir.), Dictionnaire des lettres françaises. Le XVIIIe siècle, nlle. édition revue et mise à jour sous la direction de François Moureau, Paris, Fayard, 1995.
