= Letters from a Peruvian Woman =

1747 novel by Madame de Graffigny

Lettres from a Peruvian Woman
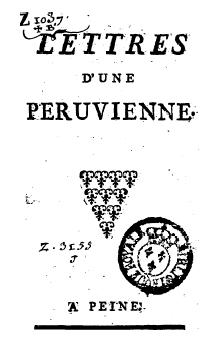
- Title page from first edition of Lettres d'une Péruvienne
- Author: Madame de Graffigny
- Original title: Lettres d'une Péruvienne
- Language: French
- Genre: Epistolary novel
- Publisher: A. Peine
- Publication date: 1747
- Publication place: France
- Media type: Print

Letters from a Peruvian Woman (French: Lettres d'une Péruvienne) is a 1747 epistolary novel by Françoise de Graffigny. It tells the story of Zilia, a young Incan princess, who is abducted from the Temple of the Sun by the Spanish during the Spanish conquest of the Inca Empire. In a series of letters to her fiancé Aza, who is also the Sapa Inca, Zilia tells the story of her capture, her rescue by French sailors, her befriending of the captain Déterville and her introduction to French society.

== Summary of Letters 1 – 9 ==
A Peruvian woman named Zilia wrote letters to her fiance about her turmoil, suffering, and love. In her letters, the woman spends most of the context sharing the strong love she has towards her fiance Aza, the King in the land of the Sun. Zilia shares in her letters about her capture story; that when she was making her way to the sacred temple she saw the Spaniard soldiers who were looked upon as Virachocas killing the native men and capturing the virgins. As Zilia attempted to escape she was captured by the soldiers. Zilia warns Aza to be careful of the people around him because the Spaniards have more followers than Aza and she fears that some of the men around Aza would try to kill him as a favor to the Spaniards. Zilia also complains about her situation in the foreign land and begs her fiance to come and save her with his might. It is during this period that she comes to befriend Déterville, and begins to get to know French culture. Zilia also explains that her heart is filled with curiosity upon her arrival in the foreign land and she does not seem to make a friendly connection with the culture there.

== Summary of Letters to 10-20 ==
As the novel progresses, Zilia comes to know French society better. She comes to stay with Déterville and his sister in their house in Paris while she waits to be reunited with Aza. It is through her connections to these two that Zilia begins to familiarize herself to French society, and reflect on its absurd characteristics, relaying everything she sees to Aza. She is introduced to society to the first time, coming to a gathering of Parisian women who exoticize her and make fun of her. She notes the manners of the French, contrasting them to the way that her native Inca society comports itself. She also critiques the greediness of French society, and notes how this prioritization of wealth leads French society to be superficial.

== Content ==
Like Montesquieu's Lettres persanes, Lettres d'une Péruvienne presents a satirical view of French life, particularly the conditions of French women, through the eyes of an outsider. Zilia talks about language, literature, philosophy, education, and child rearing, among other subjects. To a much greater degree than Montesquieu, Françoise de Graffigny engages readers in a suspenseful story, turning on whether Zilia will be reunited with Aza or whether she will consent to marry Déterville. Many readers and critics were unsatisfied by the conclusion, but when the author revised and expanded the novel for a new edition in 1752, she refused to change the ending.

== Background ==
The inspiration for the novel came from seeing a performance of Alzire, Voltaire's play set during the Spanish conquest of Peru; immediately afterwards, in May 1743, she began to read Inca Garcilaso de la Vega's History of the Incas (in the original, Comentarios Reales de los Incas and La historia general del Perú). It supplied most of the historical background for the story. Although only a small fragment of a manuscript exists, the process of composition can be followed in the author's correspondence.

Jonathan Israel wrote that the Letters "first powerfully concocted the potent late Enlightenment myth of the virtuous and heroic Incas." The "myth" was opposed in the years before 1770 by Cornelis de Pauw with his Recherches philosophiques sur les Américains.

== Reception ==
The novel was an immediate success with readers; by the end of 1748 there were fourteen editions, including three of an English translation. Over the next hundred years, more than 140 editions appeared, including the revised and expanded 1752 edition, several different English translations, two in Italian, and others in German, Portuguese, Russian, Spanish, and Swedish. Contemporary critics, including Pierre Clément, Élie Catherine Fréron, Joseph de La Porte, and Guillaume Thomas François Raynal, wrote long and mostly favorable reviews. Several articles in Diderot's Encyclopédie quote the novel. A number of sequels were written, often to "improve" on the author's dénouement; the most famous was Lettres d'Aza, by Ignace Hugary de Lamarche-Courmont, published in 1748 and frequently reprinted with the original novel.

The popularity of Lettres d'une Péruvienne faded after 1830, but it enjoyed a strong revival of interest in the last third of the twentieth century, thanks in part to new scholarship and in part to the new interest in women writers generated by the feminist movement.

== English translation ==
- Letters of a Peruvian Woman translated by Jonathan Mallinson. O.U.P. 2020. ISBN 9780199208173

=== Modern editions ===
- Dainard, J. A., ed. Correspondance de Madame de Graffigny. Oxford: Voltaire Foundation, 1985--, in progress.
- Bray, Bernard, and Isabelle Landy-Houillon, eds. Françoise de Graffigny, Lettres d'une Péruvienne. In Lettres Portugaises, Lettres d'une Péruvienne et autres romans d'amour par lettres. Paris: Garnier-Flammarion, 1983. pp. 15–56, 239-247.
- DeJean, Joan, and Nancy K. Miller, eds. Françoise de Graffigny, Lettres d'une Péruvienne. New York: MLA, 1993; revised edition, 2002.
- DeJean, Joan, and Nancy K. Miller, eds. David Kornacker, tr. Françoise de Graffigny, Letters from a Peruvian Woman. New York: MLA, 1993; revised edition, 2002.
- Mallinson, Jonathan, ed. Françoise de Graffigny, Lettres d'une Péruvienne. "Vif". Oxford: Voltaire Foundation, 2002. The best available edition; contains a valuable introduction, shows variants of early editions, and provides supplementary materials in appendices.
- Mallinson, Jonathan, ed. and tr. Françoise de Graffigny, Letters of a Peruvian Woman. "Oxford World classics." Oxford: Oxford University Press, 2009.
- Nicoletti, Gianni, ed. Françoise de Graffigny, Lettres d'une Péruvienne. Bari: Adriatica, 1967.
- Trousson, Raymond, ed. Françoise de Graffigny, Lettres d'une Péruvienne. In Romans de femmes du XVIIIe Siècle. Paris: Laffont, 1996. pp. 59–164.

=== Background ===
- Davies, Simon. "Lettres d'une Péruvienne 1977-1997: the Present State of Studies." SVEC 2000:05, pp. 295–324.
- Ionescu, Christina. "Bibliographie: Mme de Graffigny, sa vie et ses œuvres." In Jonathan Mallinson, ed. Françoise de Graffigny, femme de lettres: écriture et réception. SVEC 2004:12, pp. 399–414.
- McEachern, Jo-Ann, and David Smith. "Mme de Graffigny's Lettres d'une Péruvienne: Identifying the First Edition." Eighteenth-Century Fiction 9 (1996): 21-35.
- Smith, D. W. "The Popularity of Mme de Graffigny’s Lettres d’une Péruvienne: The Bibliographical Evidence." Eighteenth-Century Fiction 3 (1990): 1-20.
- Vierge du Soleil/Fille des Lumières: la Péruvienne de Mme de Grafigny et ses Suites. Travaux du groupe d'étude du XVIIIe siècle, Université de Strasbourg II, volume 5. Strasbourg: Presses Universitaires de Strasbourg, 1989.
