= Titon et l'Aurore =

Opera by Jean-Joseph Cassanéa de Mondonville

- Opera by Jean-Joseph Cassanéa de Mondonville
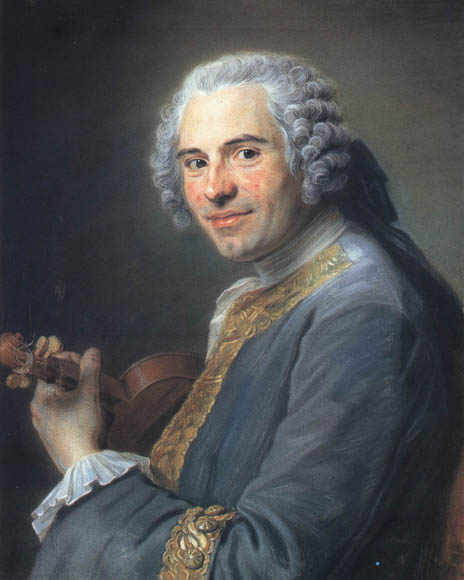
- Mondonville, portrayed by Maurice Quentin de La Tour, c. 1746
- Translation: Tithonus and Aurora
- Librettist: Abbé de La Marre
- Language: French
- Premiere: 9 January 1753; Académie royale de musique, Paris

Titon et l'Aurore (English: Tithonus and Aurora) is an opera in three acts and a prologue by the French composer Jean-Joseph de Mondonville which was first performed at the Académie royale de musique in Paris on 9 January 1753. The authorship of the libretto has been subject to debate; Mondonville's contemporaries ascribed the prologue to Antoine Houdar de la Motte and the three acts of the opera to the Abbé de La Marre. Titon et l'Aurore belongs to the genre known as the pastorale héroïque. The work played an important role in the so-called Querelle des Bouffons, a dispute over the relative merits of the French and Italian operatic traditions which dominated the intellectual life of Paris in the early 1750s. The tremendous success of Mondonville's opera at its premiere was an important victory for the French camp (although their Italian rivals claimed that this was because they had been excluded from their seats by members of the army). Titon was one of Mondonville's most popular works and went on to enjoy several revivals during his lifetime.

== Roles ==
Original version	Voice types	Premiere, Paris 1753
Titon	haute-contre	Pierre Jélyotte
l'Aurore	soprano	Marie Fel
Promethée (prologue), Eole (pastorale)	basse-taille (bass-baritone)	Claude-Louis-Dominique Chassé de Chinais, called Chassé
Palès	soprano	Marie-Jeanne Fesch, called Mlle Chevalier
L'Amour (prologue & pastorale); A nymph from Pales's retinue	soprano	Marie-Angélique Coupée (or Couppée)
A shepherd	haute-contre	François Poirier
Aquillon	basse-taille (bass-baritone)	M. Person
Borée	basse-taille (bass-baritone)	Nicolas Gelin
Jupiter (prologue)	not stated	role unperformed

== Synopsis ==
- Prologue Promethée (Prometheus) has stolen fire from heaven to give life to his statues. L'Amour (Cupid) teaches them about the delights of love.
- Act One Titon (Tithonus), a mortal shepherd, is in love with Aurore (Aurora), the goddess of the dawn. He awaits her and when she arrives the two sing of their love for each other. This arouses the jealousy of Eole (Aeolus), the god of the winds, who is in love with Aurore. Palès (Pales), the goddess of shepherds, flocks and livestock, is also in love with Titon and asks Eole to be allowed to deal with him.
- Act Two Aurore rejects Eole's advances, saying she would rather lose her immortality than the love of Titon. Palès is also unsuccessful in her wooing of Titon and her love turns to anger.
- Act Three Palès curses Titon with premature old age. Nevertheless, Aurore remains faithful to him and L'Amour saves the day by reversing the spell.

== Recordings ==
- Titon et l'Aurore Jean-Paul Fouchécourt, Catherine Napoli, Philippe Huttenlocher, Les Musiciens du Louvre, conducted by Marc Minkowski (Erato, 1992)
- Titon et l'Aurore, Les Arts Florissants, dir. William Christie, Naxos DVD (2021)

== See others ==
- Pastorale héroïque
- Querelle des bouffons ("Quarrel of the Comic Actors"), controversy
