= L'Art de péter =

1751 essay by Pierre-Thomas-Nicolas Hurtaut

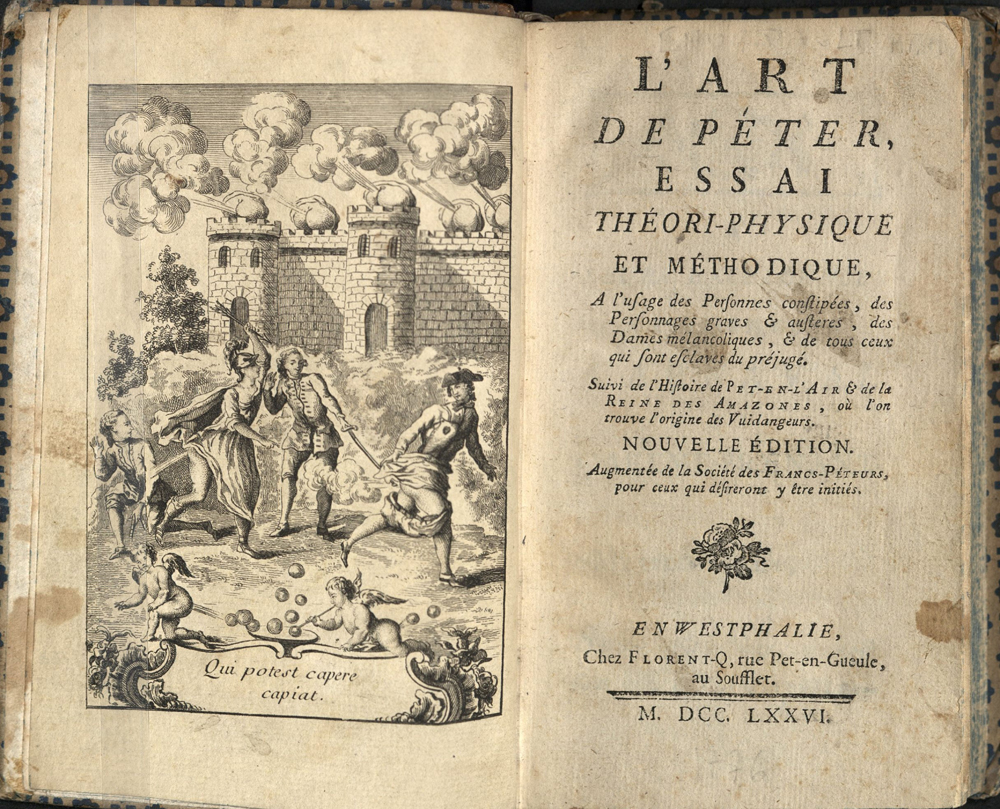
L'Art de péter (In Westphalia, Chez Florent-Q, rue Pet-en-Gueule, au Soufflet, MDCCLXXVI)

L'Art de péter ("The Art of Farting") is a humorous pseudo-medical essay by Pierre-Thomas-Nicolas Hurtaut, published anonymously in 1751. The book is subtitled: L’Art de péter, Essai théori-physique et méthodique à l’usage des personnes constipées, des personnes graves et austères, des dames mélancoliques et de tous ceux qui restent esclaves du préjugé.

== Editions ==
- L'Art de péter, foreword by Franck Évrard, Paris, Maison du dictionnaire, 2007
- L'Art de péter, foreword by Antoine de Baecque, Paris, Payot (éditions), coll. "Petite Bibliothèque Payot", 2011 (1st éd. 2006) ISBN 9782228906708
- L'Art de péter, Paris, Éditions Points, 2011 ISBN 978-2-7578-2195-4
