= Premiere Livre de Pièces de Clavecin =

Premiere Livre de Pièces de Clavecin is a book of harpsichord music written by Bernard de Bury at the French royal court of Versailles, published in 1736.

== Historical context ==
Music at the French court at Versailles flourished during the time of Louis XIV (1638–1715). Although Bernard de Bury (1720–1785) lived after the reign of this monarch, the positions for musicians set up under the "Sun King" would continue well into the eighteenth century. There were over 150 official musicians at the court. Music as an institution on a grand scale at Versailles was thus set in place before Bernard de Bury was born.

Bernard de Bury resided in Versailles his entire life, and held various positions at the court. Many from his musical family also held court appointments. He studied music with his father, as well as with François Collin de Blamont (1690–1760), to whom he dedicated his Premier Livre de Pièces de Clavecin, published when he was just fifteen years old. De Bury acquired the post of ordinaire de la chambre pour le clavecin ("king's chamber harpsichordist") in 1741. He continued a long distinguished line of musicians who held this position, which had passes from Jacques-Champion Chambonnières (1601/2–1672) to Jean-Henri D'Anglebert (1635–1691) to François Couperin (1668–1733), to his daughter, Marguérite-Antoinette Couperin (1705–c. 1778), and then to de Bury.

The publication date for Bernard de Bury's Premier Livre de Pièces de Clavecin is not entirely certain. In his dedication, de Bury states that he was fifteen years old at the time the suites were written; this would place their composition in 1735 or 1736, since he would not reach his sixteenth birthday until well into the latter year. The publication was announced in the Mercure de France in January 1737, leading one to believe that the suites were actually published late in 1736.

== Musical analysis ==
A long, rich tradition of French harpsichord compositions preceded the publication of the harpsichord suites by Bernard de Bury, and he himself contributed to the legacy that would continue to be built throughout most of the century. He, like so many others, was influenced by François Couperin, as well as Jean-Philippe Rameau, the two titans of French harpsichord music of the eighteenth century. For example, most all of his movements are given titles, even when also identified as a dance movement (and even when the dance is not identified). In addition, ten times the popular form of a rondeau is used (counting second rondeaux and doubles). Furthermore, frequent changes in texture can be seen, ornaments can be identified from the tables of Couperin and Rameau, and notes inégales are appropriate, unless a movement is in Italian style. Examples of Italian influences can be seen in arpeggiated figures, passage work, imitation, circle of fifths progressions, and occasional frequent modulations. In keeping with French aesthetic, most suites end with tender sublimity rather than with impressive virtuosity.

=== Premiere suite ===
The first suite of Bernard de Bury's Premier Livre de Pièces de Clavecin has "A" as its home key, movements being in either A major or A minor. In La Minerve, a character piece, de Bury makes reference to the Roman goddess of wisdom and arts. Sarabande, Les Regrets is followed by a gavotte entitled Les graces Badines ("Graceful Triflers"). The title could be referring to "amorous badinage" or "amorous playfulness." La Tendre Agitation is a wonderfully inventive character piece in binary form. A pair of rondeaux, Le Plaidoyer de Cithere 1er Rondeau and 2e Rouneau, close out the first suite. The title can be translated as "In Defense of [the Island of] Cythera". These movements, along with La Citherée from the second suite as well as François Couperin's Les Pélerines, all make reference to this island birthplace of Venus which was a special place for lovers. In addition, artist Jean-Antoine Watteau (1684–1721) produced two paintings on the same subject. This movement is one of a number marked Gracieusement sans lenteur ("gracefully, not too slowly"). Gracieusement implies the freedom to change the beat, or to apply rubato in accordance with the affekt.

=== Seconde suite ===
The second suite is in C minor, with only the first rondeau of La Citherée being in C major. La belle Brune ("The Pretty Brunette") is followed by the binary Sarabande La Prude which is serious in tone and complex harmonically. L'Enfantine refers to a "child-like" manner, demonstrated by frequent shifts of range. Both the first and second rondeaux of La Citheré are unnamed gavottes. L'Enfantine and La Citheré are also marked Gracieusement.

=== Troisième suite ===
Six of the eleven movements of this longest suite are rondeaux. They bookend this collection, with a paired set to open and a second paired set (plus doubles for each) to close. Centering on "G", seven of the eleven movements are in the minor mode. Les Amusemens ("The Amusements") could also be translated as "Entertainment". Ornaments help provide forward motion to the opening cheerful syncopated rondeau theme. We will never know to what or whom the *** in La *** ou les Sentimens ("The *** or the Sentiments" or "Feelings") refers. The indication of Gracieusement adds further to the tender, expressive affekt of the movement. Typical of a sarabande, this triple time slow, serious piece, with balanced phrases and complex harmonies, sometimes places an accent on the second beat. The two movements entitled Ƶephir (the mythological West Wind of spring) and Flore (a reference to the mythological Goddess of Flowers) are in the form of the popular French dance, the menuet, the latter more dramatic and complex harmonically. La Pithonisse ("The Pythoness") was the priestess presiding over the Oracle of Apollo at Delphi, located on Mount Parnassus. It was commonly believed that the vapors rising from the ground induced the priestesses to deliver the oracles in a frenzied state. This intensity is conveyed in this central movement conceived on a grand scale. The 18th-century loure was a slow, virtuosic, noble, majestic dance. This binary form Loure in 6/4 meter is characterized by many low-ranging thick chords. Also marked Gracieusement, paired La Séduisante ("The Seductress") rondeaux are followed by paired variations (Double du 1er Rondeau, Double du 2e Rondeau).

=== Quatrième suite ===
The final suite is mostly in E major, with only the second movement and the middle section of the final movement in E minor. La Brillante is certainly a "Brilliant" opening piece. Almost all of the first three sections (rondeau theme and first two couplets) are written in the bright upper range of the harpsichord, both staves requiring treble clef. La Dampiere is a dramatic sarabande reminiscent of François Couperin's La Ténébreuse and La Raphaéle. La Michelon is a lively, joyful Italian giga. La Jeunesse ("Youth") is a menuet. Chaconne is in E major, but has an extended middle section in the parallel mode of E minor. The form is built of groups of four measures which are immediately repeated for a total of eight in each unit. The chaconne in this collection comes a close second to one by Jacques Duphly (1715–1789) as the longest single, continuous Piéce de clavecin of the seventeenth and eighteenth centuries.

== Album ==
- Premiere Suite
  - La Minerve (3:19)
  - Sarabande, Les Regrets (1:41)
  - Les graces Badines (2:10)
  - La Tendre Agitation (4:47)
  - Le Plaidoyer de Cithere
    - 1er Rondeau (2:48)
    - 2e Rondeau (2:47)
- Seconde Suite
  - La belle Brune (2:28)
  - Sarabande La Prude (3:15)
  - L'Enfantine (1:36)
  - La Citherée
    - 1er Rondeau (2:25)
    - 2e Rondeau (2:22)
- Troisiéme Suite
  - Les Amusemens
    - 1er Rondeau (2:24)
    - 2e Rondeau (2:27)
  - Sarabande La *** ou les Sentimens (2:51)
  - Ƶephir – 1er Menuet (0:54)
  - Flore – 2e Menuet (1:39)
  - La Pithonisse (6:32)
  - Loure (4:33)
  - La Séduisante
    - 1er Rondeau (1:55)
    - 2e Rondeau (2:00)
    - Double du 1er Rondeau (2:04)
    - Double du 2e Rondeau (2:07)
- Quatriéme Suite
  - La Brillante (2:06)
  - La Dampiere (4:20)
  - La Michelon (1:25)
  - La Jeunesse (1:49)
  - Chaconne (9:00)

Total Time: (77:45) Times based upon recording by harpsichord performer, Ruta Bloomfield (2009)

=== Performances ===
On 19 February 2009, Dr. Ruta Bloomfield became the first person in recorded history to perform the Premier livre de pieces de clavecin outside France since the eighteenth century.
