= Pierre-Thomas-Nicolas Hurtaut =

French historian and writer (1719–1791)

- Born: 17 April 1719; Paris
- Died: 5 May 1791 (aged 72); Paris
- Other names: Writer, historian

Pierre-Thomas-Nicolas Hurtaut (French pronunciation: [pjɛʁ tɔma nikɔla yʁto]; 17 April 1719 – 5 May 1791) was an 18th-century French historian and writer.

== Short biographie ==
The son of a horse trader, Pierre-Thomas-Nicolas Hurtaut became Latin teacher at the École Militaire and published his first book, Le Voyage d'Aniers in 1748. Interested in the mysteries of the human body, he devoted several books to the topic, including L'Art de péter and Essai de médecine sur le flux menstruel in which he pastiched medicinal treaties. He was also a historian and a member of the Société du bout du banc.

== Bibliography ==
- 1748: Le Voyage d'Aniers
- 1750: Coup d’œil anglais sur les cérémonies du mariage
- 1751: L'Art de péter
- 1754: Essai de médecine sur le flux menstruel
- 1770: Le Pacte du destin
- 1774: Iconologie historique des souverains d'Europe
- 1775: Abrégé historique et portatif des rois mérovingiens
- 1775: Dictionnaire des mots homonymes de la langue française
- 1779: Dictionnaire historique de la ville de Paris et de ses environs, (in collaboration with Magny).
