= Bernard de Bury =

French musician and court composer

Bernard de Bury or Buri (20 August 1720 – 19 November 1785) was a French musician and court composer of the late Baroque era.

== Biography ==
Bernard de Bury was born at Versailles, a member of a family of musicians, many of whom had appointments to the French court, and was taught music as a young boy.

He wrote his first – and only – harpsichord book in 1737, at the age of seventeen, and dedicated it to his teacher, François Colin de Blamont, uncle of his future wife.

In 1741, he bought the charge of Claveciniste de la Chambre from Marguerite-Antoinette Couperin, which she had inherited from her father François Couperin as a survivance.

In 1743, he began a successful career with his opéra-ballet Les Caractères de la Folie ("Characters of Madness") which was performed at the Académie Royale de Musique (today's Paris Opera). His works continued to be staged during the festivities given in Versailles, Sceaux, and Fontainebleau for more than thirty-five years. He also wrote several cantatas and motets, notably De profundis.

De Bury received a royal pension beginning in 1779, and was ennobled by Louis XVI in 1785, a few months before his death, which occurred at Versailles.

== Selected compositions ==
=== Harpsichord works ===
- Premiere Livre de Pièces de Clavecin (First book of harpsichord pieces), 4 suites in A, C, G, and E (1736):
  - Première suite en la: La Minerve – Les Regrets – Les Grâces badines – La Tendre agitation – Le Plaidoyer de Cythère, 1er et 2e rondeaux.
  - Deuxième suite en do: La Belle Brune – La Prude – L'Enfantine – La Cythère.
  - Troisième suite en sol: Les Amusements, 1er et 2e rondeaux – La *** ou les sentiments – 1er Menuet: Zéphire – 2e Menuet: Flore – La Pythonisse – Loure – La Séduisante, 1er et 2e rondeaux .
  - Quatrième suite en mi: La Brillante – La Dampierre – La Michelon – La Jeunesse – Chaconne.

=== Operas and works for stage ===
- Les Caractères de la Folie, opéra-ballet, prologue & 3 acts (C. P. Duclos), f.p. Paris, Opéra, 20 August 1743.

with new entrée Hylas et Zélie, f.p. Paris, Opéra, 6 July 1762.

- Jupiter, vainquer des Titan, tragédie lyrique, (collab. Collin de Blamont), f.p. Versailles, 11 December 1745.
- La nymphe de Versailles, divertissement, (Mlle de Lussan), f.p. Versailles, 19 March 1746.
- Les fêtes de Thétis, ballet-héroique, prologue & 2 acts, (P. C. Roy), f.p. Versailles, 14 January 1750.
- Titon et l'Aurore, pastorale-héroique, prologue & 1 act, (Abbé de La Marre & A. H. de Lamotte), f.p. Versailles, Théâtre des Petits Appartements, 14 January 1750.
- La parque vaincue, divertissement in 1 act, (A. Tavenot), f.p. Versailles, Hôtel de Richelieu, 1751 (lost).
- Palmyre, ballet-héroïque, (S. N. R. Chamfort), f.p. Fontainebleau, 24 October 1765.
- Zénis et Amnasie, ballet-héroïque in 1 act, (Chamfort & Duc de Vallière, collab. with J. B. de La Borde), f.p. Fontainbleau, 2 November 1765.
- Prologue for revival of: Persée by Jean-Baptiste Lully (1747), (collab. with Antoine Dauvergne, François Francoeur, & François Rebel), revival f.p. Versailles, 17 May 1770.

=== Doubtful works ===
Divertissements attributed to de Bury, cited by Fétis:

- Les Bergers de Sceaux
- Les Nymphes de la Seine

== Sources ==
- Sadie, Stanley (Ed.) [1992] (1994). The New Grove Dictionary of Opera, vol. 1, A-D, chpt: "Bury [Bury], Bernard de" by Philip Weller, New York: MacMillan. ISBN 0-935859-92-6.
