= Charles-Antoine Leclerc de La Bruère =

French historian and diplomat

Charles-Antoine Leclerc de La Bruère (1716 in Crépy-en-Valois – 18 September 1754 in Rome) was an 18th-century French historian and diplomat.

He is widely known as the librettist of the tragédie lyrique Dardanus by Jean-Philippe Rameau. The booklet was generally considered one of the worst that has been set to music by the composer. La Bruère combined second rank mythological elements and epic reminiscences of the Italian Renaissance in an action of consummate improbability: the plot had to be amended several times to counter criticism.

From November 1744 to June 1748, La Bruère along Louis Fuzelier (another librettist working for Rameau), was director of the Mercure de France by royal patent.

In 1749, he went to Rome as secretary of embassy to the Duke of Nivernais.

== Works ==
- 1734: Les Mécontents, one-act comedy, Comédie-Française, 1 December
- 1736: Les Voyages de l'Amour, four-act ballet, Académie royale de musique, 3 May
- 1739: Dardanus, tragédie lyrique in 5 acts and one prologue, music by Jean-Philippe Rameau, Académie royale de musique, 19 November
- 1744: La Convalescence du Roi, poem
- 1745: Histoire du règne de Charlemagne, 2 vol.
- 1748: Érigone, ballet en 1 acte, musique de Mondonville, Château de Versailles, Théâtre des petits appartements, 21 March
- 1749: Le Prince de Noisy, three-act ballet héroïque, music by François Rebel and François Francœur, Versailles, Théâtre des petits appartements, 13 March
- 1746: La Coquette fixéee, comedy in 3 acts and in verse, with the Duke of Nivernais and Claude-Henri de Fusée de Voisenon, Comédiens italiens ordinaires du roi, 10 March
- 1758: Les Fêtes de Paphos, ballet héroïque, Académie royale de musique, 9 May
- 1769: Linus, five-act tragédie lyrique, music by Pierre Montan Berton, Antoine Dauvergne and Jean-Claude Trial

== Bibliography ==
- Cardinal Georges Grente (dir.), Dictionnaire des lettres françaises. Le XVIIIe, new edition reworked and updated under the direction of François Moureau, Paris, Fayard, 1995
