= Claude-Henri de Fusée de Voisenon =

French writer (1708–1775)

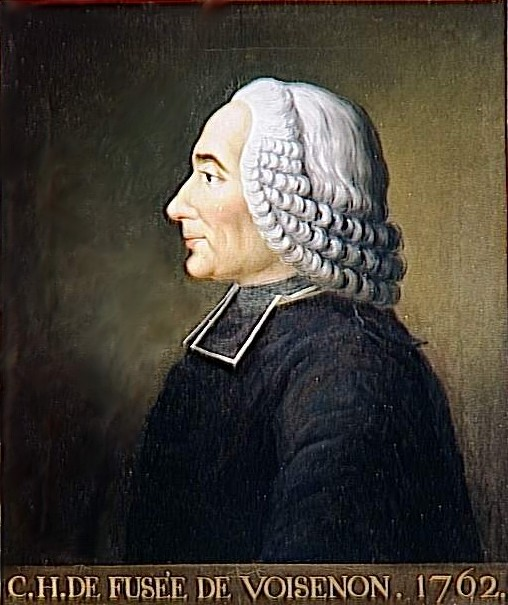
Claude-Henri de Fusée de Voisenon. 1762.

Claude-Henri de Fusée, abbé de Voisenon (8 July 1708 – 22 November 1775) was a French playwright and writer.

== Life ==
Born at the château de Voisenon near Melun, he was only ten when he addressed an epistle in verse to Voltaire, who asked the boy to visit him. They remained friends for fifty years. Voisenon made his début as a dramatist with L'Heureuse resemblance in 1728, followed in 1739 by a three-act comedy L'École du monde at the Théâtre Français. This was preceded by a verse prologue, L'Ombre de Molière, and a month later Voisenon produced a criticism of his own piece in Le Retour de l'ombre de Molière.

A duel provoked by Voisenon inspired him with remorse, and he entered a seminary; he was soon promoted to the post of secretary to his relative, the Bishop of Boulogne. He became closely attached to Madame du Châtelet, the mistress of Voltaire, and was intimate with the comte de Caylus and Mademoiselle Jeanne Quinault. He made witty but by no means edifying contributions to the Étrennes de Saint-Jean, the Bals de Bois, etc.

In 1744, he produced the Ménages assortis and in 1746 his masterpiece, the Coquette fixée. He was a close friend of Charles Simon Favart and his wife. His pen was always at the service of any of his friends, and it was generally supposed that he had a considerable share in Favart's most successful operas. Voisenon had scruples all his life about the incongruity between his way of living and his profession, but he continued to write indecent stories for private circulation, and wrote verses in honor of Madame du Barry, as he had done for Madame de Pompadour.

He was elected to the Académie française in 1762. On the disgrace of his patron, the duc de Choiseul, he lost his pensions and honours, but soon recovered his position. He was intimate with the chancellor Maupeou, and was suspected of writing on his behalf in defence of the abolition of the parlement. This and some other incidents brought him into general disgrace. Early in 1775 he retired to the château de Voisenon, where he died.

== Works ==
His Œuvres complètes were published by his executrix, fr:Constance de Lowendal, 5 vol. in-8°. in 1781.

=== Theatre ===
- 1738: L'Heureuse Ressemblance, comedy in 1 act and in verse
- 1739: L'École du monde, comedy in 3 acts and in verse, presented at the Comédie-Française 14 October
- 1739: Le Retour de l'ombre de Molière, comedy in 1 act and in verse, presented at the Comédie-Française 21 November
- 1744: Les Mariages assortis, comedy in 3 acts and in verse, premiered by the Italian comedians ordinaires du Roi 10 February (printed in 1746, in-8)
- 1746: La Coquette fixée, comedy in 3 acts and in verse, with Charles-Antoine Leclerc de La Bruère and the Duke of Nivernais, premiered by the Comédiens italiens ordinaires du Roi 10 March
- 1749: La Fausse Prévention, comedy in 3 acts and in verse, premiered by the Comédiens italiens ordinaires du Roi 29 December
- 1750: Le Réveil de Thalie, comedy, premiered by the Comédiens italiens ordinaires du Roi 19 June
- 1753: Titon et l'Aurore, pastorale héroïque, music by Jean-Joseph Cassanéa de Mondonville, premiered at the Académie royale de musique 9 January
- 1756: Les Magots, parody of L'Orphelin de la Chine by Voltaire, in 1 act and in vers, premiered by the Comédiens italiens ordinaires du Roi 19 March
- 1757: La Petite Iphigénie, parodie de la Grande, premiered by the Comédiens italiens ordinaires du Roi July
- 1758: L'Amour et Psyché, ballet héroïque, premiered by the Académie Royale de musique 9 May
- 1759: La parodie au Parnasse, one-act opéra comique, premiered at the Théâtre de l'Opéra comique de la foire saint Germain 20 March (also attributed to Charles-Simon Favart)
- 1762: La Jeune Grecque, comedy in 3 acts and in free verse (printed in 1762)
- 1763: Hilas et Zélie, pastorale in 1 act, music by Bernard de Bury, presented at Versailles Palace 12 January
- 1765: La Fée Urgèle ou Ce qui plaît aux dames, four-act- comedy miongked with ariettes, given at Fontainebleau 26 October
- 1770: L'Amant déguisé, ou le Jardinier supposé, one-act comedy mingled with ariettes, music by François-André Danican Philidor, premiered by the Comédiens italiens ordinaires du Roi 2 September
- 1770: L'Amitié à l'épreuve, comedy in 2 acts and in verse mingled with ariettes, music by André Grétry, presented at Fontainebleau 13 November
- 1776: Fleur d'Épine, opéra comique in 2 acts and in prose, set in music by Marie Emmanuelle Bayon Louis, mingled with ariettes, from Hamilton, premiered by the Comédiens italiens ordinaires du Roi 22 August.

=== Novels and tales ===
- 1745: Zulmis et Zelmaïde, conte licencieux
- 1745: Turlubleu, histoire grecque tirée du manuscrit gris-de-lin, trouvé dans les cendres de Troye
- 1746: Le Sultan Misapouf et la princesse Grisemine, novel, London, 2 vol. in-12
- 1747: Les Fêtes roulantes et les Regrets des petites rues
- 1751: Histoire de la Félicité
- 1760: Tant mieux pour elle, conte plaisant
- 1767: Romans et Contes, 2 vol. - reed.: 1775, 1798, 1818
- 1885: Contes légers suivis des Anecdotes littéraires, Paris, E. Dentu, Bibliothèque choisie des chefs-d'œuvre français et étrangers, (complete text on Gallica)

=== Varia ===
- 1739: Le Code des Amants, poème héroïque en trois chants
- 1758: Les Israélites à la montagne d'Oreb, poème biblique for the Concert Spirituel, set in music by Mondonville
- 1759: Les Fureurs de Saül, poème biblique for the Concert Spirituel, set in music by Mondonville

=== Bibliography ===
- Allem, Maurice, Anthologie poétique française, XVIIIe, Paris, Garnier Frères, 1919
- Anonyme, La Vie authentique de M. l'abbé de Voisenon, mémoires inédits d'un contemporain, publiés par Ad. Van Bever et Charles Martyne, Paris, 1916
- Comoy, Jean, Un abbé de cour sous Louis XV. Monsieur de Voisenon, Préface de Wladimir d'Ormesson, Paris, la Science historique, 1959
- Grente, Georges Cardinal (dir.), Dictionnaire des lettres françaises. Le XVIIIe, nlle. édition revue et mise à jour sous la direction de fr:François Moureau, Paris, Fayard, 1995
- Krakowski, Patrick, "Un académicien dans son temps", l'abbé de Voisenon (correspondences, chroniques, biographie) Lys Éditions Ammatéis, 2007, ISBN 978-2-86849-255-5
- Pitou, Spire (1985). The Paris Opéra. Westport, CT: Greenwood Press.
- Vapereau, Gustave, « Claude-Henri de Fusée de Voisenon », in 'Dictionnaire universel des littératures, Paris, Hachette, 1876, 2 volumes
- Viguerie, Jean de Histoire et dictionnaire du temps des Lumières. 1715-1789, Paris, Robert Laffont, coll. Bouquins, 2003 - ISBN 2-221-04810-5
