= Jeanne Quinault =

French actress, playwright and salon hostess (1699–1783)

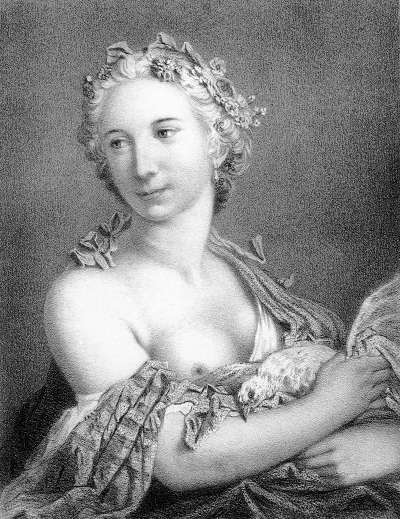
Jeanne-Françoise Quinault. Engraving by Eugène Louis Pirodon.

Jeanne-Françoise Quinault (French pronunciation: [ʒan fʁɑ̃swaz kino]; baptized 13 October 1699 – 18 January 1783) was a French actress, playwright and salon hostess. She was born in Strasbourg and died in Paris.

She was usually called Mlle. Quinault la cadette (the younger) to distinguish her from her older sister, Marie-Anne-Catherine Quinault, also an actress. She herself thought her name was Jeanne-Françoise Quinault until 1726, when she obtained a copy of her baptismal record and discovered her legal name, but most references to her use the two given names.

== Stage career ==
She made her début at the Comédie-Française on 14 June 1718 and was accepted into the company in December 1718, becoming the sixth member of the Quinault family to be admitted. She gave her first performance in the title role of Racine's Phèdre and five days later played Chimène in Pierre Corneille's Le Cid.

In 1727, Jeanne Quinault created the role of Céliante in Le Philosophe marié by Philippe Néricault Destouches. The role was of a strange, proud, moody and capricious woman, who was nonetheless vivacious, appealing and entertaining. This popular play established her as one of the stars of the troupe.

== Writer ==
Over a period of several months beginning in December 1731, Jeanne-Françoise joined with a group of seven other friends to meet regularly and produce light-hearted, often parodic and satirical, theatrical entertainments, which they called lazzis, a term from the Commedia dell'arte meaning comic pantomime. The other Lazzistes included Jeanne's sister-in-law, formerly Mlle de Seine; her cousin Mlle Balicourt, who had joined the Comédie-Française in 1727; the poet and playwright Alexis Piron; the Comte de Caylus; Jean-Frédéric Phélypeaux, Count of Maurepas; and Charles-Alexandre Salley.

The Lazzistes were not the only such group that Jeanne-Françoise Quinault frequented in this period, but it stands out, both because the men continued to play an important part in her life for years afterward, and because they kept a record of their activities, which has recently been rediscovered and published.

During the 1730s, Quinault became close friends with Piron; she advised him about his writing and, along with other members of her family, acted in his best play, La Métromanie (Obsession with Rhyming, 1738). She is credited with having suggested the ideas for Le Préjugé à la mode (The Fashionable Prejudice, 1735) to La Chaussée and for L'Enfant prodigue (The Prodigal Son, 1736) to Voltaire. Voltaire, who often wrote to Mlle Quinault for advice, told Françoise de Graffigny that the actress "was constantly imagining subjects for comedies and tragedies, and offered them to authors, urging them to work on them." She played a significant part in creating the vogue for comédie larmoyante (tear-jerking comedy), and it is not surprising that she later helped Francoise de Graffigny write her very successful example of the genre, Cénie (1750).

== Société du bout du banc ==
She continued to see Caylus in the 1730s, and in the 1740s they became co-hosts of the first incarnation of the informal salon called the Bout-du-Banc". Françoise de Graffigny arrived in Paris just before the actress retired, and they soon became close friends. Her letters to her friend back in Lorraine, François-Antoine Devaux, give an unusually detailed account of the Bout-du-Banc's activities. Regulars included the poet Moncrif, the novelist Claude Crébillon, the novelist and historian Charles Pinot Duclos, and the financier philosophe Claude Adrien Helvétius. The fare was simple but good, and they entertained themselves by singing, acting skits, reading works in progress, and collaborating on anthologies of facéties, parodies of popular genres.

The first Bout-du-Banc ended in the late 1740s, in part because of dissension among the group, and in part because Jeanne-Françoise Quinault was distracted by the need to take care of the children of her oldest brother, who had died in 1745. For the next few years she was closer than ever to Françoise de Graffigny, advising her on Cénie and helping to bring about the marriage of her ward, Anne-Catherine de Ligniville, to Helvétius.

By August 1752, the Bout-du-Banc was convening regularly again, with some new members like the playwright and songwriter Charles Collé and Charles-Just de Beauvau, a prince from Lorraine. The most famous episode in the history of the Bout-du-Banc took place in 1754, when Duclos brought Jean-Jacques Rousseau to a dinner. Rousseau mentions the incident briefly in his Confessions, citing the invitation as proof of Duclos's continued friendship when others were abandoning him, and saying that he was cordially welcomed. Later, however, the scene was fictionalized, mainly by Diderot, as a debate between the anti-religious regular guests and the unexpectedly pious newcomer; and while the novel was never published, a nineteenth-century editor found the manuscript, replaced the fictional names with real ones, changed the title from Histoire de Mme de Montbrillant to Mémoires de Mme d'Épinay, and published it in 1818.

For decades, this work, now called "pseudo-Memoirs of Mme d'Épinay", was regarded as authentic, and because of it the Bout-du-Banc was thought to be a den of Encyclopédistes and a hotbed of Enlightenment philosophy and its hostess a shameless freethinker.

In reality, Jeanne Quinault was careful to conceal her views, whatever they were, on religion and politics. She observed strict proprieties in her conduct, and seemed rather prudish at times to Françoise de Graffigny. She was received by the nobility, and raised her wards to make marriages answering to the ideal of respectability of the time.

In 1758, she moved from her Paris apartment to the more rural Saint-Germain-en-Laye, where she lived quietly and corresponded with friends, until failing health led her to return to the city in 1778. She died on 18 January 1783.
