= Jean Galli de Bibiena =

Jean Galli de Bibiena (French rendering of Galli da Bibbiena) was an 18th-century French-speaking writer (but of Italian descent), born in 1709 in Nancy and who may have died in 1779 in Italy. He was the son of Francesco Galli Bibiena, of the famous Galli da Bibiena family.

== Biography ==
Little is known about him, except that he chose France and literature whereas his family was primarily composed of decorative painters and theater architects.

Published in 1747, his novel La Poupée ("The Doll") tells the story of a sylph who teaches love to "a young priest still virgin and very conceited". If we can consider that this novel fits into the current of libertinage, it is nevertheless appropriate to distinguish it from the works of Crébillon, Sade or Choderlos de Laclos insofar Bibiena, through his characters, presented more an aesthetic pleasure and an art of seduction in which the relations of power and conquest idea played a much smaller role than in other libertine novels of the eighteenth century.

In 1763, he was convicted of raping a girl and "sentenced to death in absentia since he fled immediately." He may have died in Italy in 1779.

== Publications ==
- 1735: Mémoires et aventures de Monsieur de ***, translated from Italian by himself
- 1741: Histoire des amours de Valérie et du noble vénitien Barbarigo
- 1746: Le Petit toutou
- 1747: La Poupée
- 1748: La Force de l'exemple
- 1750: Le Triomphe du sentiment
- 1762: La Nouvelle Italie, heroïco-humorous Italiano-Franco theatre play created at Comédie Italienne 23 June.
