= Graffigny-Chemin =

- Commune
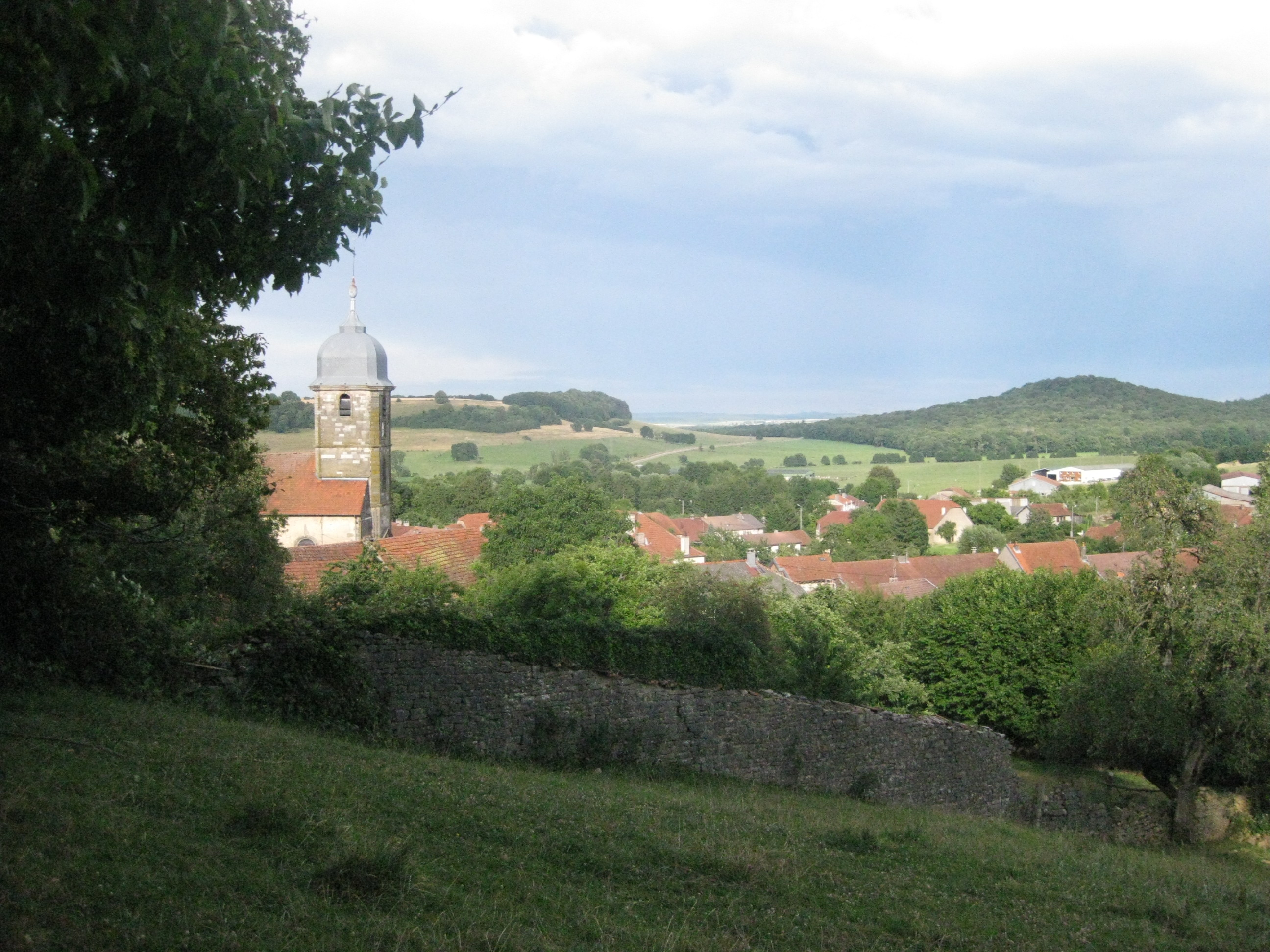
- A general view of Graffigny
- Location of Graffigny-Chemin
- Location within France Location within Grand Est
- Coordinates: 48°10′10″N 5°37′45″E
- Country: France
- Region: Grand Est
- Department: Haute-Marne
- Arrondissement: Chaumont
- Canton: Poissons
- Intercommunality: Meuse Rognon

Government
  - Mayor (2024–2026): Didier Collomb
- Area^{1}: 17.27 km^{2} (6.67 sq mi)
- Population (2023): 194
  - Density: 11.2/km^{2} (29.1/sq mi)
- Time zone: UTC+01:00 (CET)
  - Summer (DST): UTC+02:00 (CEST)
- INSEE/Postal code: 52227 /52150
- ^{1} French Land Register data, which excludes lakes, ponds, glaciers > 1 km^{2} (0.386 sq mi or 247 acres) and river estuaries.

Graffigny-Chemin (French pronunciation: [ɡʁafiɲi ʃəmɛ̃]) is a commune in the Haute-Marne department in north-eastern France. The village has 202 inhabitants (2021).

== Geography ==
A small village, 6 km (3.7 mi) east of Bourmont, 6 km (3.7 mi) west of the A31 Highway, 20 km (12 mi) south of Neufchateau and 6 km (3.7 mi) north of Chaumont-la-Ville. Historically, it is placed in the région of Lorraine, which gradually came under French sovereignty between 1737 and 1766.

== History ==
During the First World War, soldiers of the Second American Infantry Division, headquartered in nearby Bourmont, were billeted here.

In World War II, Graffigny-Chemin saw little action due to its relative isolation. However, in the early hours of the night of July 23, 1944 a British Royal Air Force Stirling aircraft belonging to 190 squadron crashed there. The aircraft was heading for a drop zone close to Joinville (about 30 miles to the north east of Graffigny) but had become lost after passing through a severe electric storm in the Troyes area. Whilst trying to fix its position at low altitude and in very poor visibility, the aircraft hit the high ground known as la montagne close to Graffigny.

Five airmen and eight British soldiers from the Special Air Service (SAS) regiment died in the crash and are buried in the local cemetery. There were three survivors. The SAS soldiers were from a reconnaissance party for an SAS operation (Operation Rupert) intended to attack German lines of communication to the Normandy front in the St Dizier area. In addition to the troops the aircraft was carrying explosives, weapons, food and money to supply the French resistance forces.

The aircraft's navigator - Canadian Flying Officer Joseph Vinet - was cared for at Ferme Des Noyers by a Madame Phillips who lived in the nearby village of Brainville with her three children. Madame Phillips was married to an Englishman serving in the RAF but was stranded in Brainville following the fall of France in 1940. The SAS survivor Englishman Private Rex Boreham was cared for by Madame Dauvoin and her daughter Bernadette in Graffigny. After being examined by the Bourmont doctor - Dr Boin - Boreham and Vinet were given up to the authorities later that day because of the severity of their wounds. They spent six weeks in a military hospital in Chaumont before being sent to Germany where they were imprisoned for the remainder of the war. Both men were treated well by the German occupation forces in accordance with the Geneva Convention.

The third survivor, Canadian Flight Sergeant Paul Bell, the aircraft's rear gunner, was slightly wounded and spent the next ten days in the nearby village of Soulacourt recovering from his wounds. Flight Sergeant Bell set off with Tom Hervel - the flight Engineer of a Lancaster bomber which crashed nearby a week later - for Switzerland. However, before reaching Switzerland they were liberated by advancing Allied troops and sent to Italy. They eventually made their way home via Algeria and Morocco arriving back in the UK the following September. Flight Sergeant Bell was killed the following March when his aircraft, returning from a training flight, was shot down close to its base in the UK by a German aircraft.

The maquis had removed some of the supplies intended for the French resistance from the aircraft as well as dismounting the four 0.303 calibre machine guns from the aircraft's rear turret which were later hidden in the Soulacourt area. When the German authorities learned of this, they took hostages from the village and threatened to burn it and deport the inhabitants. Living in the village was the French widow of a German Colonel who died in 1911 - a Madame Meine. One of Madame Meine's daughters had married an American army officer in 1918 when the Meine's family house was commandeered by the US army. Her other daughter had married a German diplomat. Madame Meine interceded with the authorities and obtained the release of the hostages and cancellation of the order to burn the village. She was rewarded for that by a hand grenade attack on her house during the period known as "l'epuration" immediately after the Liberation of France - presumably because of her German connections.

Joe Vinet, the aircraft's navigator, returned three times to Graffigny after the war. Most recently in 1999 when he was the guest of honour at a ceremony held at Graffigny-Chemin to mark the 55th anniversary of the crash. Rex Boreham died in 2011 and in 2009 his nephew visited the cemetery to place flowers on the grave of his uncle's wartime comrades.

== See also ==
- Communes of the Haute-Marne department
