= Joseph-Nicolas-Pancrace Royer =

French composer

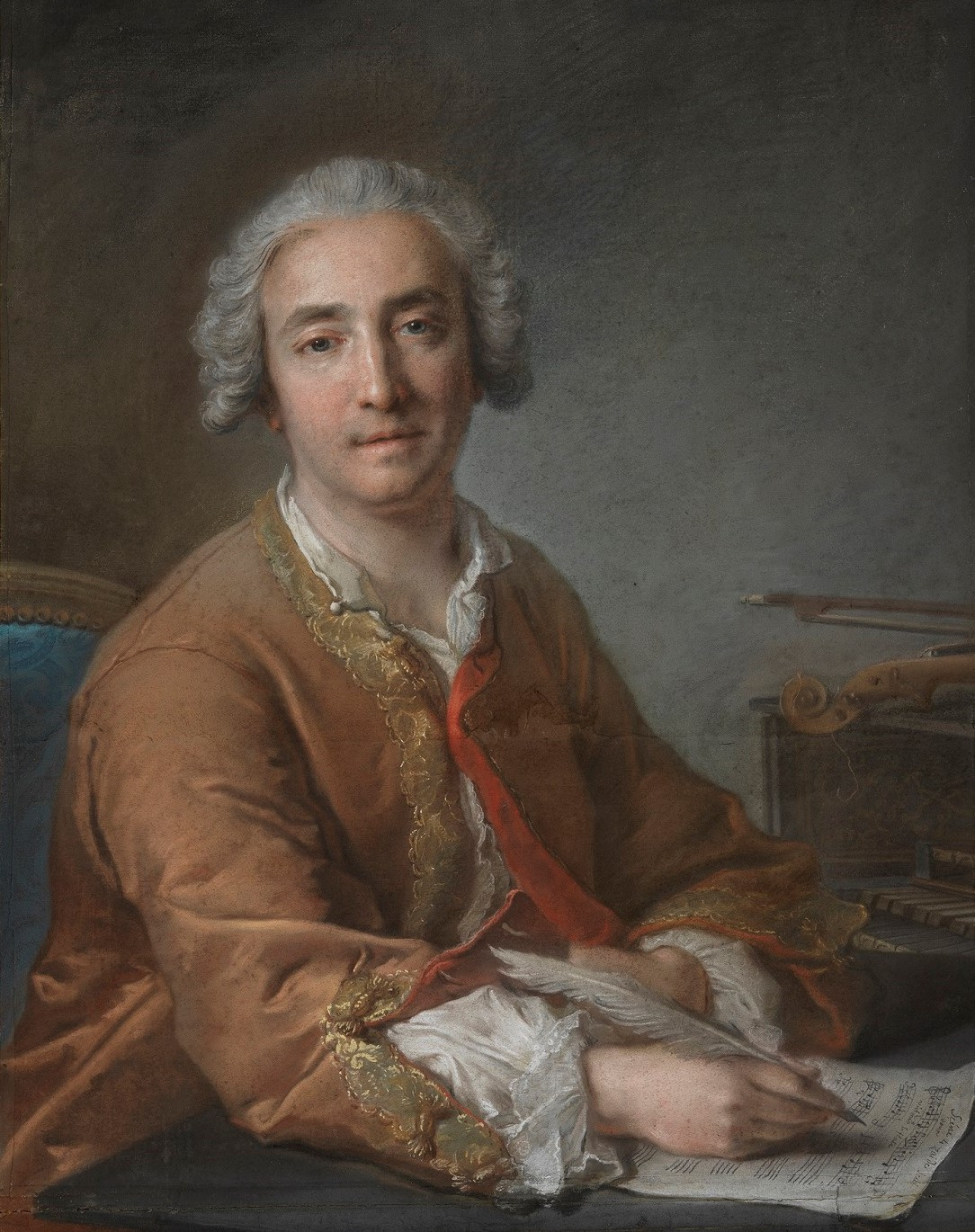
Royer composing his opera Zaïde (1750, Jean-Marc Nattier)

Joseph-Nicolas-Pancrace Royer (12 May 1703 – 11 January 1755) was a French Baroque composer, harpsichordist, organist, and administrator.

== Biography ==
Born in Turin, Royer went to Paris in 1725, and in 1734 became maître de musique des enfants de France, responsible for the musical education of the children of the king, Louis XV. Together with the violinist Jean-Joseph de Mondonville, Royer directed the Concerts Spirituels starting in 1748. Royer was at the Paris Opéra during the 1730s and the 1750s, writing six operas himself, of which the best known is the ballet héroïque Zaïde, reine de Grenade. In 1753, he acquired the prestigious position of music director of the chambre du roi (the king's chamber), and in the same year was named director of the Royal Opera orchestra. He died in Paris in 1755, at the age of 51.

== Works ==
Royer is particularly known for his often extravagant and virtuosic harpsichord music, especially "La Marche des Scythes", which ends his first book of harpsichord pieces.

=== Operas ===
Title	Genre	Subdivisions	Libretto	Première date	Place, theatre
Le fâcheux veuvage (contributions)	opéra comique	3 acts	Alexis Piron	September 1725	Paris, Foire St Laurent
Crédit est mort (contributions)	opéra comique	1 act	Alexis Piron	February 1726	Paris, Foire St Germain
Pyrrhus	tragédie lyrique	prologue and 5 acts	Fermelhuis	26 October 1730	Paris, Académie Royale de Musique
Zaïde, reine de Grenade	ballet héroïque	prologue and 3 acts	Abbé de La Marre	5 September 1739	Paris, Opéra
Le pouvoir de l'Amour	ballet héroïque	prologue and 3 acts	C-H Le Febvre de Saint-Marc	23 April 1743	Paris, Académie Royale de Musique
Prométhée et Pandore	tragédie	5 acts	Voltaire	composed 1744–54, private rehearsal 5 October 1752	Paris
Almasis	acte de ballet	1 act	François-Augustin de Paradis de Moncrif	26 February 1748	Versailles
Myrtil et Zélie	pastorale-héroïque	prologue and 1 act		20 June 1750	Versailles

=== Other works ===
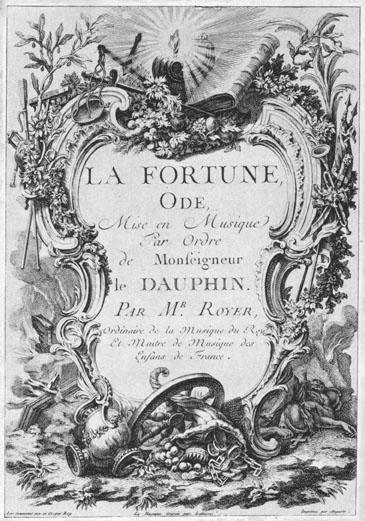
Frontpage to Ode à la fortune, 1747

- 1746: Premier livre de pièces de clavecin (1746)
1. La Majestueuse, courante
2. La Zaïde, rondeau (Tendrement)
3. Les Matelots (Modérément)
4. Premier et deuxième tambourins, suite des Matelots
5. L'Incertaine (Marqué)
6. L'Aimable (Gracieux)
7. La Bagatelle
8. Suitte de la Bagatelle
9. La Rémouleuse, rondeau (Modérément)
10. Les tendre Sentiments, rondeau
11. Le Vertigo, rondeau (Modérément)
12. Allemande
13. La Sensible, rondeau
14. La marche des Scythes (Fièrement)
- La chasse de Zaïde (1739)
- 1746: Ode à la fortune, text by Jean-Baptiste Rousseau, (first performance 25 December 1746, Concert Spirituel)
- 1751: Venite exultemus, motet (first performance 18 December 1751, Concert Spirituel)

== Recordings ==
- Vertigo - Jean Rondeau (harpsichord), a collection of pieces from Royer's first book of harpsichord pieces and from contemporary harpsichord composer Jean-Philippe Rameau, 2016
- Complete Harpsichord Music – Yago Mahugo (harpsichord), OnClassical (OC67B) licensed for Brilliant Classics (BC 94479), 2013
- Pièces de Clavecin – William Christie (harpsichord), Harmonia Mundi France (HM1901037), recorded 1979, CD-release 1992 (out of print)
- Ode de la Fortune 1746, Guillaume Durand (singer), Almazis-Iakovos Pappas dir. Iakovos Pappas, Jean-Baptiste Rousseau Poésies mises en musique.MAG 358.427, 2020).
