= Jean-Baptiste-Louis Gresset =

French poet and dramatist (1709–1777)

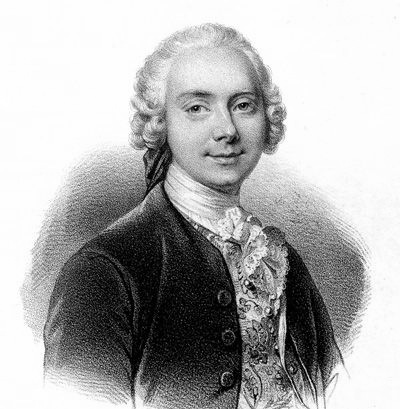

Jean-Baptiste-Louis Gresset (August 29, 1709 – June 16, 1777) was a French poet and dramatist, best known for his poem Vert-Vert.

== Life ==
Gresset was born at Amiens. During the last twenty-five years of his life, he regretted the frivolity of his youth, which enabled him to produce his most famous poem. He was brought up by the Jesuits of Amiens. Accepted as a novice at the age of seventeen, he was sent to study at the Collège Louis le Grand in Paris. After completing his course he was appointed, at the age of nineteen, to a post as assistant master in a college at Rouen.

Gresset published Vert-Vert at Rouen in 1734. It is the humorous story of a parrot, the delight of a convent whose talk was all of prayers and pious ambitions, and how it was conveyed to another convent as a visitor to please the nuns. On the way it falls among bad companions, forgets its convent language, and shocks the sisters on arrival by profane swearing. It is sent back in disgrace, punished by solitude and plain bread, repents, reforms and is finally killed by kindness. The treatment of the subject, the atmosphere which surrounds it, and the delicacy with which the little prattling ways of the nuns, their jealousies and trifling concerns, are presented, takes the reader entirely by surprise. The poem stands absolutely unrivalled, even among French contes en vers.

Gresset, now famous, left Rouen for Paris, where he found refuge in the same garret which had sheltered him when a boy at the Collège Louis le Grand, and there wrote his second poem, La Chartreuse. It was followed by the Carême impromptu, the Lutrin vivant and Les Ombres. Soon, complaints were made to the fathers of the alleged licentiousness of his verses, the real cause of complaint being the ridicule which Vert-Vert seemed to throw upon the religious community and the anti-clerical tendency of the other poems. Gresset was transferred to the Jesuit school of La Flèche, and soon after (30 September 1735) left the Order, without having been ordained priest. Gresset, who had never been taught to stand alone, was devastated: he wrote a moving Adieux aux Jésuites.

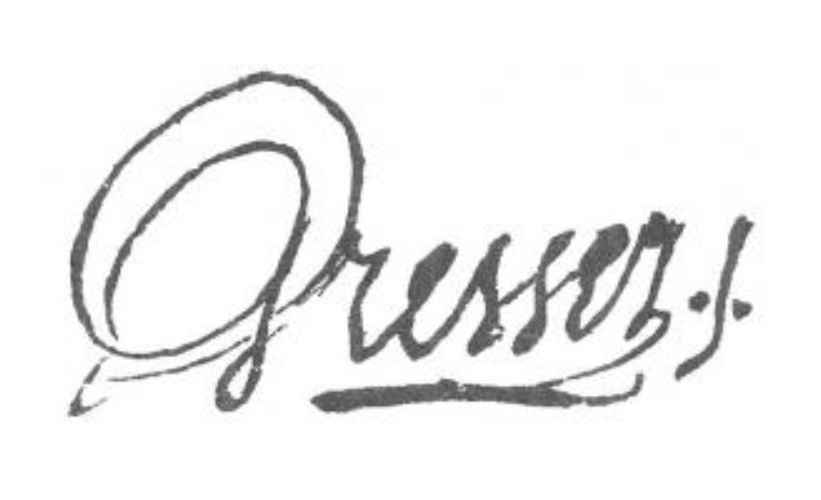

He went to Paris in 1740 and there produced Edouard III, a tragedy (1740) and Sidnei (1745), a comedy. These were followed by Le Méchant which was qualified by Ferdinand Brunetière as the best verse comedy of the French 18th century theatre, even surpassing the Métromanie of Alexis Piron. Gresset was admitted to the Académie française in 1748. After his marriage, in 1751, to the daughter of a former mayor of Amiens, he withdrew to that city, where he carried on his literary activities through the 'Académie d'Amiens' which he had founded. However, going through a moral crisis and religious awakening he disowned the more frivolous writings of the past.

He died at Amiens on the 16 June 1777.

== Works ==
- 1734: Vert-Vert, histoire d’un perroquet de Nevers
- 1734: Le Carème impromptu
- 1734: Le Lutrin vivant
- 1734: La Chartreuse
- 1734: Ombres
- 1740: Édouard III, tragedy, 22 January
- 1745: Sidney, drame en vers, 3 May
- 1747: Le Méchant, comédie en 5 actes, en vers, 15 April
- 1810: Le Parrain magnifique, poème en dix chants
- Correspondance avec Frédéric le Grand

== Bibliography ==
- Louis-Nicolas de Cayrol, Essai historique sur la vie et les ouvrages de Gresset, Amiens, 1844
- J. Wogue, Jean-Baptiste Gresset; sa vie et ses œuvres, Paris, 1894
- P.G. Salazar, Le Théâtre de Gresset : reflet d'une époque, thèse de doctorat, Paris, 1977
- S. Lenel, Voltaire et Gresset, Paris, 1889; éd. Nabu Press, 2010
