= François-Augustin de Paradis de Moncrif =

French writer and poet

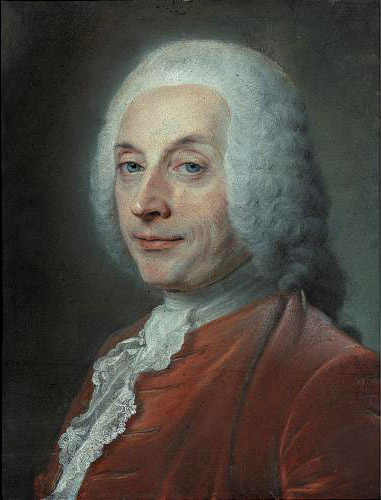
Portrait of Paradis de Moncrif by Maurice Quentin de La Tour

François-Augustin de Paradis de Moncrif (1687, Paris – 19 November 1770, Paris) was a French writer and poet, of a family originally of Scots origin. He was appointed historiographer royal to King Louis XV. His parody of owlishly pedantic scholarship, Histoire des chats, and the protection of the house of Orléans gained him entry to the Académie française. Maurepas records in his memoirs that at the induction ceremony, a member let loose a cat he had secreted in his pocket: the cat miaowed, the Académiciens miaowed and the serious oration dissolved in laughter.

== Works ==
- Les Aventures de Zeloïde et d'Amanzarifdine, contes indiens, 1715
- La Fausse magie, prose comedy in 3 acts, Comédie Italienne, 1719
- L'Oracle de Delphes, verse comedy in 3 acts, Comédie-Française, 1722; adapted from La Fontaine's Le Mari confesseur, it was interdicted at the fourth performance, its satire against paganism appearing to be applicable to the Christian religion.
- Histoire des Chats : dissertation sur la prééminence des chats dans la société, sur les autres animaux d'Égypte, sur les distinctions et privilèges dont ils ont joui personnellement, 1727
- Les Abdérites, verse comedy in 1 act, 1732
- L'Empire de l'Amour, ballet en vers libres, 1733
- Essais sur la Necessité et sur les Moyens de Plaire, 1738
- Les Ames rivales, novel 1738
- Œuvres mêlées, 1743
- Zélindor, roi des Sylphes, ballet libretto, music by François Francœur and François Rebel, presented at Versailles 17 March 1745
- Poésies chrétiennes composées par ordre de la Reine, 1747
- Almasis, ballet, 1748
- Ismène, pastorale héroïque, 1748
- Observations pour servir à l'histoire des gens de lettres qui ont vécu dans ce siècle, 1751
- La Sybille, ballet music by Antoine Dauvergne presented at Versailles, 13 November 1753
- Enée et Lavinie (with Bernard le Bovier de Fontenelle), lyric tragedy in 5 actst music by Antoine Dauvergne, presented at the Académie royale de musique, 14 February 1758
- Les Fêtes d'Euterpe (with Charles-Simon Favart), opera-ballet, music by Antoine Dauvergne, presented at the Académie royale de musique, 8 August 1758
- Erosine, pastorale héroïque, 1765
