= Philippe Néricault Destouches =

French playwright (1680–1754)

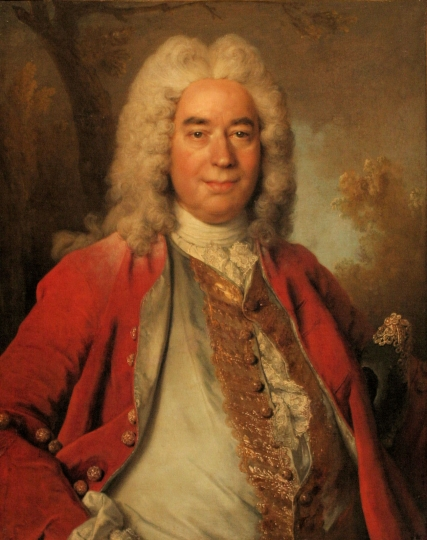
Portrait of Philippe Néricault Destouches by Nicolas de Largillière (1741).

Philippe Néricault Destouches (9 April 1680 – 4 July 1754) was a French playwright who wrote 22 plays.

== Biography ==
Destouches was born at Tours, Touraine (in today's department of Indre-et-Loire).

When he was nineteen years of age, he became secretary to M. de Puysieux, the French ambassador to Switzerland. In 1716 he was attached to the French embassy in London, where he remained for six years under abbé Dubois.

He later contracted a marriage with Dorothea Johnston, Lancashire lady; however, the marriage was not avowed for some years. In 1727 he portrayed his domestic circumstances in Le Philosophe Marié (The Married Philosopher).

Upon returning to France in 1723, he was elected to the Académie française. In 1727 he acquired considerable estates, the possession of which conferred the privileges of nobility.

He spent his later years at Fortoiseau, his chateau near Melun, and died on 4 July 1754.

Destouches wished to revive the comedy of character as understood by Molière, but he thought it desirable that the moral should be directly expressed.

His early comedies were:

- Le Curieux Impertinent (1710)
- L'Ingrat (1712)
- L'Irrésolu (1713)
- Le Médisant (1715)
- La Fausse Veuve (1715)
- Le Triple Mariage (1716)
- L'Obstacle Imprévu (1717)

The most highly regarded of these is L'Irrésolu (The Irresolute Man), in which Dorante, after vacillating throughout the play between Julie and Célimène, marries Julie, but concludes the play with the reflection, "J'aurais mieux fait, je crois, d'épouser Célimène" ("I would have done better, I think, to marry Célimène").

After eleven years of diplomatic service, Destouches returned to the stage in 1727 with Le Philosophe Marié, followed in 1730 by Les Philosophes Amoureux and in 1732 by Le Glorieux, a picture of the struggle then beginning between the old nobility and the wealthy parvenus who found opportunity in the poverty of France.

He then wrote:

- La Pupille (1734)
- L'Ambitieux et l'Indiscrète (1737)
- Les Dehor Trompeurs (1740)
- La Belle Orgueilleuse (1741)
- L'Amour Use (1741)
- Les Amours de Ragonde (1742)

His later comedies were:

- La Force du Naturel (1750)
- Le Jeune Homme á l'Épreuve (1751)
- Le Dissipateur (1753)

His last three plays were produced posthumously. They were:

- La Fausse Agnès (1759)
- Le Tambour Nocturne (1762)
- L'Homme Singulier (1764, his last play)

== Memorable phrase ==
Destouches's 1717 dramatic comedy L'Obstacle Imprévu (Act I, sc. vi) was the origin of the oft-quoted maxim, “The absent are always in the wrong.” Bergen Evans, in his Dictionary of Quotations, said:

“Though Néricault ... is credited with the first statement of this thought in this form, the idea is old and, in other forms, universal.”

In Le Glorieux he wrote "To critic is easy, only the art is difficult".

Preceded by Jean Galbert de Campistron	Seat 6 Académie française 1723–1754	Succeeded by Louis de Boissy
