= Céphale et Procris (Grétry) =

Opera by André Grétry

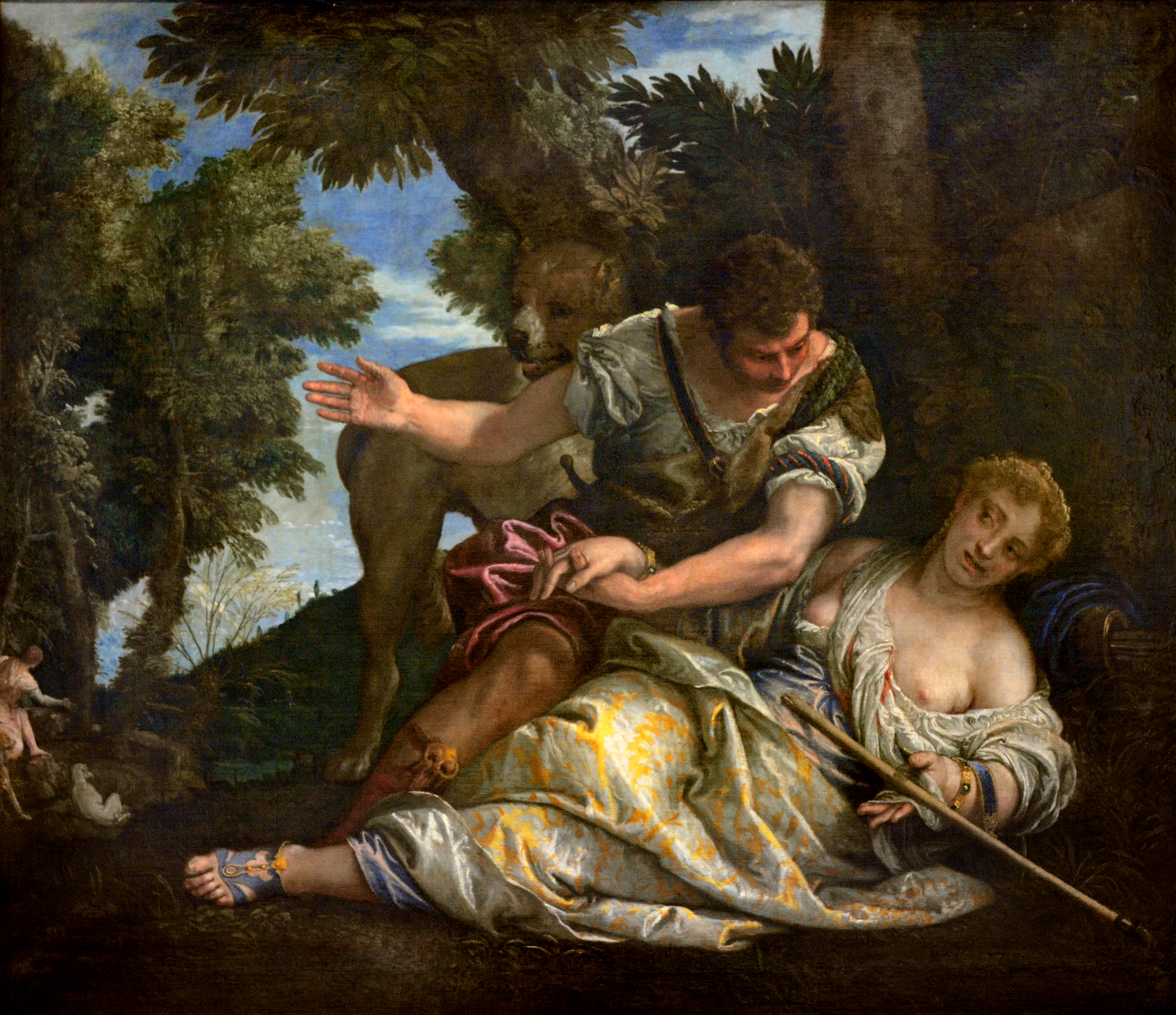
Cephalus and Procris

Céphale et Procris (Cephalus and Procris) is an opera by André Grétry with a French-language libretto by Jean-François Marmontel based on the Classical myth of Cephalus and Procris as told in Book Seven of Ovid's Metamorphoses. It takes the form of a ballet héroïque in three acts. It was first performed at the Palace of Versailles on 30 December 1773.

== Performance history ==
Céphale et Procris was first given at Versailles on 30 December 1773 as part of the royal wedding celebrations of the Comte d'Artois (the third grandson of King Louis XV) and Princess Maria Theresa of Savoy. It was not well received as the audience found the music too modern. It was revived at the Académie royale de musique (the Paris Opéra) on 2 May 1775, where it ran for 12 performances. Again, the reception was poor, with critics focussing on the inadequacies of Marmontel's libretto. A revival in May 1777 was more successful, with a total of 26 performances.

== Music and libretto ==
Céphale et Procris was part of a movement to introduce a more Italianate style of writing recitative, arias and ensembles into serious French opera. It thus has much in common with such contemporary works as Philidor's Ernelinde, princesse de Norvège (1767) and Gossec's Sabinus (1773), both of which were also played during the Comte d'Artois' wedding festivities.

Although Marmontel described the opera as a ballet héroïque, the musicologist Benoït Dratwicki writes that Céphale et Procris does not really fit the genre as conceived earlier in the 18th century. Rather, it is closer to tragédie lyrique and even contains elements which look forward to Romanticism.

== Roles ==
| Role | Voice type | Premiere cast, 30 December 1773 |
|---|---|---|
| Céphale (Cephalus) | baritone | Henri Larrivée |
| Procris | soprano | Sophie Arnould |
| Aurore (Aurora) | soprano | Marie-Jeanne Larrivée |
| Palès (Pales) | soprano | |
| Flore (Flora) | soprano | Rosalie Levasseur |
| La Jalousie (Jealousy) | soprano | Mlle Duplant |
| L'Amour (Cupid) | soprano | |

== Synopsis ==
=== Act 1 ===
Scene: A forest
Procris is a nymph who once followed the goddess Diana but she abandoned this way of life after falling in love with the hunter Cephalus. Aurora, goddess of the dawn, is also in love with Cephalus and plots to eliminate her rival. She disguises her identity and prophesies that Cephalus will become an instrument of Diana's vengeance and kill Procris. To avoid this fate, Cephalus runs away from Procris.

=== Act 2 ===
Scene: Aurora's palace
Cephalus takes refuge in Aurora's palace but the goddess's promises of a life of bliss fail to seduce him from his unwavering love for Procris.

=== Act 3 ===
Scene: A desolate place in the middle of a forest
Jealousy torments Procris with fears that Cephalus has deserted her. Cephalus is out hunting. As he approaches, Procris hides in the undergrowth to eavesdrop on him. Mistaking her sighs for the sounds of an animal, Cephalus shoots her with an arrow and mortally wounds her. Diana's vengeance is fulfilled. But Cupid descends from the heavens, revives Procris and grants the couple immortality.

== Recordings ==
=== Complete opera ===
- Céphale et Procris, Pierre-Yves Pruvot (Céphale), Katia Vellétaz (Procris), Les Agrémens et le Chœur de Chambre de Namur, conducted by Guy Van Waas (Ricercar, 2 CDs, 2010)

=== Ballet suite ===
- On Grétry: Suites and Overtures, Orchestre de Bretagne, conducted by Stefan Sanderling (ASV 1 CD, 2001)
- Gretry: Céphale et Procris, Suite (arranged by Constant Lambert). On 'The Decca Recordings', New Symphony Orchestra, London Symphony Orchestra, Robert Irving (2018 - originally recorded 1955)

== Sources ==
- Benoït Dratwicki, booklet notes to the Guy Van Waas recording
- Michel Brenet, Grétry: sa vie et ses œuvres (F. Hayez, Brussels, 1884)
