= Mademoiselle Beaumesnil =

French opera singer and composer (1748-1813)

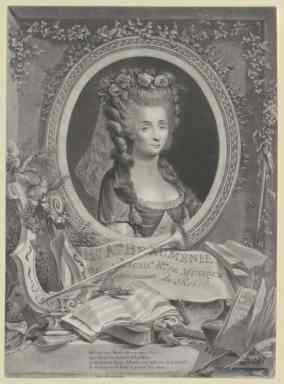
Henriette Adélaïde Villard, known as Mlle Beaumesnil

Henriette Adélaïde Villard or Henriette-Adélaïde de Villars, known under the stage name of Mlle Beaumesnil (30 August 1748 – 5 October 1813), was a French opera singer and composer.

== Biography ==
Mlle Beaumesnil began working in minor comedy roles from the age of seven and debuted as a soloist at the Paris Opera in 1766, substituting for the primadonna Sophie Arnould in the title role of Berton and Trial's Sylvie. She later sang in many premieres and revivals, patiently hoping that she would finally replace Arnould after her retirement.

When the latter left the company in 1778, however, Rosalie Levasseur was preferred and Beaumesnil protested publicly in a letter to the Journal de Paris on 27 December to the effect that she had suffered an act of injustice. She gave rise to a bitter quarrel, also managing to get some sort of compensation by being entrusted the female lead in Gluck's unsuccessful last opera Echo et Narcisse in September 1779, and did not carry out her threat to resign until 1781, when she finally left the stage.

Around the same period she married tenor "Philippe" (Philippe Cauvy, 1754-ca 1820), a celebrated member of the Opéra-Comique (or, to be precise, the Comédie Italienne). Concerning Mlle Beaumesnil's strong temperament, Émile Campardon also relates the story (maybe a legend) of her being involved in a 'duel au pistolet' with the dancer Mlle Théodore (born Marie-Madelaine Crepé, 1760–1796). The two women firmly refused the mediation efforts of the conductor of the Paris Opera orchestra Jean-Baptiste Rey who had turned up at the scene of the duel. They eventually got back the pistols he had taken over and laid down on the grass, and would begin the fight. The pistols however had got moist with dew and misfired, whereupon the two ladies decided to bury their differences by throwing their arms around each other's neck.

Mlle Beaumesnil wrote music from time to time and was the third woman to have a composition of hers performed at the Paris Opéra. Anacréon, her first opera, was not accepted and just received a private performance at the Brunoy residence of the Count of Provence in 1781. In 1784, however, she set again to music the libretto of the third entrée of Colin de Blamont's Les festes grecques et romaines, under the title of Tibulle et Délie, and her composition was successfully given at the Paris Opera to serve as a companion piece for Gluck's Iphigénie en Aulide on 15 March 1784. This is the only work of hers whose music has survived.

Later that same year, on 8 December, "her oratorio Les Israélites poursuivis par Pharaon——the only known oratorio of the century by a French woman—was given at the Concert Spirituel".

In 1792, her two-act opéra comique, Plaire, c'est commander was mounted at the Théâtre Montansier in Paris, after being previously rejected by the Théâtre Feydeau along with another one also set by Beaumesnil. It turned out nonetheless to be a fairly good success, running for 21 performances and being the fifth most-performed work of the year at the Théâtre Montansier.

Little more is known of what later happened to Mlle Beaumesnil during the course of the French Revolution. She died in Paris in 1813.

== Works ==
Selected works include:

- Anacréon, one-act opera, 1781
- Tibulle et Délie ou Les Saturnales, acte de ballet, 1784 (libretto by Louis Fuzelier)
- Les Israëlites poursuivis par Pharaon, oratorio, 1784
- Plaire, c'est commander, two-act opéra comique, 1792 (libretto by Marquis de la Salle)
