= Henri Larrivée =

French opera singer (1737–1802)

Henri Larrivée (9 January 1737 – 7 August 1802) was a French opera singer. He was born in Lyon. His voice range was basse-taille (equivalent to baritone). According to Fétis, Larrivée was working as an apprentice to a wigmaker when the head of the Paris Opéra, Rebel, noticed his talent for singing and hired him as a chorus member. He made his first solo appearance as a high priest in a 1755 revival of Rameau's Castor et Pollux. He was particularly associated with the works of Christoph Willibald Gluck, helping Gluck establish his "reform operas" in France. He found Gluck's rival, Niccolò Piccinni, less congenial but still worked with him on the premieres of operas including Roland (1778). After already getting a pension in 1779, he retired from the Académie Royale de Musique in 1786 and devoted most of the time he had left to live to tour around with his two daughters, Camille (later known as Mme Delaval) and Henriette, who played respectively harp and violin.

The 19th-century writer Émile Campardon described Larrivée thus: "The artist, who had everything – a good figure, a wide range, a flexible voice, and acting that was both natural and intelligent – deserved the applause he received over a career spanning more than thirty years. Almost every new work in which he appeared was a success." Fétis claimed that Larrivée had a tendency to turn nasal on high notes and quoted a joke from a member of the audience: "There's a nose with a good voice!"

Larrivée was married to the soprano Marie-Jeanne Lemière (1733—1786), later known as Madame Larrivée.

== Roles created ==
Larrivée was the first singer to perform the following parts:

- Apollon in Les surprises de l'Amour (by Rameau, 1757)
- The king in Énée et Lavinie (by Dauvergne, 1758)
- Orcan in Les Paladins (by Rameau, 1760)
- The Druid in Le prince de Noisy (by Rebel and Francœur, 1760)
- Jealousy in Polixène (by Dauvergne, 1763)
- Saint-Phar in Aline, reine de Golconde (by Monsigny, 1766)
- Vulcain in Sylvie (by Lagarde, 1766)
- Dorilas in Théonis ou le toucher (Act 2 of Les fragments nouveaux, by Berton and Trial, 1767)
- The chief of the savages in Amphion (Act 3 of Les fragments nouveaux, by La Borde, 1767)
- Ricimer in Ernelinde, princesse de Norvège (by Philidor, 1767)
- Zerbin in La vénitienne (by Dauvergne, 1768)
- Alcide in Omphale (by Cardonne, 1769)
- Thémistée in Ismène et Isménias (by La Borde, 1770)
- Germain in La cinquantaine (by La Borde, 1771)
- Mars in Le prix de la valeur (by Dauvergne, 1771)
- Guillaume in Adèle de Ponthieu (by La Borde and Berton, 1772)
- Théophile (second entrée)/An old man (third entrée) in L'union de l'amour et des arts (by Floquet, 1773)
- Sabinus in Sabinus (by Gossec, 1773)
- Céphale in Céphale et Procris (by Grétry, 1773)
- Agamemnon in Iphigénie en Aulide (by Gluck, 1774)
- Alcindor in Azolan (by Floquet, 1774)
- Philémon in Philémon et Baucis (by Gossec, 1775)
- Hercule in Alceste (by Gluck, 1776)
- Eutyme in Eutyme et Lyris (by Desormery, 1776)
- Ubalde in Armide (by Gluck, 1777)
- Roland in Roland (by Piccinni, 1778)
- Oreste in Iphigénie en Tauride (by Gluck, 1779)
- Célœnus in Atys (by Piccinni, 1780)
- Oreste in Andromaque (by Grétry, 1780)
- Phinée in Persée (by Philidor, 1780)
- Julien in Le seigneur bienfaisant (by Floquet, 1780)
- Oreste in Iphigénie en Tauride (by Piccinni, 1781)
- The Count of Ponthieu in Adèle de Ponthieu (by Piccinni, 1781)
- Egée in Thésée (by Gossec, 1782)
- Oreste in Électre (by Lemoyne, 1782)
- Chrysante in L'embarras des richesses (by Gretry, 1782)
- Porus in Alexandre aux Indes (by Lefroid de Méreaux, 1783)
- Iarbe in Didon (by Piccinni, 1783)
- Florestan in La caravane du Caire (by Grétry, 1784)
- Danaüs in Les Danaïdes (by Salieri, 1784)
- Teucer in Dardanus (by Sacchini, 1784
- Ulysse in Pénélope (by Piccinni, 1785)

Larrivée was also due to play the role of Arcalaüs in Johann Christian Bach's Amadis de Gaule but was forced to withdraw for health reasons.

== Sources ==
- Benoît Dratwicki "The first performances of Amadis de Gaule" in the book accompanying the recording of J. C. Bach's
- Julian Rushton, article on Larrivée in The Grove Book of Opera Singers (Oxford University Press, 2008)
- François-Joseph Fétis, Biographie universelle des musiciens et bibliographie générale de la musique (1863 edition)
- Spire Pitou The Paris Opera: 1715–1815: Rococo and Romantic: An Encyclopedia of Operas, Ballets, Composers and Performers (Greenwood, 1985)
