= Sabinus (opera) =

Opera by the composer François-Joseph Gossec

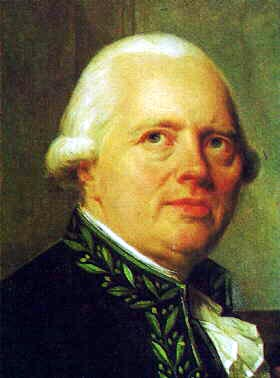
François-Joseph Gossec, by Antoine Vestier.

Sabinus is an opera by the composer François-Joseph Gossec. It originally took the form of a tragédie lyrique in five acts (later reduced to four). The French-language libretto, by Michel Paul Guy de Chabanon, concerns the revolt of the Gaulish nobleman Julius Sabinus and his wife Epponina (Éponine) against Roman rule. The opera had its first performance at Versailles on 4 December 1773 in the presence of King Louis XV, before transferring to the Paris Opéra on 22 February 1774. Sabinus was not a success, even in a revised four-act version, and was soon withdrawn. Assessments of the music has been mixed, but some modern critics share Gossec's view that Sabinus prefigures the revolution in operatic practice Christoph Willibald von Gluck would soon introduce to Paris.

== Composition ==
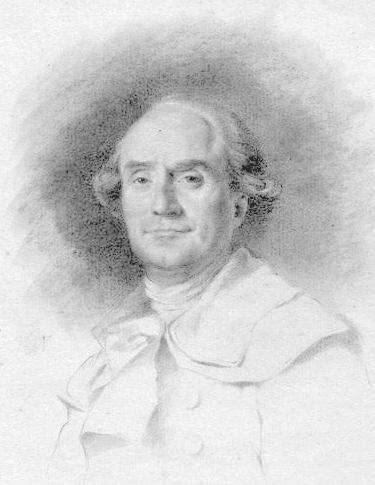
Michel Paul Guy de Chabanon, the librettist

Chabanon had written a play on the subject, Éponine, in 1762. He later transformed it into a tragedy, Sabinus, which was performed at the Comédie-Française in 1770, but audiences were unenthusiastic. Undiscouraged, Chabanon decided to turn the piece into a libretto for a tragédie lyrique, which he offered to Gossec the following year. The composer and Chabanon already knew one other because Chabanon was a violinist as well as an author. By the summer of 1773, the score was ready and went into rehearsal at the Théâtre des Menus Plaisirs on 8 June. Further rehearsals (there were nine in all) took place at the Opéra Royal de Versailles in November.

== Performance history and reception ==
The premiere took place at Versailles on 4 December 1773 in the presence of King Louis XV as part of the wedding celebrations of the Comte d'Artois and Princess Maria Theresa of Savoy. Despite the magnificent staging, the audience found the work too long and boring, although critics praised some of Gossec's music, particularly the ballet sections. Sabinus transferred to the Paris Opéra on 22 February 1774. By now, Gossec had decided to refashion the piece in line with the criticisms it had received and reduce it to four acts. But even the shortened version failed to please audiences and Sabinus was soon withdrawn. It had enjoyed 11 performances in all. Gossec's plans to revive Sabinus were thwarted by the arrival of Christoph Willibald Gluck on the Parisian scene. Gluck's Iphigénie en Aulide, which premiered in April 1774, changed the face of French opera for good and made Sabinus look obsolete (although Gossec later claimed that the innovations he had made in Sabinus had paved the way for Gluck's success).

An autograph score of the opera survives, but the music for the overture has been lost.

== Modern assessments: an innovative or conservative work? ==
Some modern critics have shared Gossec's contemporaries' lack of enthusiasm for Sabinus. In the opinion of Frédéric Hellouin, it failed to break free from its roots in late Baroque tragédie lyrique: "in spite of its serious qualities, Sabinus is far from being a masterpiece. Instead of genuine authority, we only feel the direct and overwhelming influence of Rameau and Mondonville." David J. Buch has dismissed it as "a tame, even conservative opera." Nevertheless, Sabinus is not simply derivative, but contains some innovative features, especially in its orchestration, as it was the first work presented at the Opéra to contain trombones. Gossec's own assessment of Sabinus, in a letter of 1803, made claims for its modernising tendencies. According to the composer, compared to previous operas, it offered "a more marked character, a brighter colouring, a more animated style, more varied, more modern and consequently more universal." The musicologist Benoît Dratwicki agrees with Gossec and sees Sabinus and Philidor's tragédie lyrique Ernelinde, princesse de Norvège (1767) - both showing strong Italianate influence - as the two key operas which helped to pave the way for the revolution in French musical theatre Gluck brought to Paris with Iphigénie en Aulide in 1774.

== Roles ==
Role	Voice type	Premiere
Sabinus, a Gaulish prince and grandson of Julius Caesar	baritone	Henri Larrivée
Éponine (Epponina), a Gaulish princess	soprano	Marie-Jeanne Larrivée Lemière
Mucien, a Roman, the governor of Gaul	haute-contre	Joseph Legros
The Genius of Gaul	bass	Durand
The Chief Druid	bass	Nicolas Gélin
Natalis, confidant of Sabinus	haute-contre	Muguet
Faustine, confidante of Éponine	soprano	Mlle Beaumesnil (stage name of Henriette Adélaïde de Villars)
Arbate, a Roman	bass	Beauvalet
A shepherd	haute-contre	Tirot
A foreign woman	soprano	Mlle Beaumesnil
Chorus of Gaulish people, Roman soldiers, Druids, shepherds and shepherdesses, peoples of different nations, followers of the Genius of Gaul

== Synopsis ==
Scene: the opera takes place at Langres in Gaul.

=== Act 1 ===
Scene: a public place
The young Gaulish nobleman Sabinus is looking forward to his wedding with his beloved Éponine. He tells his friend Natalis that he is planning a revolt against Roman rule too. The Roman governor, Mucien, has been acting tyrannically and has made advances towards Éponine. The wedding ceremony begins, but the celebrations are interrupted by the arrival of Arbate, who says that Mucien has forbidden the marriage to go ahead. Sabinus and Éponine decide to ignore the order and risk being sentenced to death by concluding the wedding. Shocked at Mucien's tyranny, the Gauls rebel.

=== Act 2 ===
Scene: a sacred forest, inhabited by Druids. An altar is in the middle. To the side there is a cave sealed with brass gates
Éponine escapes to the sacred forest of the Druids. Here she finds shepherds and shepherdesses who have taken refuge from the war. The Chief Druid enters the sacred cave to discover the will of the gods. The Romans, led by Mucien, arrive and take Éponine captive. On Mucien's orders, they cut down the sacred forest and smash the altar, intending to destroy the cult of the Druids.

=== Act 3 ===
Scene: a terrifying wilderness, rocks, precipices
Sabinus has been wounded in battle. He hears news of Éponine's capture and is desperate to rescue her. The Genius of Gaul appears and tells Sabinus that Éponine will be saved but Sabinus must first hide underground so everybody will think he is dead. To encourage Sabinus, the Genius offers him a vision of the future glory of Gaul: the Emperor Charlemagne is seen on his throne ruling the nations of Western Europe.

=== Act 4 ===
Scene: a view of Sabinus' palace and the tombs of his ancestors. The whole area is enclosed by walls.
Mucien leads Éponine to Sabinus's palace. He promises to save Sabinus' life if she divorces Sabinus and marries him instead. Éponine refuses and Mucien orders his soldiers to search the palace, but at that moment the building bursts into flames. Believing that Sabinus has been killed, Éponine collapses. The Genius of Gaul is seen in a flying chariot pouring "a rain of fire" onto the palace; soon nothing is left of the building but an altar with an urn on top. Éponine awakes and reads the inscription on the urn: it is a message from Sabinus claiming that these are his ashes. She curses Mucien.

=== Act 5 ===
Scene: a dark underground crypt where the princes of Gaul are buried
Sabinus is in hiding amid the tombs of his ancestors. The thought of his love for Éponine gives him courage. He hears a chorus of voices approaching and hides in the tomb which bears his name. Éponine and her followers arrive bringing the urn for burial. After the funeral, she plans to kill herself. She is shocked when she thinks she hears a groan from the tomb. Mucien arrives to try to prevent Éponine committing suicide. At the very moment Éponine threatens to stab herself, Sabinus emerges from the tomb and attacks Mucien.

Scene: a public place
Sabinus has killed Mucien. He spares the lives of the other Romans he has captured. The Genius of Gaul descends to give his blessing to a general celebration of the restoration of his people's freedom.

== Recordings ==
There is no complete recording of the opera, but extracts from the ballet music appear on two recordings by the conductor Guy Van Waas: the DVD La Petite Musique de Marie-Antoinette (Armide, 2006) and the CD Gossec: Trois grandes symphonies (Ricercar, 2011).

== Sources ==
- (in French) Claude Role François-Joseph Gossec (1734-1829): un musicien à Paris de l'Ancien Régime à Charles X (Harmattan, 2000)
- (in French) Frédéric Hellouin François-Joseph Gossec et la musique française à la fin du XVIII siècle (A.Charles, 1903)
- (in French) Original libretto available online at Google Books
- David J. Buch Magic Flutes and Enchanted Forests: The Supernatural in Eighteenth-Century Musical Theater (University of Chicago Press, 2009)
