= Marie-Jeanne Larrivée Lemière =

French soprano (1733–1786)

Marie-Jeanne Larrivée, born Marie-Jeanne Lemière (1733–1786) was a French soprano.

== Biography ==
Marie-Jeanne Larrivée was a prominent member of the Paris Opera company, where she made her debut in 1750 under the name of Mlle Lemière (also spelt Lemierre or Le Mière). She was the sister of violinist Jacques Lemière and cellist Jacques-Louis Lemière both engaged at the Paris Opera in the same period. Her parents were Louis-Michel Lemière, a wig maker, and Julienne Lemière.

After performing several light roles as a cover, at the beginning of 1752 Lemière left the theater scene. She probably intended to improve her voice, but her five-year absence from the stage was mainly related to her stormy relationship with the Duke of Gramont, whose abusive behaviour, even bordering on rape, darkened this period of her life. In July 1752 she gave birth to her first daughter, Marie-Antoinette, but neither of the parents acknowledged her, and only her grandfather offered himself as godfather. In 1756 she finally managed to break up with the Duke and the following year she was readmitted to the Opéra with increased salary.

The parts played by Mlle Lemière included roles in the operas Silvie, Omphale (Cardonne), Ovide et Julie (as Julie), Salimes and Céphale et Procris (Grétry). Larrivée-Lemière retired from the theater in 1777. In 1762 she had married her partner, Henri Larrivée, and had two daughters: pianist, harpsichordist and composer Camille Larrivée and violinist Agathe Elisabeth Henriette Larrivée. In 1767, the Larrivées separated. Their two daughters went on to live with their aunt and guardian, Elisabeth-Henriette Larrivée and toured through French provinces in concerts.

Marie-Jeanne Larrivée-Lemière was also considered one of the most esteemed singers of the Concert Spirituel, where she regularly performed between 1750 and 1763, and then more irregularly until 1778, when she retired with a pension of 2,000 francs annually.

== Roles debuted ==
Opera	Composer	Role(s)	Date of premiere	Location
Thésée (Mondonville)	Jean-Joseph de Mondonville	The high priestess, Minerva; a woman from Athens; a shepherdess, from an enchanted island	7 November 1765	Fontainebleau
Les Paladins	Rameau	Nérine	12 February 1760	Paris Opera
Canente (Dauvergne)	Antoine Dauvergne	Canente	11 November 1760	Paris Opera
Énée et Lavinie (Dauvergne)	Antoine Dauvergne	Venus; Iris	14 February 1758	Paris Opera
Anacréon	Rameau	Chloë	1766	Versailles
Acante et Céphise	Rameau	Un'autre bergère	19 November 1751	Paris Opera
Les fêtes de Paphos	Jean-Joseph de Mondonville	Aglaé (act 1); Amour (act 2)	9 May 1758	Paris Opera
Sabinus (opera)	François-Joseph Gossec	Éponine	4 December 1773	Versailles; in presence of King Louis XV
Hippolyte et Aricie (revision of 1757)	Rameau	Une matelote, une bergère, une chasseresse	1757	Versailles; in presence of King Louis XV
Ernelinde, princesse de Norvège	François-André Philidor	Erneline	24 November 1767	Paris Opera
Théonis ou Le Toucher	Jean-Claude Trial and Pierre-Montan Berton	Théonis	13 October 1767	Paris Opera
Titon et l'Aurore	Jean-Joseph de Mondonville	L'Aurore	22 February 1763	Paris Opera
Silvie	Jean-Claude Trial and Pierre-Montan Berton	L'Amour	17 October 1765	Paris Opera
Le Carnaval de Parnasse	Jean-Joseph de Mondonville	Florine (prologue); Thalie	23 June 1767	Paris Opera
Ismène	François Rebel and François Francœur	Ismène	12 October 1769	Fontainebleau

== Sources ==
- Sylvie Bouissou, Larrivée, Marie-Jeanne Lemière, épouse, in id., Pascal Denécheau e France Marchal-Ninosque (eds), Dictionnaire de l'Opéra de Paris sous l'Ancien Régime (1669–1791), Paris, Classiques Garnier, 2019, III (H–O), pp. 397–400 ISBN 978-2406090656
- David Charlton Opera in the Age of Rousseau: Music, Confrontation, Realism, Cambridge University Press, 2012. (ISBN 1107504341)
- Félix Clément and Pierre Larousse Dictionnaire des Opéras, Paris, 1881. (ISBN 127338315X)
- "Marie-Jeanne Lemiere". Bibliotheque Nationale de France.
- Weller, Philip (2002). Lemière [Larrivée, L'Arrivée], Marie-Jeanne. doi:10.1093/gmo/9781561592630.article.O902827. ISBN 978-1561592630 – via Oxford Grove Music Online.
- Lemière, Marie-Jeanne, voir Larrivée (1733–1786) / Noms / Autres index / Parcourir / Accueil – Portail Philidor
- Dictionnaire de la musique en France aux XVIIe et XVIIIe siècles, sous la direction de Marcelle Benoit, édition Fayard, 1992. (ISBN 2213028249)
- Charles Dill Opera Remade, 1700–1750, University of Wisconsin, Madison, 2016. (ISBN 0754629007)
