= Armide (Gluck) =

1777 opera by Christoph Willibald Gluck

Armide is an opera by Christoph Willibald Gluck, set to a libretto by Philippe Quinault. Gluck's fifth production for the Parisian stage and the composer's own favourite among his works, it was first performed on 23 September 1777 by the Académie Royale de Musique in the second Salle du Palais-Royal in Paris.

== Background and performance history ==
Gluck set the same libretto Philippe Quinault had written for Lully in 1686, based on Torquato Tasso's Gerusalemme liberata (Jerusalem Delivered). Gluck seemed at ease in facing French traditions head-on when he composed Armide. Lully and Quinault were the very founders of serious opera in France and Armide was generally recognized as their masterpiece, so it was a bold move on Gluck's part to write new music to Quinault's words. A similar attempt to write a new opera to the libretto of Thésée by Jean-Joseph de Mondonville in 1765 had ended in disaster, with audiences demanding it be replaced by Lully's original. By utilizing Armide, Gluck challenged the long-standing and apparently inviolable ideals of French practice, and in the process he revealed these values capable of renewal through "modern" compositional sensitivities. Critical response and resultant polemic resulted in one of those grand imbroglios common to French intellectual life. Gluck struck a nerve in French sensitivities, and whereas Armide was not one of his more popular works, it remained a critical touchstone in the French operatic tradition and was warmly praised by Berlioz in his Memoirs. Gluck also set a minor fashion for resetting Lully/Quinault operas: Gluck's rival Piccinni followed his example with Roland in 1778 and Atys in 1780; in the same year, Philidor produced a new Persée; and Gossec offered his version of Thésée in 1782. Gluck himself is said to have been working on an opera based on Roland, but he abandoned it when he heard Piccinni had taken on the same libretto.

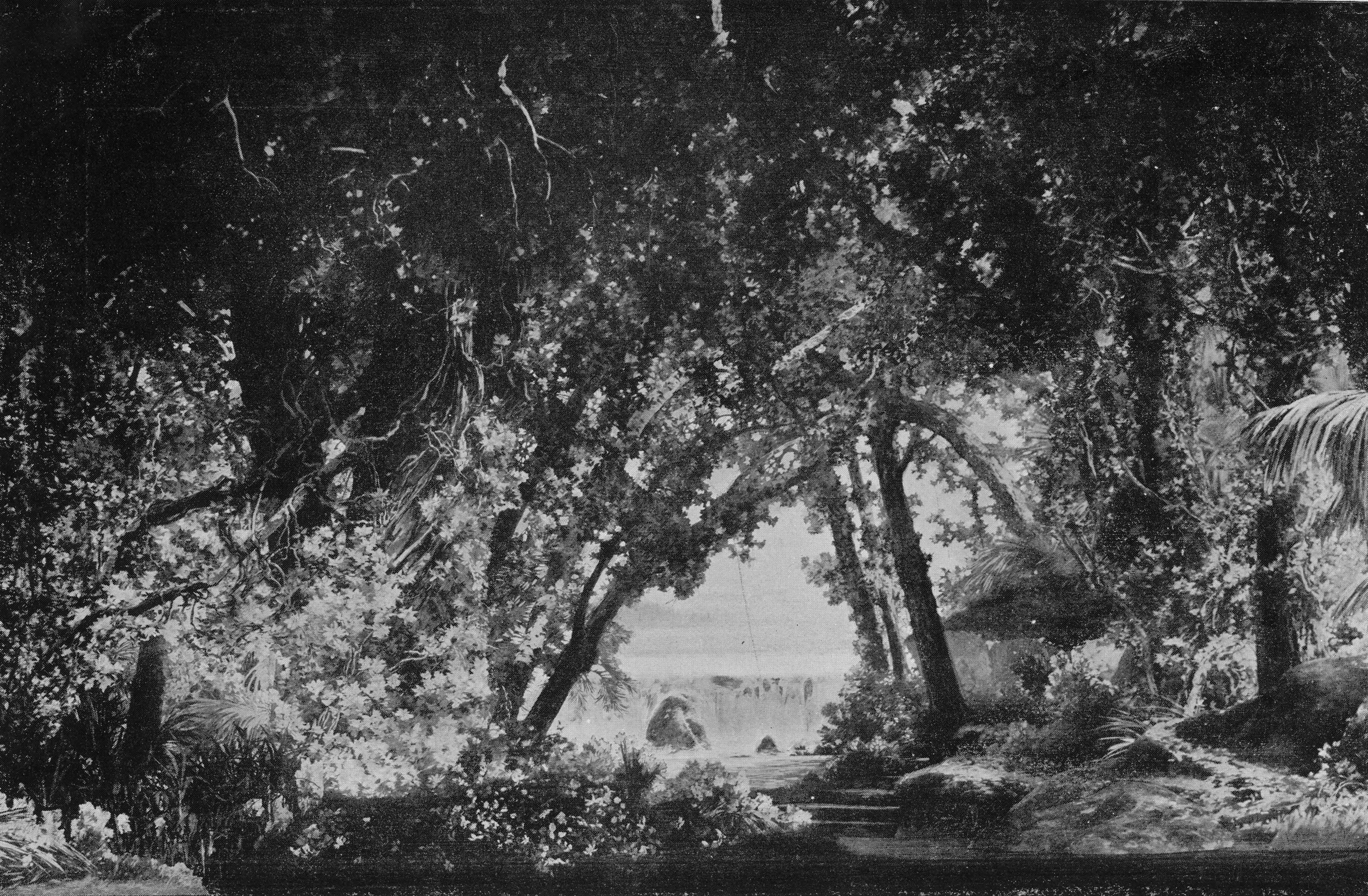
Sketch for the second acte, for a representation at the Paris Opera, 1905

Armide remained on the repertoire of the Parisian Académie Nationale de Musique throughout the late eighteenth and early nineteenth century, with revivals held in 1805, 1811, 1818, 1819 and 1825. A new production directed by Émile Perrin in 1866 featured sets by Édouard Desplechin (Act II), Auguste Alfred Rubé and Philippe Chaperon (Act III), and Charles-Antoine Cambon (Acts IV and V). Another big-budget production was staged at the Opéra on 12 April 1905, starring Lucienne Bréval in the title role, Alice Verlet, Agustarello Affre, Dinh Gilly, and Geneviève Vix. The costumes were designed by Charles Bianchini and Charles Bétout; the sets were by Cambon's student Eugène Carpezat (Act I), Amable (Acts II and V), and Marcel Jambon and Alexandre Bailly (Acts III and IV).

The Opéra's 1905 production was followed on 7 November 1905 by a big-budget staging at the Théâtre de la Monnaie in Brussels. Overseen by Gluck connoisseur François-Auguste Gevaert, it featured Félia Litvinne in the title role, costumes by the symbolist artist Fernand Khnopff, and eight sets by Albert Dubosq. Hugely successful, this sumptuous production enjoyed a first run of forty performances, with subsequent revivals in 1909, 1924 and 1948.

The Metropolitan Opera staged the work for the opening of its 1910–1911 season. Toscanini conducted a cast led by Olive Fremstad, Louise Homer and Enrico Caruso.

== Roles ==
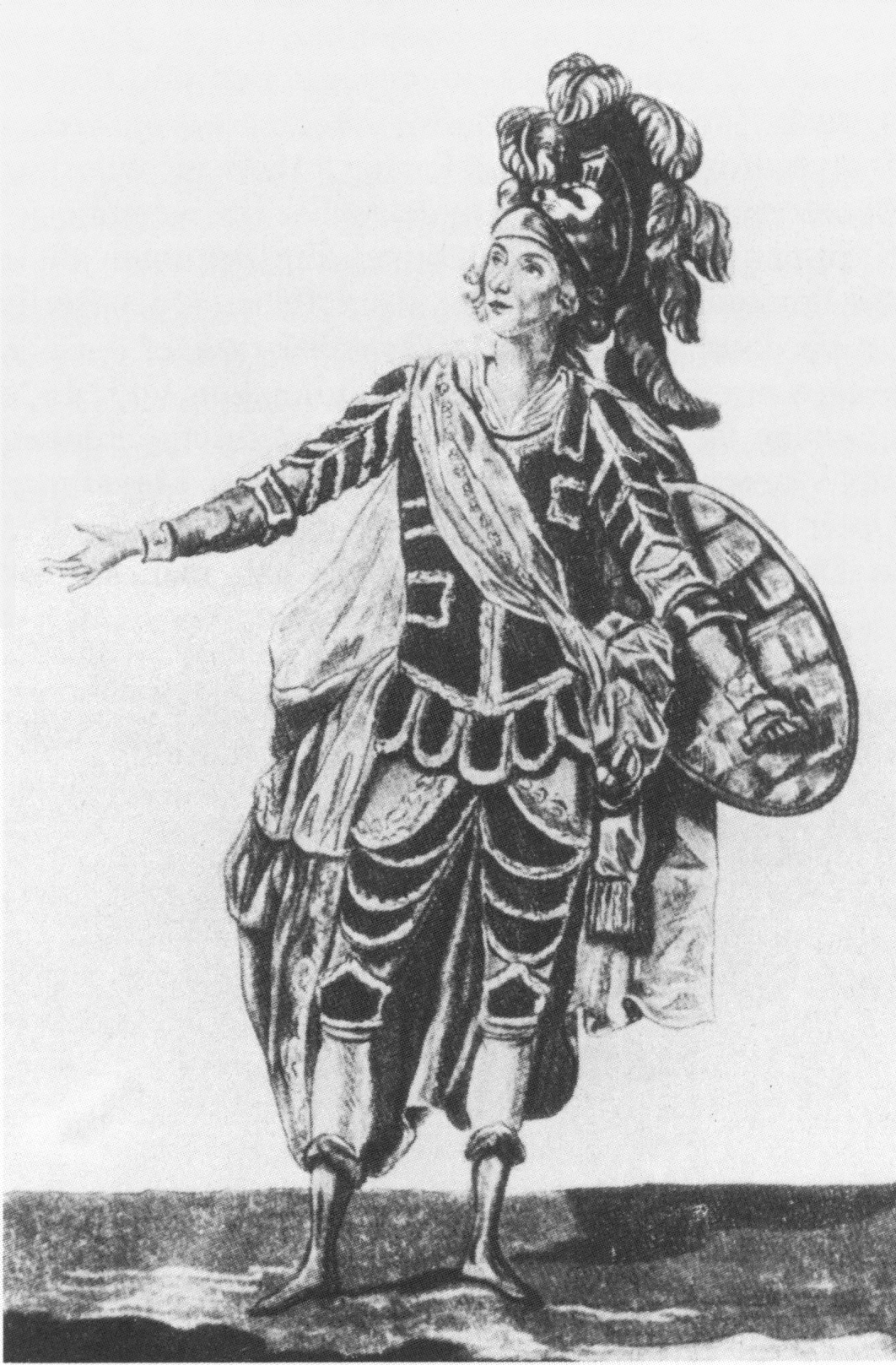
Jean-Joseph Rousseau as Renaud in Gluck's Armide, Paris c. 1780

Roles, voice types, premiere cast
Role	Voice type	Premiere cast, 23 September 1777 (Conductor)
Armide, a sorceress, Princess of Damascus	soprano	Rosalie Levasseur
Renaud, a Crusader	haute-contre	Joseph Legros
Phénice, Armide's confidant	soprano	M.lle LeBourgeois
Sidonie, Armide's confidant	soprano	M.lle Châteauneuf
Hidraot, a magician, King of Damascus	baritone	Nicolas Gélin
Hate	contralto	Céleste [Célestine] Durancy
The Danish Knight, a Crusader	tenor	Étienne Lainez (also spelled Lainé)
Ubalde, a Crusader	baritone	Henri Larrivée
A demon in the form of Lucinde, the Danish Knight's beloved	soprano	Anne-Marie-Jeanne Gavaudan "l'aînée"
A demon in the form of Mélisse, Ubalde's beloved	soprano	Antoinette Cécile de Saint-Huberty
Aronte, in charge of Armide's prisoners	baritone	Georges Durand
Artémidore, a Crusader	tenor	Thirot
A naiad	soprano	Anne-Marie-Jeanne Gavaudan "l'aînée"
A shepherdess	soprano	Anne-Marie-Jeanne Gavaudan "l'aînée"
A pleasure	soprano	Antoinette Cécile de Saint-Huberty
people of Damascus, nymphs, shepherds and shepherdesses, suite of Hate, demons, Pleasures, coryphaei

== Synopsis ==
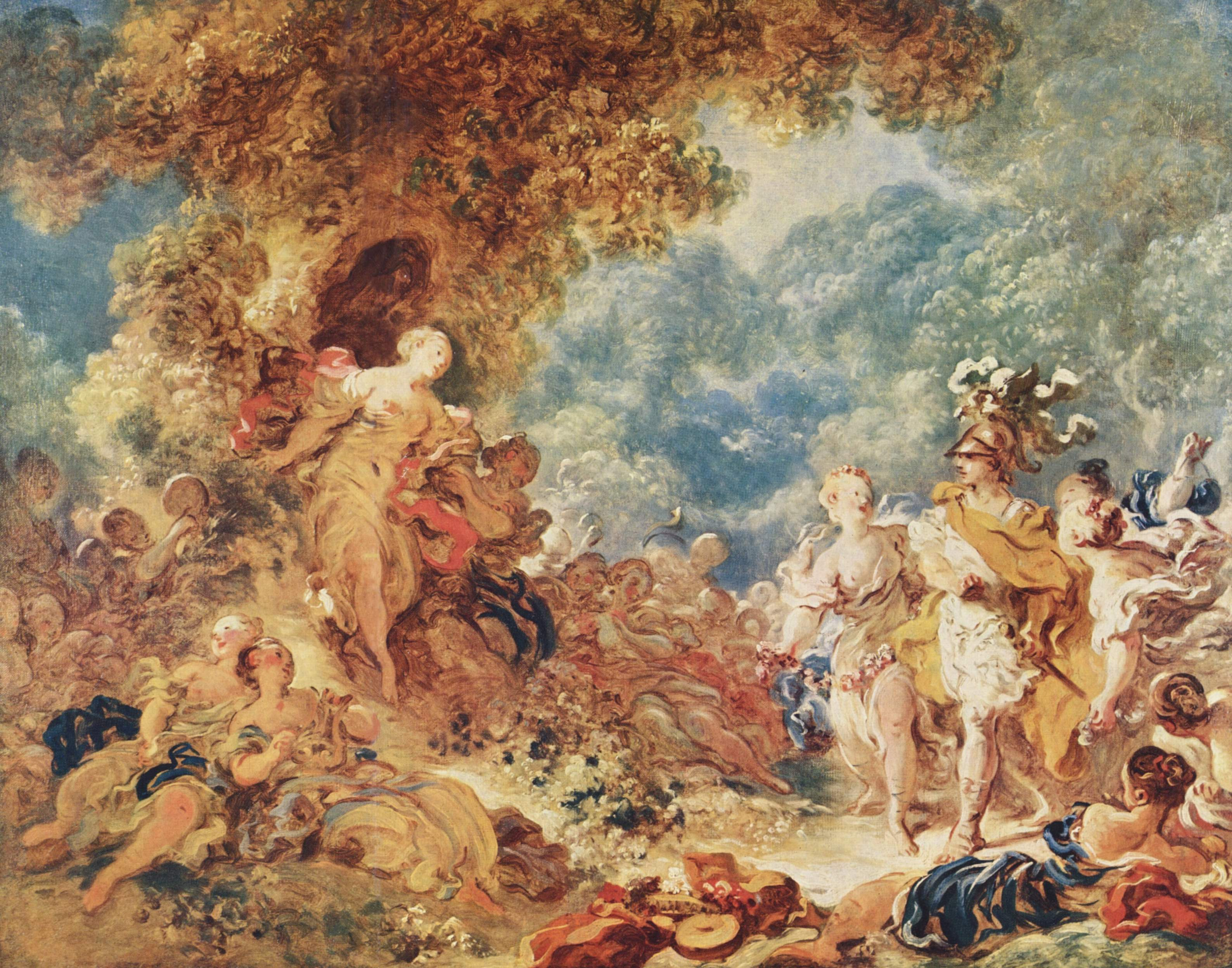
Rinaldo in the Garden of Armida (1763), painting by Fragonard

For the storyline, see Armide by Lully. Gluck kept the libretto unchanged, although he cut the allegorical prologue and added a few lines of his own devising to the end of Act Three. Similarly, the roles and the disposition of the voices are the same as in Lully's opera.

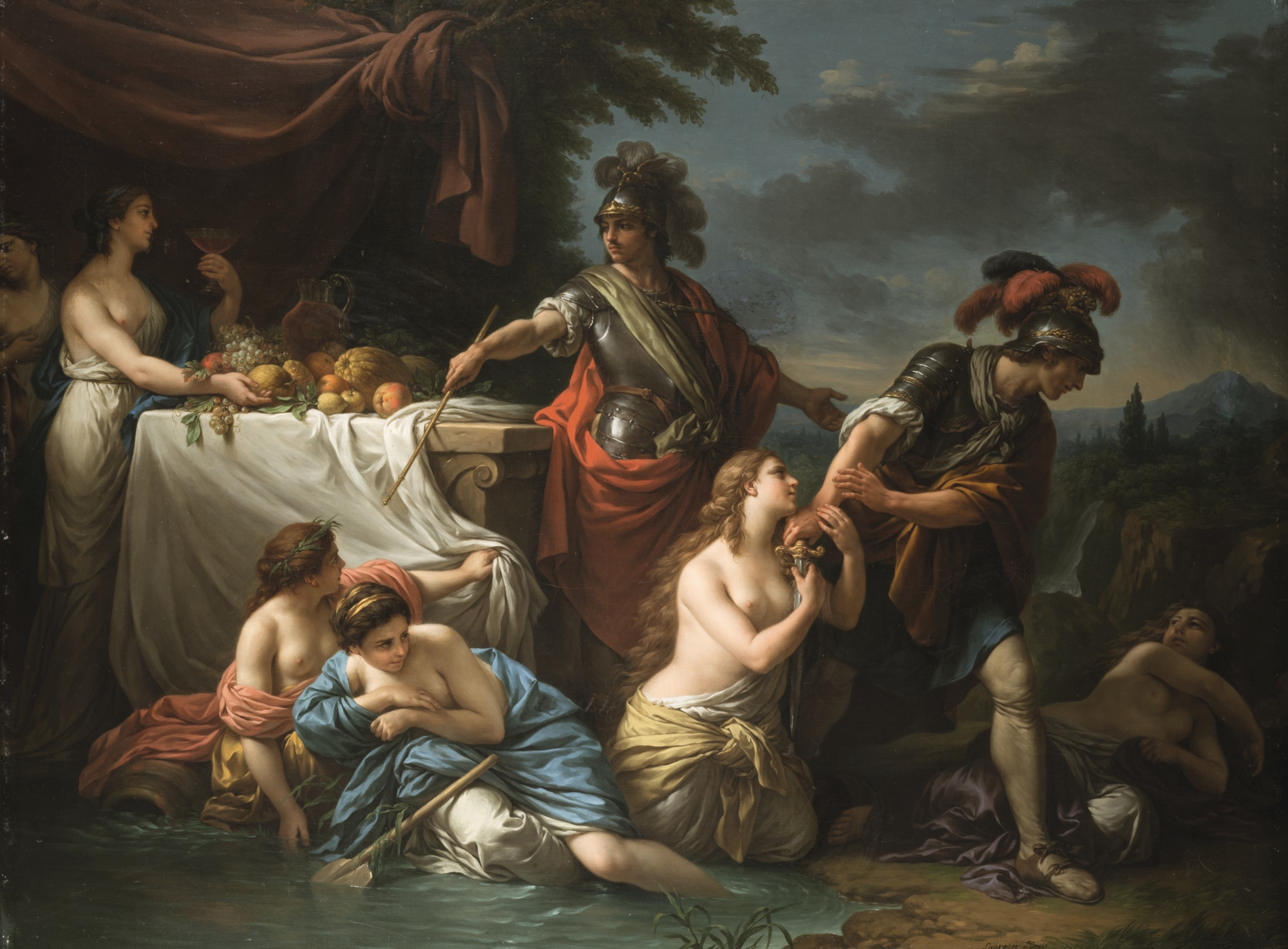
Ubalde et le chevalier Danois by Louis-Jean-François Lagrenée, (Exhibited at Paris, Salon, 1785, no. 3)

== Recordings ==
- Audio conducted by Rossi, with McKnight/Gardino/Picchi/Mollet (Melodram, recorded live in Torino in 1958)
- Armide (Felicity Palmer), Renaud (Anthony Rolfe Johnson), La Haine (Linda Finnie), Hidraot (Raimund Herincx); City of London Sinfonia, Richard Hickox (EMI, recorded live in London in June 1982)
- Video conducted by Ramin, with Caballé/Szirmay/Lindroos/Baquerizo (YouTube, filmed in Madrid on April 16, 1985)
- Armide (Mireille Delunsch), Renaud (Charles Workman), La Haine (Ewa Podleś), Hidraot (Laurent Naouri); Les Musiciens du Louvre, Marc Minkowski (Archiv, recorded live in Paris in November and December 1996)
- Audio conducted by Muti, with Antonacci/Urmana/Cole/Albert (House of Opera, recorded live in Milan on December 7, 1996)
