= Les fêtes de Paphos =

Opera by Jean-Joseph Cassanéa de Mondonville

- Opéra-ballet by Jean-Joseph Cassanéa de Mondonville
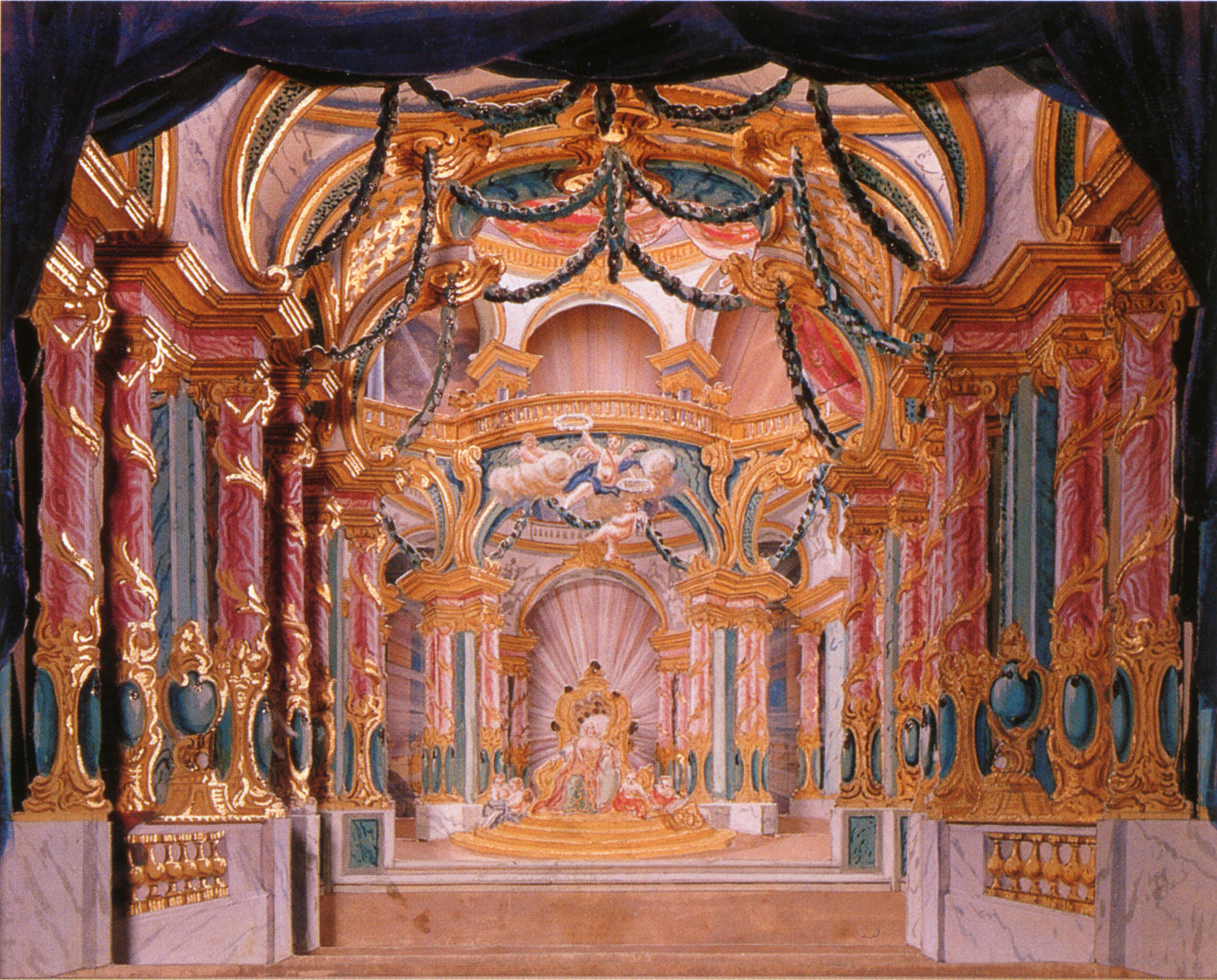
- Palace of Venus, set design for the premiere
- Translation: The Festivals of Paphos
- Librettist: Jean-Baptiste Collet de Messine (Act 1); Charles-Antoine le Clerc de la Bruère (Act 2); Claude-Henri de Fusée de Voisenon (Act 3)
- Language: French
- Based on: Roman mythology
- Premiere: 9 May 1758; Académie royale de musique, Paris

Les fêtes de Paphos (The Festivals of Paphos) is an opéra-ballet in three acts (or entrées) by the French composer Jean-Joseph Cassanéa de Mondonville. The work was described as a ballet héroïque on the title page of the printed score. Each act had a different librettist. Les fêtes de Paphos was first performed at the Académie royale de musique in Paris on 9 May 1758 and was a popular success. Mondonville recycled material from two of his previous operas for the first two acts, namely Erigone (1747) and Vénus et Adonis (1752), both originally composed for Madame de Pompadour's Théâtre des Petits Cabinets.

The title of the work is explained in the preface to the printed score. Paphos was a city in Cyprus sacred to Venus, the goddess of love. "Reunited on the island of Paphos, Venus, Bacchus and Cupid decide to enliven their leisure in such a pleasant location by celebrating their first loves, and this gives rise to the following three acts and the title Les fêtes de Paphos."

== Roles ==
| Role | Voice type | Premiere Cast |
|---|---|---|
| Vénus (Acts 1 and 3) | soprano | Marie-Jeanne Fesch, called Mlle Chevalier |
| Aglaé (Act 1), Amour (Act 2) | soprano | Marie-Jeanne Larrivée Lemière |
| Érigone (Act 2) | soprano | Marie Fel |
| Psyché (Act 3) | soprano | Sophie Arnould |
| Adonis (Act 1) | haute-contre | François Poirier |
| Mercure/Amour (Act 3) | haute-contre | Jean-Pierre Pillot |
| Mars (Act 1), Tisiphone (Act 3) | basse-taille (bass-baritone) | Nicolas Gélin |
| Bacchus (Act 2) | basse-taille | Henri Larrivée |
| Comus (Act 2) | basse-taille | Monsieur Person |

== Synopsis ==
=== Act One: Vénus et Adonis ===
Librettist: Jean-Baptiste Collet de Messine
Source: the myth of Venus and Adonis

The jealous god Mars plots against Adonis, his rival for the love of Venus. In spite of Venus's entreaties, Adonis sets off for a hunt where he is killed. Venus turns him into an anemone. Mars wants to destroy the flower but Jupiter resurrects Adonis. Adonis is happily reunited with Venus.

=== Act Two: Bacchus et Érigone ===
Librettist: Charles-Antoine le Clerc de la Bruère
Source: the myth of Bacchus and Erigone

The nymph Erigone is in love with Bacchus but he thinks only of his own glory. Jupiter encourages their love by holding a celebration in the course of which Bacchus succumbs to Erigone's charms.

=== Act Three: L'Amour et Psyché ===
Librettist: Claude-Henri de Fusée de Voisenon
Source: the myth of Cupid and Psyche

Psyche is in love with Cupid (L'Amour) but is punished by the jealous Venus. Cupid and Psyche are shipwrecked in a storm conjured up by the Fury Tisiphone and Psyche drowns. Cupid journeys to the underworld and rescues Psyche but daylight reveals that her beauty has been destroyed by Tisiphone. Nevertheless, Cupid declares he is still in love with her. Venus is so touched by this declaration of faithfulness that she restores Psyche's beauty and blesses the couple's love.

== Recordings ==
- Les fêtes de Paphos Jean-Paul Fouchécourt, Véronique Gens, Sandrine Piau, Agnès Mellon, Les Talens Lyriques, conducted by Christophe Rousset (Decca, L'Oiseau Lyre, 1997)

== Sources ==
- Le magazine de l'opéra baroque by Jean-Claude Brenac
- Casaglia, Gherardo (2005). "Les fêtes de Paphos, 9 May 1758". L'Almanacco di Gherardo Casaglia (in Italian).
- Booklet notes to the above recording.
