= Iphigénie en Tauride =

1779 opera by Christoph Willibald Gluck

Iphigénie en Tauride (French: [ifiʒeni ɑ̃ toʁid], Iphigenia in Tauris) is a 1779 opera by Christoph Willibald Gluck in four acts. It was his fifth opera for the French stage. The libretto was written by Nicolas-François Guillard.

With Iphigénie, Gluck took his operatic reform to its logical conclusion. The recitatives are shorter and they are récitatif accompagné (i.e. the strings and perhaps other instruments are playing, not just continuo accompaniment). The normal dance movements that one finds in the French tragédie en musique are almost entirely absent. The drama is ultimately based on the play Iphigenia in Tauris by the ancient Greek dramatist Euripides which deals with stories concerning the family of Agamemnon in the aftermath of the Trojan War.

== Performance history ==
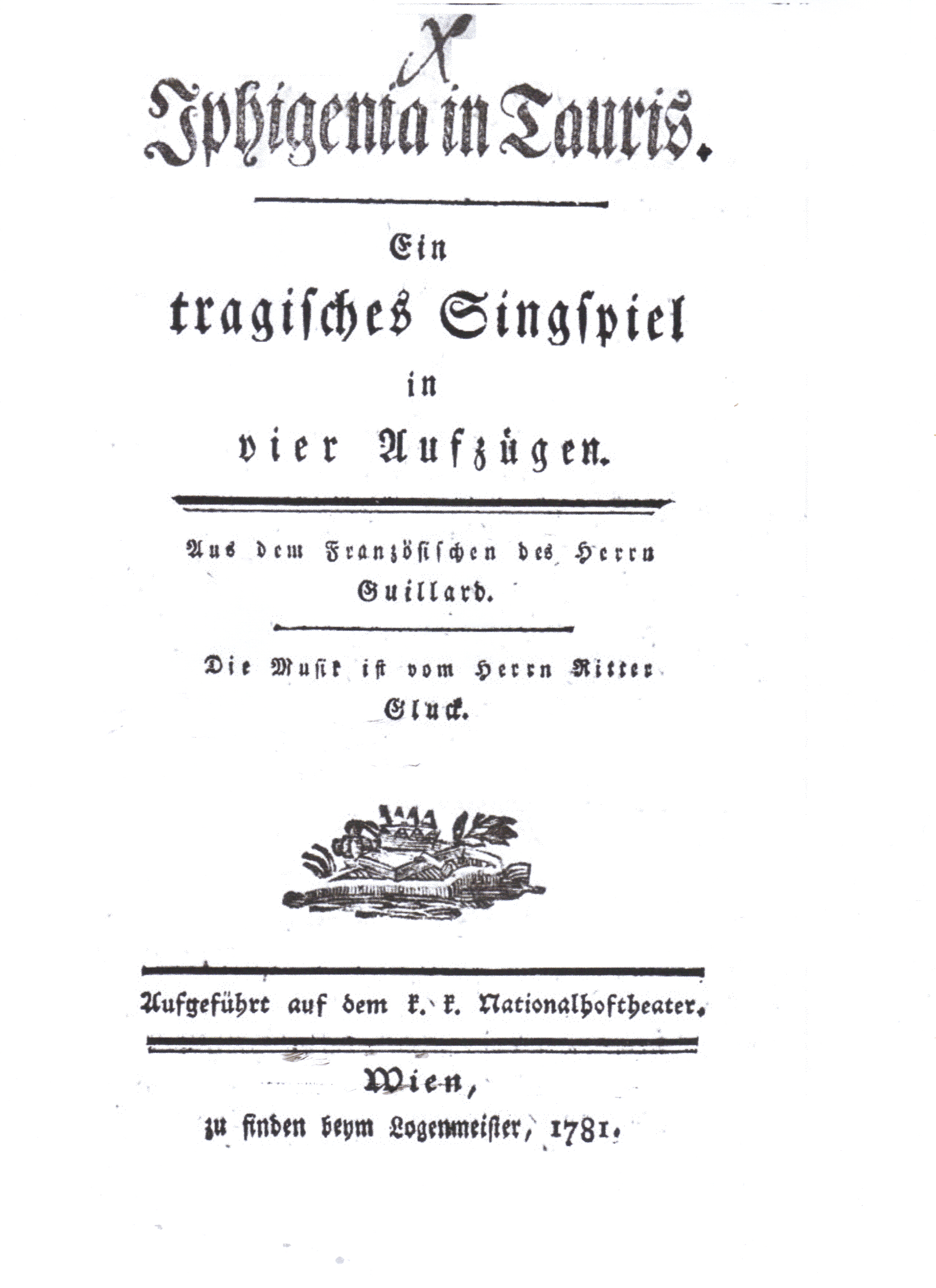
Title page of the German libretto of Iphigénie en Tauride

Iphigénie en Tauride was first performed on 18 May 1779 by the Paris Opéra at the second Salle du Palais-Royal and was a great success. Some think that the head of the Paris Opéra, Devismes, had attempted to stoke up the rivalry between Gluck and Niccolò Piccinni, an Italian composer also resident in the French capital, by asking them both to set an opera on the subject of Iphigenia in Tauris. In the event, Piccinni's Iphigénie en Tauride was not premiered until January 1781 and did not enjoy the popularity of Gluck's work.

In 1781 Gluck produced a German version of the opera, Iphigenia in Tauris, for the visit of the Russian Grand Duke Paul to Vienna, with the libretto translated and adapted by Johann Baptist von Alxinger in collaboration with the composer. Among the major changes was the transposition of the role of Oreste from baritone to tenor and the replacement of the final chorus of Act 2 with an instrumental movement. The revised version was the only opera Gluck wrote in German, and his last work for the stage. Styled "a tragic Singspiel", it was staged on 23 October 1781 at the Nationalhoftheater, as the emperor Joseph II had had the Burgtheater renamed after dismissing the Italian singers and their orchestra in 1776 and installing German actors in the theatre. When the meagre results achieved by the new Singspiel programmes led the emperor to back down, getting an Italian opera buffa company recruited again and engaging Lorenzo Da Ponte as his theatre poet, the latter was charged to prepare an Italian translation of Gluck's opera, which was staged in the restored Burgtheater, on 14 December 1783. According to Irish tenor Michael Kelly's "reminiscences" this production, too, was personally supervised by Gluck. The German edition was revived in Berlin at the former Königliches Nationaltheater in the Gendarmenmarkt on 24 February 1795, while Da Ponte's translation was chosen for the London first performance at the King's Theatre on 7 April 1796. The original French version eventually proved to be one of Gluck's most popular composition in Paris: "it was billed on 35 dates in 1779, and it went on to enjoy more than four hundred representations in 1781–93, 1797–1808, 1812–18, 1821–23, 1826–28, and 1829. It was mounted at the Châtelet (1868), the Renaissance (1899), and the Opéra-Comique (1900). It was brought to the stage of the present opera house in Paris on 27 June 1931 with the aid of the Wagner Society of Amsterdam and with Pierre Monteux conducting the orchestra".

In 1889 Richard Strauss made a new German arrangement of the work for the publisher Adolph Fürstner, which was later staged in Weimar at the Hoftheater on 9 June 1900, under the Goethe-inspired title of Iphigenie auf Tauris. Strauss's version was quite often performed at the beginning of the twentieth century and was also used for the work's première at the Metropolitan Opera in 1916, but is by now rarely heard. It was recorded in 1961 with Montserrat Caballé in the title role, conducted by Antonio de Almeida, in performance at the Teatro Nacional de São Carlos, Lisbon. It was recently revived at the 2009 Festival della Valle d'Itria at Martina Franca.

As for the Da Ponte Italian version, there was a memorable staging at the Teatro alla Scala in 1957, with Nino Sanzogno conducting the orchestra, Luchino Visconti as the director and Maria Callas in the title role.

== Roles ==
Role	Voice type	Premiere cast, 18 May 1779 (Conductor: – )
Iphigénie (Iphigenia), Priestess of Diana	soprano or mezzo-soprano	Rosalie Levasseur
Oreste (Orestes), her brother	baritone or tenor	Henri Larrivée
Pylade (Pylades), his friend	tenor	Joseph Legros
Thoas, King of Scythia	bass	Jean-Pierre (?) Moreau
Diane (Diana)	soprano	Châteauvieux
Scythians, priestesses of Diana, Greeks

== Synopsis ==
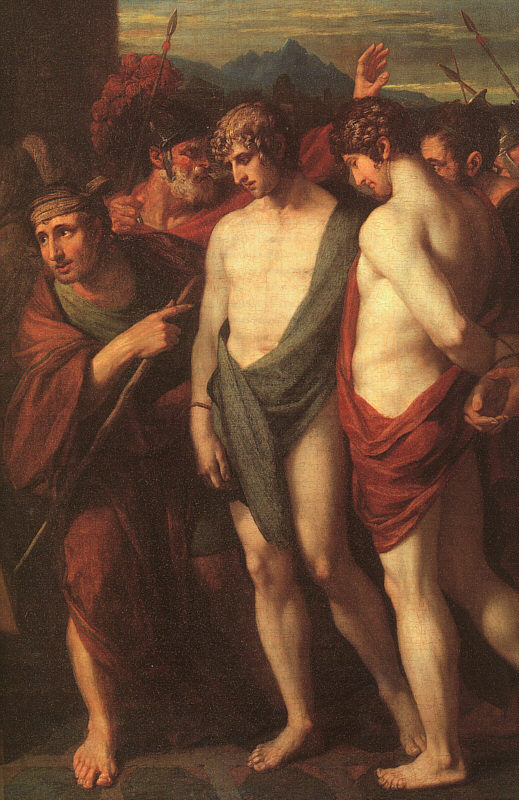
Benjamin West: Pylades and Orestes brought as victims to Iphigenia (1766), detail

=== Act 1 ===
Scene: The entrance hall of the temple of Diana in Tauris.

There is no overture; the opera begins with a short passage evoking calm before turning into a depiction of a great storm at sea. Iphigenia, sister of Orestes, is the high priestess of Diana in the temple of Tauris, having been transported there magically by the goddess when her father Agamemnon attempted to offer her as a sacrifice. Iphigenia and her priestesses beg the gods to protect them from the storm (Grands dieux! soyez nous secourables).

Although the storm dies down, Iphigenia remains troubled by a dream she has had, in which she envisioned her mother Clytaemnestra murdering her father, then her brother Orestes killing her mother, and finally her own hand stabbing her brother. She prays to Diana to reunite her with Orestes (Ô toi qui prolongeas mes jours). Thoas, King of Tauris, enters. He too is obsessed with dark thoughts (De noirs pressentiments): the oracles, he tells her, predict doom for him if a single stranger escapes with his life. (The custom of the Scythians, who inhabit Tauris, is to ritually sacrifice any who are shipwrecked on their shores).

A chorus of Scythians comes bringing news of two young Greeks who have just been found shipwrecked, demanding their blood (Il nous fallait du sang). After Iphigenia and the priestesses depart, Thoas brings in the Greeks, who turn out to be Orestes and his friend Pylades. After asking them for what purpose they came (they have come to retrieve Diana's statue and return it to Greece, though they do not divulge this), Thoas promises them death and has them taken away.

=== Act 2 ===
Scene: An inner chamber of the temple

Orestes and Pylades languish in chains. Orestes berates himself for causing the death of his dear friend (Dieux qui me poursuivez), but Pylades assures him that he does not feel dispirited because they will die united (Unis dès la plus tendre enfance). A minister of the sanctuary comes to remove Pylades. Orestes half falls asleep (Le calme rentre dans mon coeur), but he is tormented by visions of the Furies, who wish to avenge his slaying of his mother (whom Orestes killed for murdering his father Agamemnon).

Iphigenia enters and, although the two do not recognize each other, Orestes sees an astonishing likeness between her and the slain Clytaemnestra seen in his dream. She questions him further, asking him the fate of Agamemnon and all Greece, and he tells her of Agamemnon's murder by his wife, and the wife's murder by her son. In agitation, she asks of the fate of the son, and Orestes says that the son found the death he had long sought, and that only their sister Electra remains alive. Iphigenia sends Orestes away and with her priestesses laments the destruction of her country and the supposed death of her brother (Ô malheureuse Iphigénie). She and the priestesses perform a funeral ceremony for Orestes (Contemplez ces tristes apprêts).

=== Act 3 ===
Scene: Iphigenia's chamber

Iphigenia is drawn to the stranger who reminds her of her brother Orestes (D'une image, hélas! trop chérie). She tells Orestes and Pylades she can persuade Thoas to save one of them from the sacrifice (Je pourrais du tyran tromper la barbarie) and asks the one who is spared to carry word of her fate to her sister Electra in Argos. Both men readily agree, and Iphigenia chooses Orestes to survive.

But on her exit, Orestes insists that Pylades agree to switch places with him as Orestes cannot bear the thought of his friend's death and sees dying as an escape from his own madness; Pylades, on the contrary, is glad at the thought of dying so Orestes can live (Duet: Et tu prétends encore que tu m'aimes and aria for Pylades: Ah! mon ami, j'implore ta pitié!). When Iphigenia returns, Orestes insists that she reverse her decision, threatening to kill himself before her eyes if she does not. Reluctantly, she agrees to spare Pylades instead and sends him to carry her message to Electra. Everyone but Pylades departs, and he closes the act by promising to do everything possible to save Orestes (Divinité des grandes âmes!).

=== Act 4 ===
Scene: Inside the temple of Diana

Iphigenia wonders how she can ever carry out the killing of Orestes, since somehow her soul shrinks from the thought of it. She asks the goddess Diana to help her steel herself for the task (Je t'implore et je tremble). The priestesses bring in Orestes, who has been prepared for sacrifice (Chorus: Ô Diane, sois nous propice). He tells her not to lament him, but to strike, telling her it is the will of the gods. The priestesses sing a hymn to Diana as they lead Orestes to the altar (Chorus: Chaste fille de Latone). While she wields the knife, Orestes exclaims Iphigenia's name, leading her and the priestesses to recognize him and stop the ritual slaughter.

The happy reunion of sister and brother is cut short at news that Thoas is coming, having heard that one of the captives was released and intent on the blood of the other. The king enters wildly, ordering his guards to seize Orestes and promising to sacrifice both him and his sister. At that moment Pylades enters with a band of Greeks, cutting down Thoas where he stands.

The resulting rout of the Scythians by the Greeks is halted by a dea ex machina appearance of Diana, who commands the Scythians to restore her statue to Greece (Arrêtez! Écoutez mes décrets éternels). She also issues pardon to Orestes for murdering his mother, sending him to be king over Mycenae and bidding him restore Iphigenia to her country. As Diana is carried back into the clouds, everyone sings a concluding chorus of rejoicing at having the favor of earth and heaven restored to them (Les dieux, longtemps en courroux).

== Libretto ==
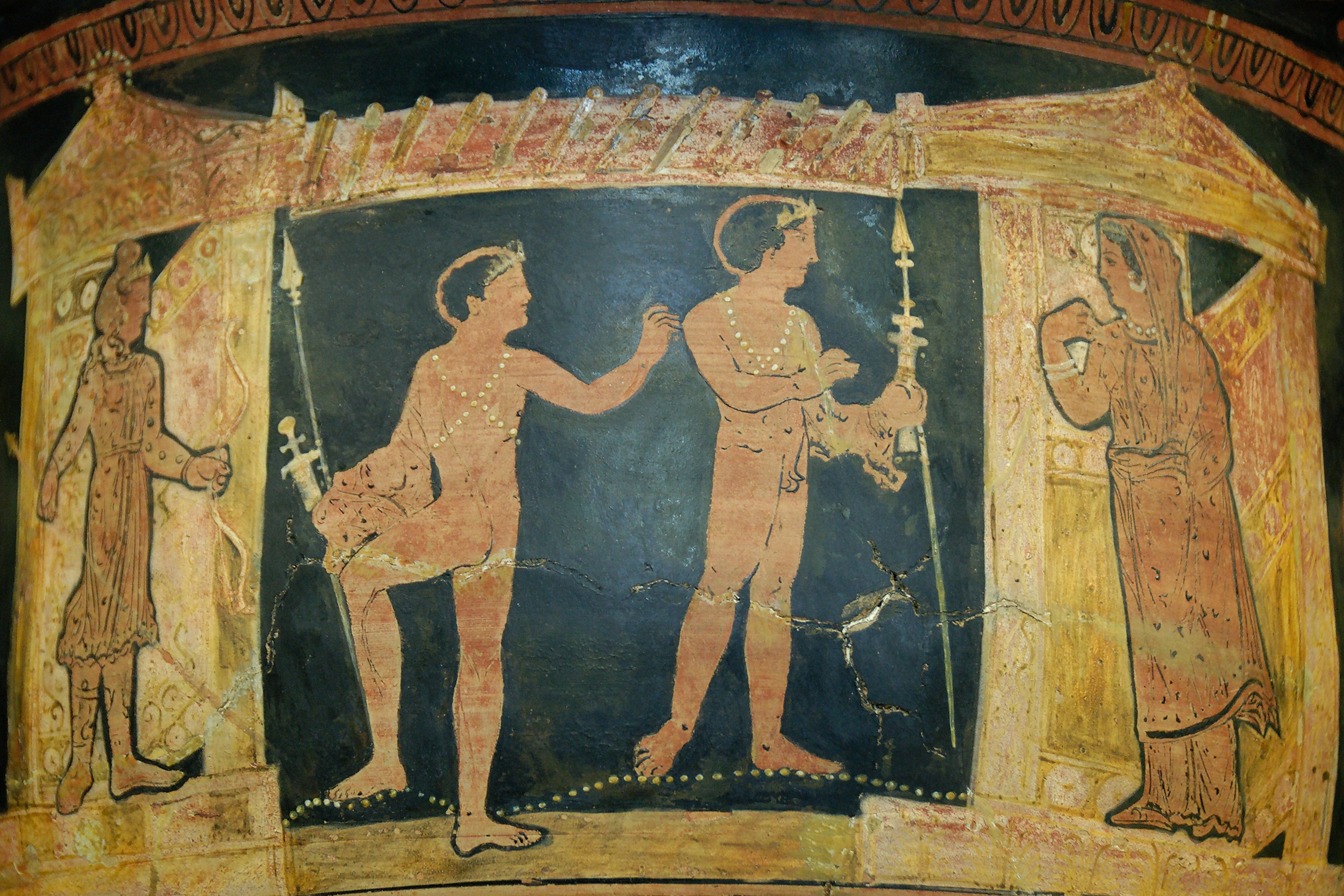
Ancient Greek vase showing Orestes and Pylades meeting Iphigenia in Tauris

The ultimate source of the drama was Euripides' tragedy Iphigenia in Tauris. Because of its simplicity and heroic themes this work had a particular appeal for 18th-century proponents of Neo-classicism and there were several dramatic versions in the late 1700s, the most famous of which is Goethe's Iphigenie auf Tauris (1787). However, the most important as far as Gluck is concerned – because it formed the basis of Guillard's libretto – is Guimond de la Touche's spoken tragedy, which premiered in Paris on 4 June 1757. De la Touche's play was such a success that it was transferred to Vienna in 1761. It contributed to a vogue for the Tauris story in the city. In 1763 a "reform opera" on the subject by Tommaso Traetta with a libretto by Marco Coltellini, Ifigenia in Tauride, appeared on the Viennese stage. Coltellini's and Traetta's ideas on how to reform opera were similar to Gluck's and Gluck himself conducted the work in 1767. Gluck may have wanted to compose his own reform opera on the Tauris theme but Traetta's opera made this impossible for the time being. Instead, in 1765 Gluck composed a ballet, Sémiramis, which has many points in common with it and he reused some of the music from Sémiramis in Iphigénie en Tauride.

It was only after he moved to Paris that Gluck finally had the opportunity to set the Tauris story and then only after he had composed another opera on the Iphigenia theme, Iphigénie en Aulide (1774). Beginning work in 1778, Gluck collaborated closely with the young poet Nicolas-François Guillard, who based his libretto on Guimond de la Touche's play. De la Touche's work had been praised for its simplicity, but Gluck and his librettist simplified the drama even further. Their main innovations were to begin the opera with a storm (which would have been more difficult in a spoken drama) and to delay the recognition until the finale.

Iphigénie en Tauride was an innovative libretto in the history of opera. Michael Ewans has commented, "Gluck's most radical 'reform opera' even dispenses with a love interest. Romantic interest is peripheral to Greek drama, but Iphigénie en Tauride, 'the first opera without love to exist in our theatres' must be one of the few major operas to forego the theme altogether."

== Music ==
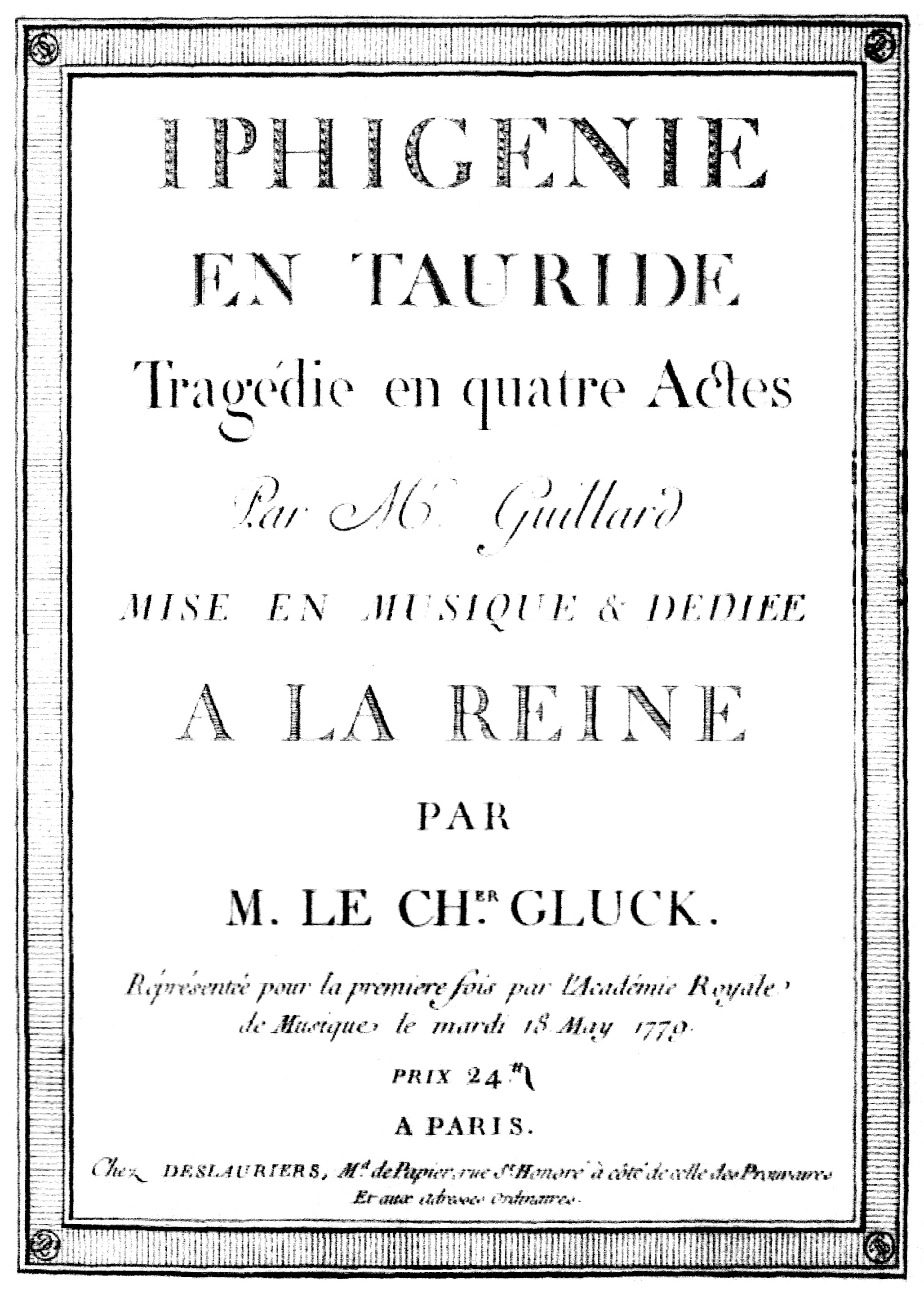
Title-page of the first printed score

=== Gluck's borrowings ===
The borrowings Gluck made in this, his last significant opera, are numerous, and many scholars feel that they constitute a "summing up" of the artistic ideals he pursued throughout his career as a composer. Recycling music was common practice among 18th century composers. Gluck knew that his earlier Italian-language operas and the ballets and opéras comiques he had written for Vienna were never likely to be played again, whereas the French had a tradition of keeping successful operas in the repertory. Recycling was thus a way of saving some of his most outstanding musical ideas. Most of the reused music is Gluck's own, culled from his earlier operas or from his ballet Sémiramis. In at least one case, however, an aria in Iphigénie en Tauride is actually Gluck borrowing from himself borrowing from Johann Sebastian Bach. This is a complete list of Gluck's borrowings:

- Introduction: Overture from L'île de Merlin, featuring a storm followed by a calm. Gluck's major innovation was to reverse the order of the movements so the opera opens with the calm which then turns into a storm (Iphigénie en Tauride has no overture as such).
- Aria Dieux qui me poursuivez from Telemaco (Aria:Non dirmi ch'io)
- Music for the Furies in act 2 from the ballet Sémiramis
- Act 2 aria O malheureuse Iphigénie from La clemenza di Tito (Aria: Se mai senti spirarti sul volto)
- Act 2 chorus: Contemplez ces tristes apprêts from the middle section of the same aria
- Aria Je t'implore et je tremble, inspired (consciously or unconsciously) by the gigue of the Partita no. 1 in B Flat (BWV 825) by Bach, originally appeared as the aria Perchè, se tanti siete in Gluck's Antigono
- Some music in the climactic final scene of act 4 was taken from Sémiramis
- Final chorus (Les dieux, longtemps en courroux) from Paride ed Elena (Chorus: Vieni al mar)

=== Innovative features ===
Unusually for a French opera, Iphigénie contains only one short divertissement (an opportunity for dance and spectacle): the chorus and dance of the Scythians in the "Turkish" style at the end of the first act. This was so out of the ordinary that, after the first five performances, with Gluck's acquiescence, the authorities of the Paris Opéra added ballet music by François-Joseph Gossec to the finale, with Jean-Georges Noverre's choreography. Which was commented upon as follows in the Journal de Paris:

The public’s fondness for the superior talent of the principal dancers has inspired, for the end of this tragedy, a ballet which was a sort of continuation thereof. The defeated Scythians in chains are presented to Orestes, who gives them their freedom. They rejoice with the Greeks. The ballet ends with the removal of the statue of Diana, the sole object of the voyage undertaken by Orestes and Pylades. The music is by Gossec. The tunes seemed well suited to the ways of the two united peoples.

— Journal de Paris, "Spectacles", Opéra (3 June 1779, p. 619)

The opera contains "Gluck's most famous piece of psychological instrumentation", "Le calme rentre dans mon cœur". As Donald Grout describes it: "Orestes, left alone after Pylades has been arrested by the temple guards, falls into a half stupor; in pitiable self-delusion he tries to encourage the feeling of peace that descends on him momentarily, singing Le calme rentre dans mon cœur. But the accompaniment, with a subdued, agitated, sixteenth-note reiteration of one tone, and with a sforzando accent at the first beat of every measure, betrays the troubled state of his mind, from which he cannot banish the pangs of remorse for his past crime. It is perhaps the first occurrence in opera of this device of using the orchestra to reveal the inward truth of a situation, in distinction from, even in contradiction to, the words of the text – a practice that Richard Wagner was later to incorporate into a complete system." When a critic complained about the contradiction between Orestes' words and the musical accompaniment, Gluck replied: "He's lying: he killed his mother."
