= Thésée (Gossec) =

Thésée (Theseus) is an opera by the composer François-Joseph Gossec, first performed at the Académie Royale de Musique on 1 March 1782. It is a setting of a revised version in four acts of a libretto by Philippe Quinault, originally set by Jean-Baptiste Lully in 1675.

== Roles ==
Cast	Voice type	Premiere
Églé, princess raised under the supervision of Égée, King of Athens	soprano	Antoinette Saint-Huberty
Cléone, confidante of Églé	soprano	Gertrude Girardin
Arcas, confidant of Égée	basse-taille (bass-baritone)	Moreau
Grande prêtresse de Minerve (high priestess of Minerva)	soprano	Châteauvieux
Égée (Aegeus), King of Athens	basse-taille (bass-baritone)	Henri Larrivée
Médée (Medea), a princess and enchantress	soprano	Françoise-Claude-Marie-Rosalie Campagne (called Mlle Duplant)
Dorine, confidante of Médée	soprano	Suzanne Joinville
Thésée (Theseus), unknown son of Égée	haute-contre	Joseph Legros
Minerve (the goddess Minerva)	soprano	Châteauvieux
Deux vieillards (two old men)	tenor/basse-taille	Étienne Lainez, Auguste-Athanase (Augustin) Chéron
Une vieille (an old woman)	soprano	Anne-Marie-Jeanne Gavaudan (the elder)
Chorus: Priestesses of Minerva, followers of Égée, warriors, inhabitants of the Underworld, people of Athens, Furies

== Synopsis ==
=== Act 1 ===
Princess Églé is in love with Thésée and prays for his safe return from battle against rebels who are threatening King Égée of Athens. Égée enters victorious. He tells Églé he is in love with her, despite being betrothed to the sorceress Médée. Égée says he now intends to marry Médée to his son, whom he has hidden away at Troezen and has not seen for years. The Athenians celebrate their victory with a sacrifice to the goddess Minerva.

=== Act 2 ===
Médée is in love with Thésée. She agree to let Égée break off their engagement so he can pursue Églé. Égée is jealous of Thésée's popularity with the people of Athens, who want to make him the king's heir because of his bravery in battle. Médée offers to help Thésée, who reveals to her that he is in love with Églé, provoking the sorceress to jealousy.

=== Act 3 ===
Médée threatens Églé that she will use her magic against her if the princess does not renounce her love for Thésée and marry the king instead. She conjures up a vision of a terrifying desert full of monsters and also menaces Églé with demons from hell. Médée also says she will put Thésée's life in danger if Églé does not comply. She conjures a vision of the sleeping Thésée in which she threatens to sacrifice him with a knife. Thésée wakes and is perplexed by Églé's sudden coldness towards him. She explains she is trying to save his life. Thésée reveals that he is Égée's son from Troezen. Médée appears to relent and bless the betrothal of Thésée and Églé.

=== Act 4 ===
In reality, Médée is still tortured by jealousy. She persuades Égée to kill Thésée, warning him that if he makes Thésée his heir the king will wrong his missing son. Égée hands Thésée a poisoned chalice but he recognises Thésée's sword and realises the young man must be his son. Just in time, he prevents Thésée from drinking the poison. He agrees to let Thésée marry Églé. Thwarted, Médée escapes only to reappear on a flying chariot pulled by dragons. She threatens to burn down the palace but the goddess Minerve prevents her and raises a magnificent new palace and the opera ends with rejoicing.

== Recording ==
- Thésée Frédéric Antoun, Jennifer Borghi, Thibaut Lénaerts, Bénédicte Fadeux, Aurélie Franck, Choeur de Chambre de Namur, Les Agrémens, conducted by Guy Van Waas (2 CDs, Ricercar, 2013)

== Sources ==
- Original libretto on BNF Gallica
- Booklet notes to the Van Waas recording by Benoît Dratwicki
