= Polixène =

Opera by Antoine Dauvergne

Polixène (Polyxena) is an opera by the French composer Antoine Dauvergne, first performed at the Académie Royale de Musique (the Paris Opéra) on 11 January 1763. It takes the form of a tragédie lyrique in five acts. The libretto, by Nicolas-René Joliveau, is based on Euripides and tells the story of the Trojan princess Polyxena. The opera was dedicated to Emmanuel-Félicité de Durfort de Duras.

== Roles ==
Cast	Voice type	Premiere
Pyrrhus, son of Achilles	basse-taille (bass-baritone)	Nicolas Gélin
Teléphe (Telephus), Prince of the Mysians	haute-contre	Jean-Pierre Pillot
Hécube (Hecuba), widow of Priam	soprano	Marie-Jeanne Fesch, known as "Chevalier"
Polixène (Polyxena), daughter of Priam and Hecuba	soprano	Sophie Arnould
Junon (the goddess Juno)	soprano	Mlle Rozet
Thétis (Thetis)	soprano	Mlle Rozet
La grande prêtresse de Junon (the high priestess of Juno)		Mlle Rivier
Le grand prêtre d'Achille (the high priest of Achilles)		Joly
Un thessalien (a Thessalian man)		Durand
Une troyenne (a Trojan woman)		Mlle Bernard
Une thessalienne (a Thessalian woman)		Mlle Bernard
La jalousie (Jealousy)	basse-taille	Henri Larrivée
Le désespoir (Despair)		Joly
La fureur (Fury)		Muguet
L'ombre d'Achille (the ghost of Achilles)		Durand

== Synopsis ==
The action takes place in the aftermath of the Trojan War. Pyrrhus (son of Achilles) wants to marry Polyxena, but the goddess Juno and Queen Hecuba of Troy, (Polyxena's mother) oppose him. Juno hates the Trojans and would not wish to see a marriage uniting the son of Achilles with the daughter of Hecuba. Hecuba hates Pyrrhus for slaughtering her family. Pyrrhus' friend Telephus is also a rival for Polyxena’s love and he has Hecuba's blessing. Hecuba urges him to kill Pyrrhus. However, Thetis, Pyrrhus' grandmother, manages to appease Juno. When Telephus refuses to kill Pyrrhus, Hecuba has him killed instead. Finally, Hecuba is won over and consents to the marriage of Polyxena and Pyrrhus.

== Sources ==
- David Charlton Opera in the Age of Rousseau: Music, Confrontation, Realism, Cambridge University Press, 2012.
- Félix Clément and Pierre Larousse Dictionnaire des Opéras, Paris, 1881.
- (in French) Benoït Dratwicki, Antoine Dauvergne (1713—1797): une carrière tourmentée dans la France musicale des Lumières, Editions Mardaga, 2011.
