= Rosalie Levasseur =

French opera singer

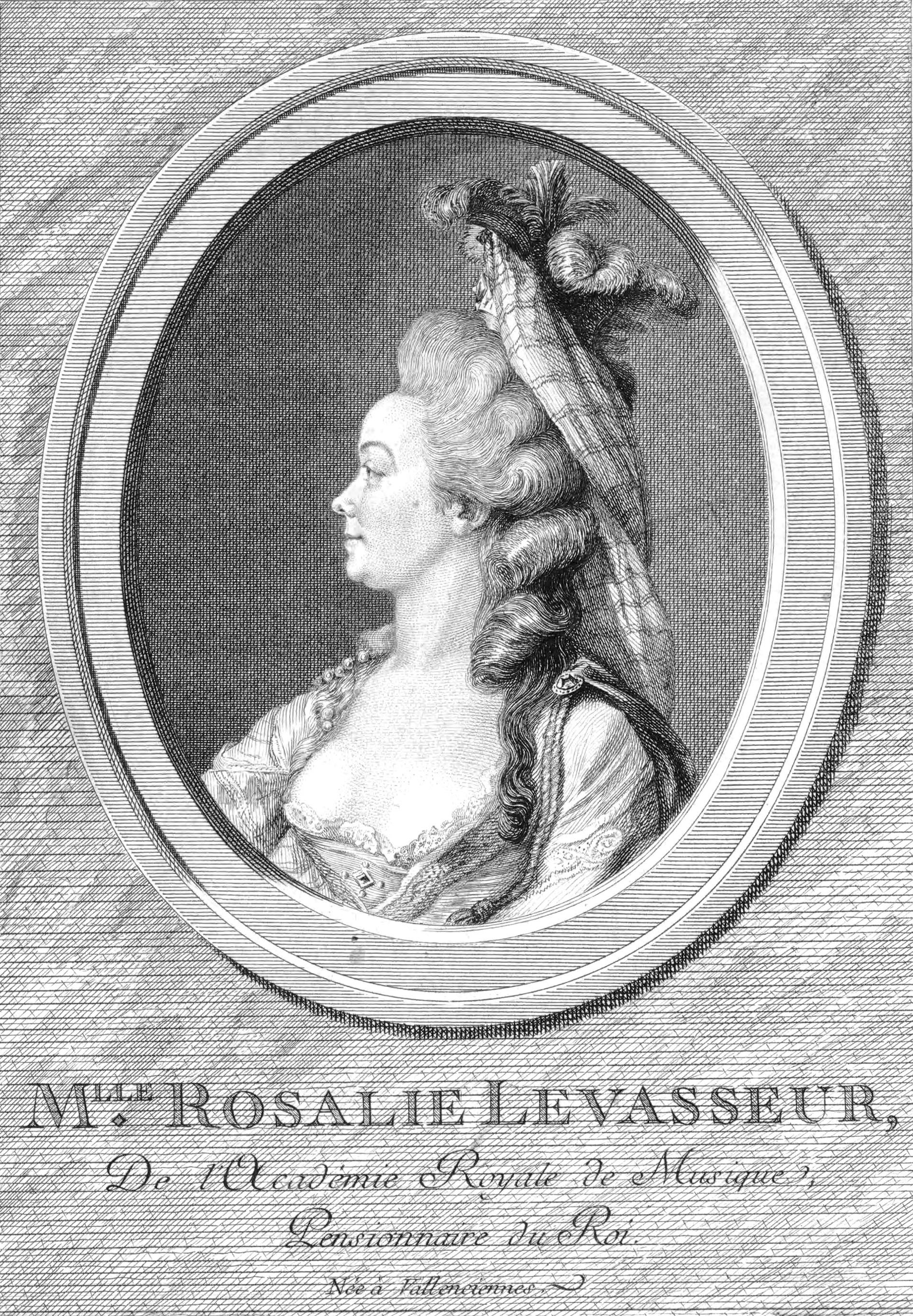
- Born: Marie-Rose-(Claude-)Josephe Levasseur; 8 October 1749; Valenciennes, France
- Died: 6 May 1826 (aged 76); Neuwied am Rhein, Germany
- Other name: Mademoiselle Rosalie
- Occupation: opera singer

Marie-Rose-(Claude-)Josephe Levasseur (or Le Vasseur), known in her day as Mademoiselle Rosalie, and later commonly referred to as Rosalie Levasseur (8 October 1749 – 6 May 1826) was a French soprano who is best remembered for her work with the composer Christoph Willibald Gluck.

== Biography ==
Born in Valenciennes in 1749, she first appeared at the Paris Opéra in a revival of Campra's L'Europe galante in 1766. After an undistinguished beginning to her career, when she appeared only in minor roles, such as Cupid in Berton and Trial's, Théonis (1767), and La Borde's Ismène et Isménias, (1770) her status in the company rapidly improved following Gluck's arrival in Paris in 1774.

The new maestro and the primadonna in office, Sophie Arnould, could not stand each other, while Levasseur was the mistress of the Austrian ambassador and Gluck's countryman Florimond de Mercy-Argenteau, who exerted moreover a strong influence on the Dauphine Marie Antoinette, herself a former singing pupil of the German Kapellmeister. At first 'Mlle Rosalie' was given again an insignificant role (a Greek woman) at the premiere of Iphigénie en Aulide in April, but four months later she performed the much more important part of Cupid in Orphée et Eurydice, being endowed with a second additional aria. The following year she took over from Arnould the leading roles of Iphigénie and Eurydice in the new version of the former opera and in the revivals of the latter, after which she was promoted to the company's top soprano being entrusted with the creation of the title roles in the subsequent main operas by Gluck, Alceste on 23 April 1776, Armide on 23 September 1777, and Iphigénie en Tauride on 18 May 1779. She also appeared in operas by Gluck's rival Niccolò Piccinni, as well as Johann Christian Bach, André Grétry, and Antonio Sacchini.

In 1783 she handed over to Antoinette Saint-Huberty the role of Armide in Sacchini's Renaud after its third performance, and she is not known to have tried to resume her leading position at the Paris Opera thereafter, just making rarer and rarer appearances in revivals. In June 1784, she performed one last time at Court in the gala entertainment in honour of the King of Sweden, Gustav III, and retired officially in 1785.

Julian Rushton describes Levasseur as a "powerful rather than flexible singer, with a good stage presence if unattractive features."

She died in Neuwied am Rhein in 1826.

== Other roles created ==
- 1768: Spinette in La Vénitienne by Dauvergne
- 1770: Flore in La Fête de Flore by Trial
- 1774: Cupid in Azolan by Floquet
- 1775: Procris in Céphale et Procris by Grétry
- 1775: Chloé in La Cythère assiégée by Gluck (completed by Pierre Montan Berton)
- 1775: Baucis in Philémon et Baucis by Gossec
- 1777: the title role in Ernelinde, princesse de Norvège (3rd revision) by Philidor
- 1778: Angélique in Roland by Piccinni
- 1779: Oriane in Amadis de Gaule by J C Bach
- 1780: the title role in Andromaque by Grétry
- 1780: Andromède in Persée by Philidor
- 1782: the title role in Électre by Lemoyne
