= Thésée (Mondonville) =

Opera by Jean-Joseph Cassanéa de Mondonville

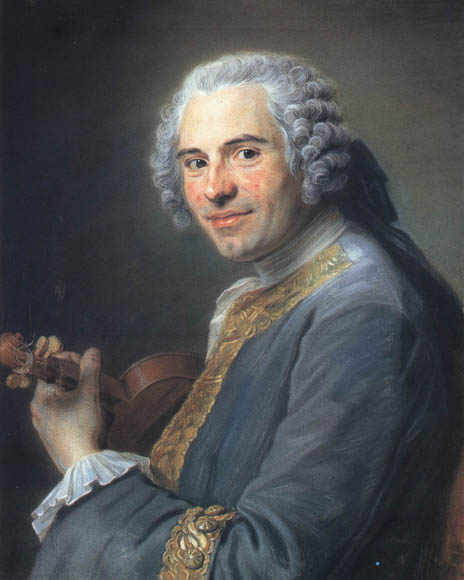
Jean-Joseph de Mondonville, by Maurice Quentin de La Tour, ca. 1746

Thésée (Theseus) is an opera by the French composer Jean-Joseph de Mondonville, first performed at the Palace of Fontainebleau on 7 November 1765. It takes the form of a tragédie en musique in five acts. The opera is a new setting of a libretto by Philippe Quinault, originally set by Jean-Baptiste Lully in 1675. Mondonville's version was not a success and did not get to enjoy its public premiere at the Paris Opera until 13 January 1767, but audience rejected it calling for the restoration of Lully's original music. Mondonville's opera was withdrawn for good after its fourth performance. The music is now lost.

== Roles ==
| Cast | Voice type | Premiere, 7 November 1765 ( Conductor: – ) |
|---|---|---|
| Eglé (Aegle), a princess raised under the tutelage of Egée, King of Athens | soprano | Sophie Arnould |
| Cleone, a confidante of Eglé | soprano | Mlle Avenaux |
| The high priestess of Minerva | soprano | Marie-Jeanne Larrivée Lemière |
| Egée (Aegeus), King of Athens | basse-taille (bass-baritone) | Henri Larrivée |
| Arcas, a confidant of Egée | haute-contre | M Muguet |
| Médée (Medea), a magician princess | soprano | Mlle Dubois (or Du Bois) |
| Dorine, a confidante of Médée | soprano | Mlle Dubrieul |
| Thésée (Theseus), Egée's unknown son | haute-contre | Joseph Legros |
| A woman from Athens | soprano | Marie-Jeanne Larrivée Lemière |
| A shepherd from the enchanted island | haute-contre | M Muguet |
| A shepherdess from the enchanted island | soprano | Marie-Jeanne Larrivée Lemière |
| Minerve | soprano | Mlle Avenaux |
