= Roland (Piccinni) =

1787 opera by Niccolò Piccinni

- Tragédie lyrique by Niccolò Piccinni
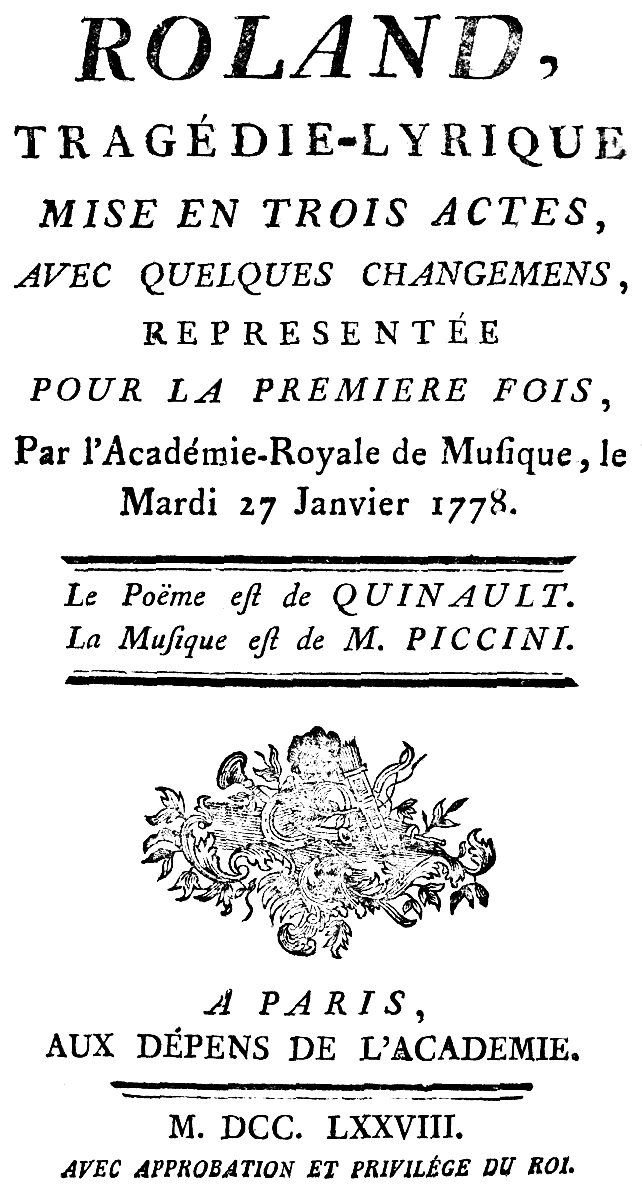
- Title page of the libretto
- Librettist: Jean-François Marmontel
- Language: French
- Based on: Philippe Quinault's Libretto for Lully's Roland
- Premiere: 27 January 1778; Théâtre du Palais-Royal, Paris

Roland is a tragédie lyrique in three acts by the composer Niccolò Piccinni. The opera was a new setting of a libretto written by Philippe Quinault for Jean-Baptiste Lully in 1685, specially adapted for Piccinni by Jean-François Marmontel and based on Ludovico Ariosto's epic poem Orlando Furioso (The Frenzy of Orlando). The opera was first performed on 27 January 1778 by the Académie Royale de Musique (Paris Opera) at the Théâtre du Palais-Royal.

== Background and performance history ==
Roland was the first opera Piccinni wrote for Paris. He had been hired by the Académie royale de musique in 1776, in spite of his ignorance of the French language. Piccinni still knew no French when he was composing Roland and had to be helped all the way by his librettist Marmontel, who provided a translation of every word along with details on how to accentuate it correctly. Marmontel also helped Piccinni come to terms with the French style of opera, which was very different from the Italian. The French preferred short arias, accompanied recitative and plenty of dance movements. In spite of these obstacles, Roland was a great success at its premiere.

Roland forms part of a late 18th-century vogue for resetting libretti Quinault had written for Lully, the first major French opera composer, almost one hundred years before. Another famous example is Gluck's Armide (1776). In fact, Gluck – who was regarded as Piccinni's rival in Paris – was said to have abandoned work on his own setting of Roland when he learnt of Piccinni's version. Piccinni went on to set another Quinault libretto, Atys, in 1779.

== Roles ==
Roles, voice types, premiere cast
Role	Voice type	Premiere cast 27 January 1778
Roland (Orlando)	baritone	Henri Larrivée
Angélique (Angelica)	soprano	Rosalie Levasseur
Médor (Medoro)	haute-contre	Joseph Legros
Témire	soprano	Lebourgeois
Astolfe (Astolfo)	haute-contre	Tirot
Logistille (Logistilla)	soprano	Châteauvieux
Isolano	bass	Nicolas Gélin
Coridon	tenor	Étienne Lainez
Tersandre	baritone	Moreau
Belise	soprano	Anne-Marie-Jeanne Gavaudan

== Synopsis ==
Marmontel's revised libretto adheres closely to Quinault's original. The major changes are the omission of the allegorical prologue and the reduction of Quinault's five acts to three. For an outline of the plot see Roland (Lully).

== Recordings ==
- Roland Soloists, Bratislava Chamber Choir, Orchestra Internazionale d'Italia conducted by David Golub (Dynamic, 2001)
- Médor's demanding Italianate aria, "En butte aux fureurs de l'orage", has been recorded by Rockwell Blake on the CD, Airs d'Opéras Français, Orchestre philarmonique de Monte-Carlo, conducted by Patrick Fournillier (EMI, 1994)
