= Mme Delaval =

French harpist, pianist and composer (1763–c.1804

Mme. Delaval or Madame De La Valle, birthname Adélaïde-Suzanne-Camille Larrivée, (October 12, 1763 – c. 1804) was a French harpist, pianist and composer. Delaval was born in Paris to opera singers Henri Larrivée and Marie-Jeanne Larrivée Lemière. She had one sister, Agathe-Elisabeth-Henriette, who was given violin lessons while Adelaide focused on the harp. Both girls were students of Jean-Baptiste Krumpholz. When their parents separated in 1767, the girls provided for their guardian and aunt, Elisabeth-Henriette Larrivée, by touring through French provinces in concerts.

Adelaide married Pierre Delaval on August 3, 1790, in Lyon. They moved with Agathe to London during the French Revolution. She was employed by Johann Peter Salomon for concerts at Hanover Square in London in 1790 and played for the first Haydn concert in 1792. She was also employed by the Ashleys for concerts in Covent Garden in 1796. Her works have been edited for publication by harpist Jessica Suchy-Pilalis.

== Works ==
Delaval's compositions were mostly for the harp and agreed with the salon culture of c. 1800 Paris. She wrote her Op. 3 for her daughter, Camilla, to perform at Willis's Room in London when the child was only seven years old. Delaval published a cantata, harp music and a number of French songs. Selected works include:

- Les Adieux de l'infortuné Louis XVI à son peuple, cantata
- Prelude, Divertimento and Waltz, Op. 3
- Three sonatas with violin ad lib.
- Grand sonata with violin, tenor (instrument) and cello ad lib.
- Two sets of variations
