= Henriette Larrivée =

French musician (1764–1839)

Agathe Elisabeth Henriette Larrivée
- Born: 6 November 1764
- Died: 26 March 1839 (aged 74)
- Occupations: Violinist, pianist and composer
- Spouse: Antonio Borghese (1745–1806)
- Parents: Henri Larrivée (father); Marie-Jeanne Larrivée Lemière (mother)

Agathe Elisabeth Henriette Larrivée, also L'Arrivée, (6 November 1764 – 26 March 1839) was a French violinist, pianist and composer. She had studied under the composer and harpist Jean-Baptiste Krumpholz. In the late 1780s, she performed in the French provinces with her father, the opera singer Henri Larrivée, her mother, the soprano Marie-Jeanne Larrivée Lemière, and her sister Camille, a harpist. Thereafter (1791 and 1794) she performed as both a pianist and violinist with her sister in London. After marrying the composer Antonio Borghese (1745–1806), Henriette performed with him in France in 1799. She also composed at least two works including a trio sonata for piano, violin and bass.
