= Michel Paul Guy de Chabanon =

French violinist, composer and music theorist (1730–1792)

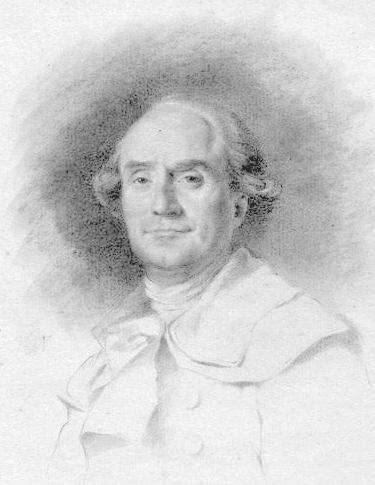
- Born: 1730; Saint-Domingue (now Haiti)
- Died: 10 June 1792 (aged 61–62)
- Occupations: Violinist, composer, writer

Michel-Paul Guy de Chabanon (1730, Saint-Domingue – 10 June 1792, Paris) was a violinist, composer, music theorist, and connoisseur of French literature. He was elected to the Académie des inscriptions et belles-lettres (1760) and the Académie française (1779).

== Biography ==
=== As fiction writer ===
Michel Paul Guy de Chabanon wrote poetry, elegies (notably that of Rameau), plays (including the tragedy of Éponine) and translations (adjudged by the 19th century Dictionnaire Bouillet as having "little fidelity [to the original text], but not lacking in elegance and facility").

=== As musician and music theorist ===
Michel Paul Guy de Chabanon was also a successful musician, playing the violin in the Concert des Amateurs under the direction of Joseph Bologne, chevalier de Saint-Georges.

He was the author of an opera, Sémélé, tragédie lyrique, and of several works on music theory, of which the most valued are his commentaries on music in the work of Aristotle . His double identity as a writer and a musician gave him a unique viewpoint on the links between music and language and in developing a philosophy of music of which his work was the expression. He also contributed to defining opera as a musical genre.

== Works ==
=== Translations ===
- Pindare (1771)
- Théocrite (1775)
- Horace (1773).

=== Works on music esthetics ===
- 1779 : Observations sur la musique, et principalement sur la métaphysique de l'art (Paris, 1779; translated by Weber in German as Ueber die Musik und deren Wirkungen, aus dem franz. übersetzt mit Anmerkungen, Leipzig, 1781)
- 1785 : Sur l'introduction des accords dans la musique des anciens, Mémoire
- 1785 : De la musique considérée en elle-même et dans ses rapports avec la parole, les langues, la poésie, et le théâtre (Paris, )1785).

=== Libretti ===
- Sabinus (1773)
