= Jean-Baptiste Cardonne =

French composer, singer and harpsichordist

Jean-Baptiste Cardonne (26 June 1730 – after August 1792) was a French composer, singer and harpsichordist. Cardonne was born at Versailles, where his father was a member of the royal household. He became a royal page, but his musical talents were soon noticed and he received tuition from the composer Colin de Blamont. In 1745 he joined the choir of the royal chapel, where he also played the harpsichord. His first operatic piece, Amaryllis, premiered in 1752. Cardonne continued to enjoy the patronage of the royal family, writing harpsichord and vocal music for them. From 1768, he tried to establish a career as an opera composer. His lack of success led to his return to the court, where he became maître de la musique du roi (master of the King's music) in 1780. Nothing is known about Cardonne's life after the fall of King Louis XVI during the French Revolution in September 1792.

== Operas ==
Title	Genre	Number of acts	Libretto	Première date	Theatre
Amaryllis	pastorale	3	?	17 July 1752	Théâtre de Compiègne, Compiègne
Omphale	tragédie en musique	5	Antoine Houdar de La Motte	2 May 1769	Salle des Machines, Paris
Ovide et Julie	acte de ballet	1	Louis Fuzelier	16 July 1773	Théâtre du Palais-Royal, Paris
Epaphus et Memphis	opéra	4	Pierre Laujon	?	?

== Sources ==
- Article on Cardonne on the site CESAR (accessed 3 November 2013)
