= Émile Campardon =

French historian, archivist and writer

Émile Campardon (18 July 1837 – 23 February 1915) was a French historian, archivist and writer. He was an archivist and head of the judicial section of the Archives nationales de France from 1857 to 1908, and the author of numerous books. At the beginning of the 20th century he published Quatrains and Souvenirs d’un archiviste. Intended for a circle of friends these extremely rare volumes contain amusing and impertinent portraits of archivists of the 19th century.

He is known above all for his four fundamental works on the history of the theatres of Paris:

- Les Spectacles de la foire, Paris, Berger-Levrault et Cie, 1877, 2 vols.
- Les Comédiens de la troupe française, Paris, H. Champion, 1879.
- Les Comédiens du roi de la troupe italienne, Paris, Berger-Levrault et Cie, 1880, 2 vols.
- L'Académie royale de musique au XVIIIe siècle, Paris, Berger-Levrault et Cie, 1884, 2 vols.

== Biography ==
Born in Paris in 1837, Louis Émile Campardon was the son of Jean François Amand Campardon (1804–1882), a physician, and Aglaé Françoise Aimée Gallais (1809–1874).He became a student at the École nationale des chartes, where in 1857 he defended a thesis entitled Essay on the clerks, notaries, and secretaries of the king from their establishment until 1483, preceded by a note on the referendarii, Cancellarii, and Notarii under the first two races, and under the third until Philip IV, which enabled him to obtain a degree in École Nationale des Chartes.

A curator at the Archives Nationales (France), where he headed the judicial section from 1857 to 1908, he published a monograph on the Revolutionary Tribunal of Paris in the 1860s and, at the beginning of the 20th century, Quatrains et Souvenirs d'un archiviste (Quatrains and Memories of an Archivist). Intended for a circle of friends, these rare little books contain portraits of 19th-century archivists.

On February 9, 1885, he married Pauline Célina Houillon (1825-1906), widow of a wine merchant in Paris, in Argenteuil-sur-Armançon, Yonne.

He died on February 23, 1915, at his home located at 57 Boulevard Beaumarchais, in the 3rd arrondissement of the capital.He is the brother of Charles Campardon, a hydrologist, and the brother-in-law by marriage of Marie Jeanne Émilie Delafontaine, who comes from the family of Bronze founders of the same name.
