= Omphale (Cardonne) =

Opera by Jean-Baptiste Cardonne

Omphale is an opera by the French composer Jean-Baptiste Cardonne, first performed at the Académie Royale de Musique (the Paris Opera) on 2 May 1769. It takes the form of a tragédie en musique in five acts. The libretto, by Antoine Houdar de La Motte, was originally set by André Cardinal Destouches in 1701.

== Sources ==
- (in French) Félix Clément and Pierre Larousse Dictionnaire des Opéras, Paris, 1881
