= Ernelinde, princesse de Norvège =

Tragédie lyrique by François-André Danican Philidor

- Tragédie lyrique by François-André Danican Philidor
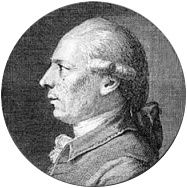
- Portrait of Philidor, London, 1777
- Librettist: Antoine-Alexandre-Henri Poinsinet
- Language: French
- Based on: Francesco Silvani's libretto for La fede tradita, e vendicata
- Premiere: 24 November 1767; Salle des Machines, Paris

Ernelinde, princesse de Norvège (Ernelinde, Princess of Norway) is a three-act operatic tragédie lyrique, by the French composer François-André Danican Philidor. The libretto was by Antoine-Alexandre-Henri Poinsinet, after Francesco Silvani's opera libretto La fede tradita, e vendicata.

== Performance history ==
The work was first performed on 24 November 1767 by the Paris Opera at the Salle des Machines in the Palais des Tuileries in Paris. The first version was given about eighteen times, with the final performance on 10 January 1768. Revised as Sandomir, prince de Dannemarck, it was given in the same theatre on 24 January 1769. This version was also performed in Brussels in 1772. The libretto was further revised in five acts by Michel-Jean Sedaine, this time as Ernelinde with fully orchestrated recitatives by Philidor, and given at the Théâtre Gabriel at the Palace of Versailles on 11 December 1773 and in Brussels in 1774. Philidor and Sedaine revised the five-act version for another set of performances given by the Paris Opera at the second Salle du Palais-Royal beginning on 8 July 1777. It was last revived in June 1778.

The 1777 performances, with their exotic Viking setting, excited enough interest to provoke parodies. One by Jean-Étienne Despréaux, entitled Berlingue, was performed at the Théâtre Royal de la Cour at the Château de Choisy on 13 September, another anonymous work called Sans dormir was given by the Comédie Italienne at the Hôtel de Bourgogne on 12 October.

== Roles ==
| Role | Voice type | Premiere cast, 24 November 1767 | 1st revision, 24 January 1769 | 2nd revision, 11 December 1773 | 3rd revision, 8 July 1777 |
|---|---|---|---|---|---|
| Ricimer, King of the Goths | baritone | Henri Larrivée | Larrivée | Larrivée | Larrivée |
| Sandomir, Prince of Denmark | tenor | Joseph Legros | Legros | Legros | Legros |
| Ernelinde, Princess of Norway | soprano | Marie Jeanne Larrivée | Marie Jeanne Larrivée | Marie Jeanne Larrivée | Rosalie Levasseur |
| Rodoald, King of Norway | bass | Nicolas Gélin | Gélin | Gélin | Gélin |

== Synopsis ==
A Viking-era saga about the struggle for control of Norway, Sweden and Denmark – and for the hand of the Norwegian princess Ernelinde.

== Recording ==
A recording of the second version of 1769 was issued by Chateau de Versailles Spectacles, conducted by Martin Wåhlberg with Judith van Wanroij (Ernelinde), Thomas Dolié (Rodoald), Reinoud Van Mechelen (Sandomir), and Matthieu Lécroart (Ricimer), with the Orkester Nord, Les Chantres du Centre de Musique Baroque de Versailles, and Vox Nidrosiensis.
