= Guy Van Waas =

Belgian conductor, clarinetist, and organist (b. 1948)

Guy Van Waas (Brussels, 15 April 1948) is a Belgian conductor, clarinetist and organist.

He was clarinetist of the Orchestre des Champs-Élysées, Akademie für Alte Musik Berlin and the Orchestra of the Eighteenth Century. Since 2001 he is director of Les Agrémens, a baroque orchestra sponsored by the Communauté française de Belgique and conductor of the Choeur de Chambre de Namur. He was also professor of chamber music at the Conservatoire of Mons.

== Discography ==
- Joseph Haydn : Symphony Nr. 82 & 86 & Ludwig August Lebrun Hoboconcert, (Ricercar, 2010)
- André Ernest-Modeste Grétry Céphale et Procris ou l'Amour conjugal Ballet-héroique 1773. Ricercar RIC 302 2CDs, 2010.
- Rodolphe Kreutzer La mort d'Abel Ediciones Speciales, 2012
- Antoine Dauvergne: La Vénitienne Opéra-ballet (Ricercar, 2012)
- François-Joseph Gossec: Thésée, Tragédie-lyrique (Ricercar, 2013)
- André Modeste Grétry: La caravane du Caire, Comédie-lyrique (Ricercar, 2013)
- Jean Philippe Rameau: Le Temple de la Gloire Ballet-héroïque (Ricercar, 2014)
- Carl Maria von Weber: Klarinettenkonzerte Nr.1 & 2, Orchestra of the Eighteenth Century, with Eric Hoeprich, clarinet (Glossa, 2019)
