= Iphigénie en Aulide =

Opera by Christoph Willibald Gluck

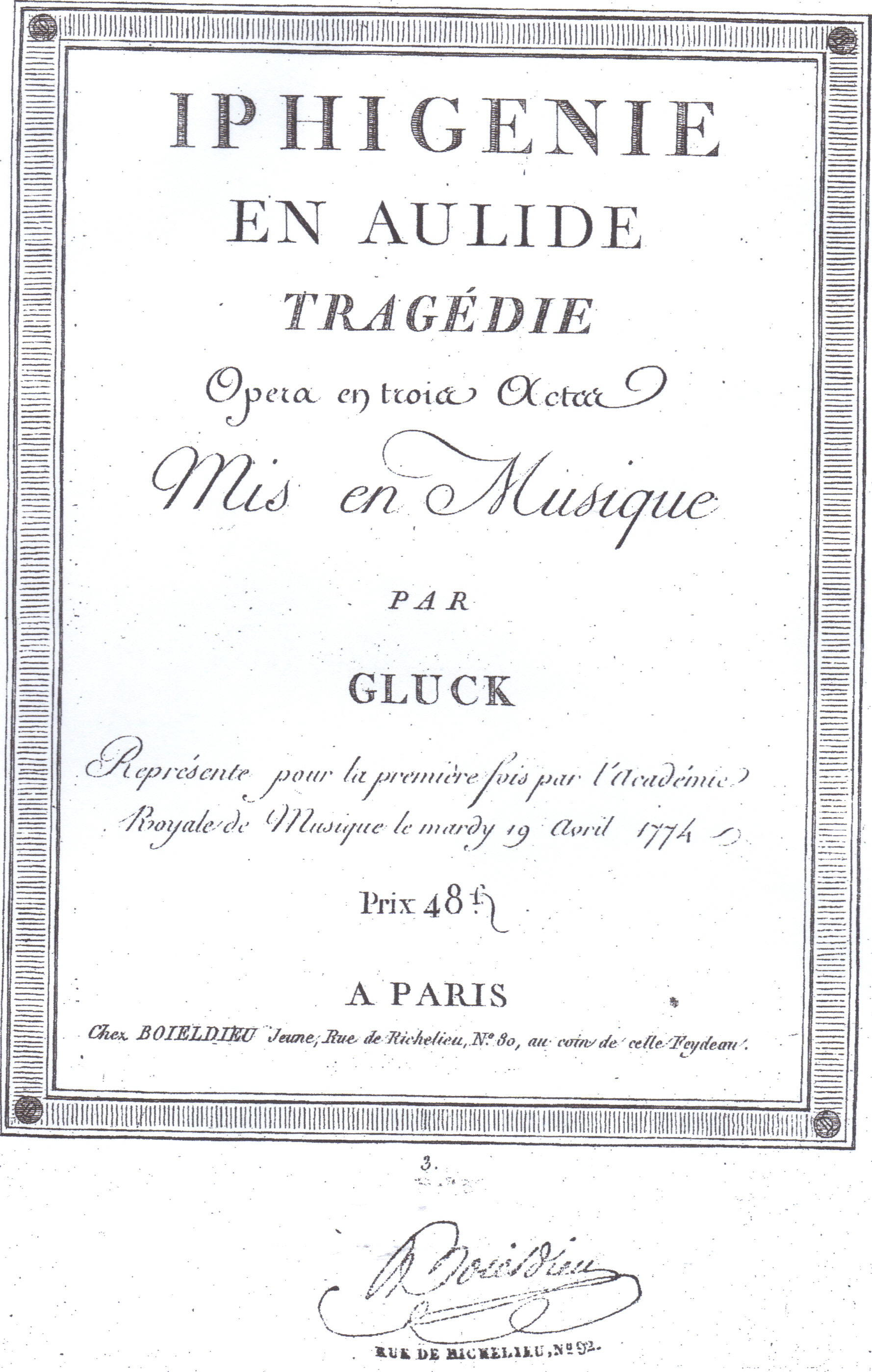
Frontespizio Ifigenia in Aulide

Iphigénie en Aulide (Iphigeneia in Aulis) is an opera in three acts by Christoph Willibald Gluck, the first work he wrote for the Paris stage. The libretto was written by François-Louis Gand Le Bland Du Roullet and was based on Jean Racine's tragedy Iphigénie, itself based on the play Iphigenia in Aulis by Euripides. It was premiered on 19 April 1774 by the Paris Opéra in the second Salle du Palais-Royal and revived in a slightly revised version the following year.

A German version was made in 1847 by Richard Wagner, with significant alterations.

== Performance history ==
At first, Iphigénie was not popular, except for its overture which was applauded generously. After the premiere, it was billed for three days in April 1774, but its first run was interrupted by the theatre's six-week closure due to the dying of Louis XV. Iphigénie en Aulide returned to the theatre on 10 January 1775, and was revived annually from 1776 to 1824 with a few exceptions. During that 50-year span from 1774 to 1824, it was performed in Paris more than 400 times, and eventually turned out to be Gluck's most frequently performed opera in Paris.

For the 1775 revival, "Gluck revised Iphigénie en Aulide ... introducing the goddess Diana (soprano) at the end of the opera as a dea ex machina, and altering and expanding the divertissements ... So, broadly speaking, there are two versions of the opera; but the differences are by no means so great or important as those between Orfeo ed Euridice and Orphée et Euridice or between the Italian and the French Alceste".

In 1847 Richard Wagner presented a revised German version of Gluck's opera, Iphigenia in Aulis, at the court of Dresden. Wagner edited, re-scored and revised the opera significantly including a different ending and some other passages of his own composition. Wagner's version of the opera is available on Eichhorn's 1972 LP recording starring Anna Moffo and Dietrich Fischer-Dieskau, and was also revived at the 1984 Waterloo Festival with Alessandra Marc as Iphigenia. Wagner's finale translated back into French was also performed in the 2002/2003 La Scala production conducted by Riccardo Muti.

Iphigénie en Aulide was first performed in the United States on 22 February 1935 at the Academy of Music, Philadelphia. The fully staged production was presented by the Philadelphia Orchestra and conductor Alexander Smallens. Directed by Herbert Graf, it used sets by Norman Bel Geddes and starred Georges Baklanoff as Agamemnon, Cyrena van Gordon as Clytemnestre, Rosa Tentoni as Iphigénie, Joseph Bentonelli as Achille, and Leonard Treash as Patrocle.

== Roles ==
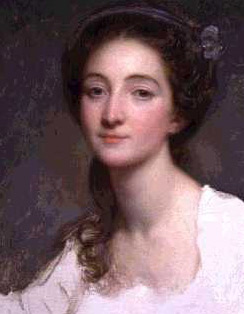
Portrait by Jean-Baptiste Greuze, presumed to be of Sophie Arnould. (Wallace Collection)

Role	Voice type	Premiere Cast, 19 April 1774 Conductor: Louis-Joseph Francœur) (Choreograph: Gaétan Vestris)
Agamemnon, King of Mycenae	baritone	Henri Larrivée
Clitemnestre (Clytemnestra), his wife	soprano	Françoise-Claude-Marie-Rosalie Campagne (called Mlle Duplant)
Iphigénie (Iphigenia), their daughter	soprano	Sophie Arnould
Achille (Achilles), a Greek hero	haute-contre	Joseph Legros
Patrocle (Patroclus)	bass	Durand
Calchas, the High Priest	bass	Nicolas Gélin
Arcas	bass	Beauvalet
Three Greek women	sopranos	Marie-Françoise de Beaumont d'Avantois; Rosalie Levasseur (other performer unknown)
A Lesbian slave woman	soprano	Mlle Chateauneuf
Greek soldiers and people; Thessalian warriors; women from Argos; women from Aulis; men, women and slaves from Lesbos; priestesses of Diana: choir
Ballet ballerinas: Marie-Madeleine Guimard, Marie Allard, Anna Heinel, Peslin; male dancers: Gaétan Vestris, Maximilien Gardel

== Synopsis ==
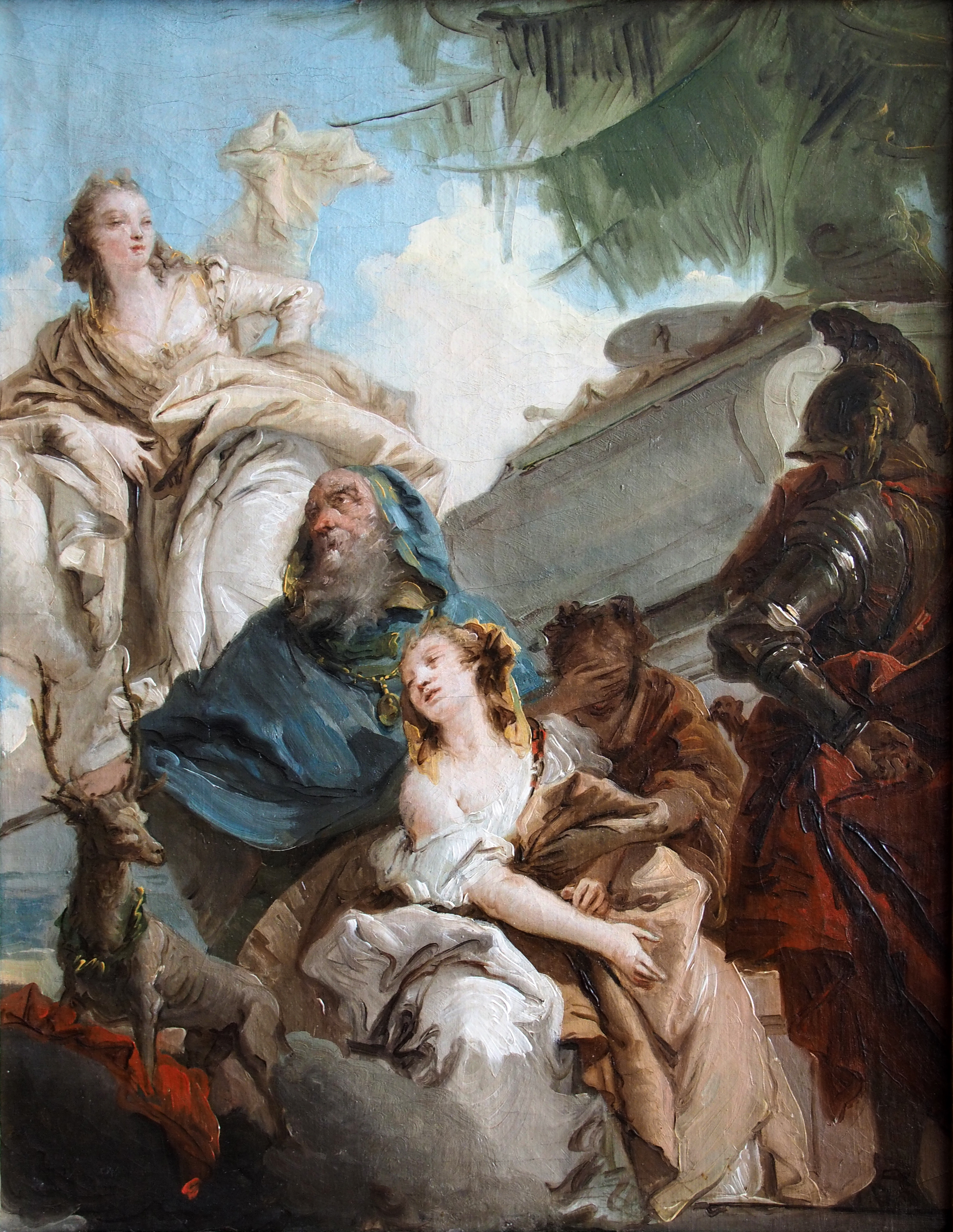
The Sacrifice of Iphigeneia by Tiepolo (Schloss Weimar)

Calchas, the great seer, prophesies that King Agamemnon must sacrifice his own daughter, Iphigenia, in order to guarantee fair winds for the king's fleet en route to Troy –- a demand that comes from the goddess Diana herself. Throughout the opera, Agamemnon struggles with the terrible choice between sparing his daughter's life and ensuring his subjects' welfare.

Agamemnon summons his daughter to Aulis, the port where the Greek navy is gathering, ostensibly for her to marry Achilles, the great warrior hero. Then, reconsidering his decision to sacrifice her, the king tries to prevent her arriving with the fabricated explanation that Achilles has been unfaithful. Iphigenia, however, has already reached the Greek camp accompanied by her mother Clytemnestra. The two women are dismayed and angered by Achilles' apparent inconstancy, but he eventually enters declaring his enduring love for the girl, and the first act ends with a tender scene of reconciliation.

The wedding ceremony is due to be celebrated and festivities take place with dances and choruses. When the couple are about to proceed to the temple, however, Arcas, the captain of Agamemnon's guards, reveals that the king is awaiting his daughter before the altar in order to kill her. Achilles and Clytemnestra rush to save the girl from being sacrificed. Agamemnon finally seems to give up his plan to kill her.

The third act opens with a chorus of Greeks: they object to the king's decision in case they are never allowed to reach Troy, and demand the ceremony be celebrated. At this point, Iphigenia resigns herself to her fate, and offers her own life for the sake of her people, while Clytemnestra entreats the vengeance of Jupiter upon the ruthless Greeks. As the sacrifice is going to be held, however, Achilles bursts in with his warriors and the opera concludes with Gluck's most significant revision of the original myth: Calchas' voice rises over the general turmoil and announces that Diana has changed her mind about the sacrifice and consents to the marriage. In the second 1775 version Diana appears personally to consecrate both the wedding and Agamemnon's voyage.

== Recordings ==
Ballet-Suite. Balletstücke aus Opern von Chr. W. Gluck, No. 1 (with Air gai and Lento from Iphigénie en Aulide; 4:20)
Arranged by Felix Mottl (1856–1911), conducted by Leo Blech (1871–1958), performed in 1927 by Berliner Staatskapelle

- Dietrich Fischer-Dieskau (Agamemnon), Johanna Blatter (Klytämnestra), Martha Musial (Iphigenie), Helmut Krebs (Achilles), Josef Greindl (Kalchas), Maria Reith (Artemis), Leopold Clam (Arkas); RIAS Kammerchor and RIAS Sinfonieorchester, Artur Rother (Gala 100.712). Sung in German, December 1, 1951.
- Dietrich Fischer-Dieskau (Agamemnon), Trudeliese Schmidt (Klytämnestra), Anna Moffo (Iphigenie), Ludovic Spiess (Achilles), Thomas Stewart (Kalchas), Arleen Auger (Artemis), Bernd Weikl (Arkas); Chor des Bayerischen Rundfunks, Müncher Rundfunkorchester, Kurt Eichhorn (Eurodisc/BMG, 1972). Sung in German, this recording presents the score as revised by Richard Wagner.
- José van Dam (Agamemnon), Anne Sofie von Otter (Clytemnestre), Lynne Dawson (Iphigénie), John Aler (Achille), Gilles Cachemaille (Calchas); Monteverdi Choir, Lyon Opera Orchestra, John Eliot Gardiner (Erato, 1990). This recording, sung in French, presents the score as revised by Gluck in 1775.
- Walter Berry (Agamemnon), Inge Borkh (Klytämnestra), Christa Ludwig (Iphigenie), James King (Achilles), Otto Edelmann (Kalchas), Elisabeth Steiner (Artemis), Alois Pernerstorfer (Arkas); Wiener Philharmoniker, Karl Böhm (Orfeo, 1996). Sung in German, using Gluck's last version from 1775.
- Nicolas Testé (Agamemnon), Anne Sofie von Otter (Clytemnestre), Veronique Gens (Iphigénie), Frédéric Antoun (Achille), Christian Helmer (Calchas), Salomé Haller (Diane), Laurent Alvaro (Arcas); Les Musiciens du Louvre, Marc Minkowski (DVD and Blu-ray discs; Opus Arte, 2011). Sung in French.
- Oliver Zwarg (Agamemnon), Michelle Breedt (Klytämnestra), Camilla Nylund (Iphigenia), Christian Elsner (Achilles), Raimund Nolte (Kalchas), Mirjam Engel (Artemis); Chorus Musicus Köln and Das Neue Orchester, Christoph Spering (Oehms Classics, 2013). This recording again follows Wagner's rearrangement of the opera set to his own translation and first performed in Dresden in 1847.
- Tassis Christoyannis (Agamemnon), Stéphanie d'Oustrac (Clytemnestre), Judith van Wanroij (Iphigénie), Cyrille Dubois (Achille), Jean-Sébastien Bou (Calchas); Les Chantres du Centre de Musique Baroque de Versailles, Le Concert de la Loge Julien Chauvin (Alpha Classics, 2024). This recording uses the 1774 score.
