= Jean-Claude Trial =

French composer (1732–1771)

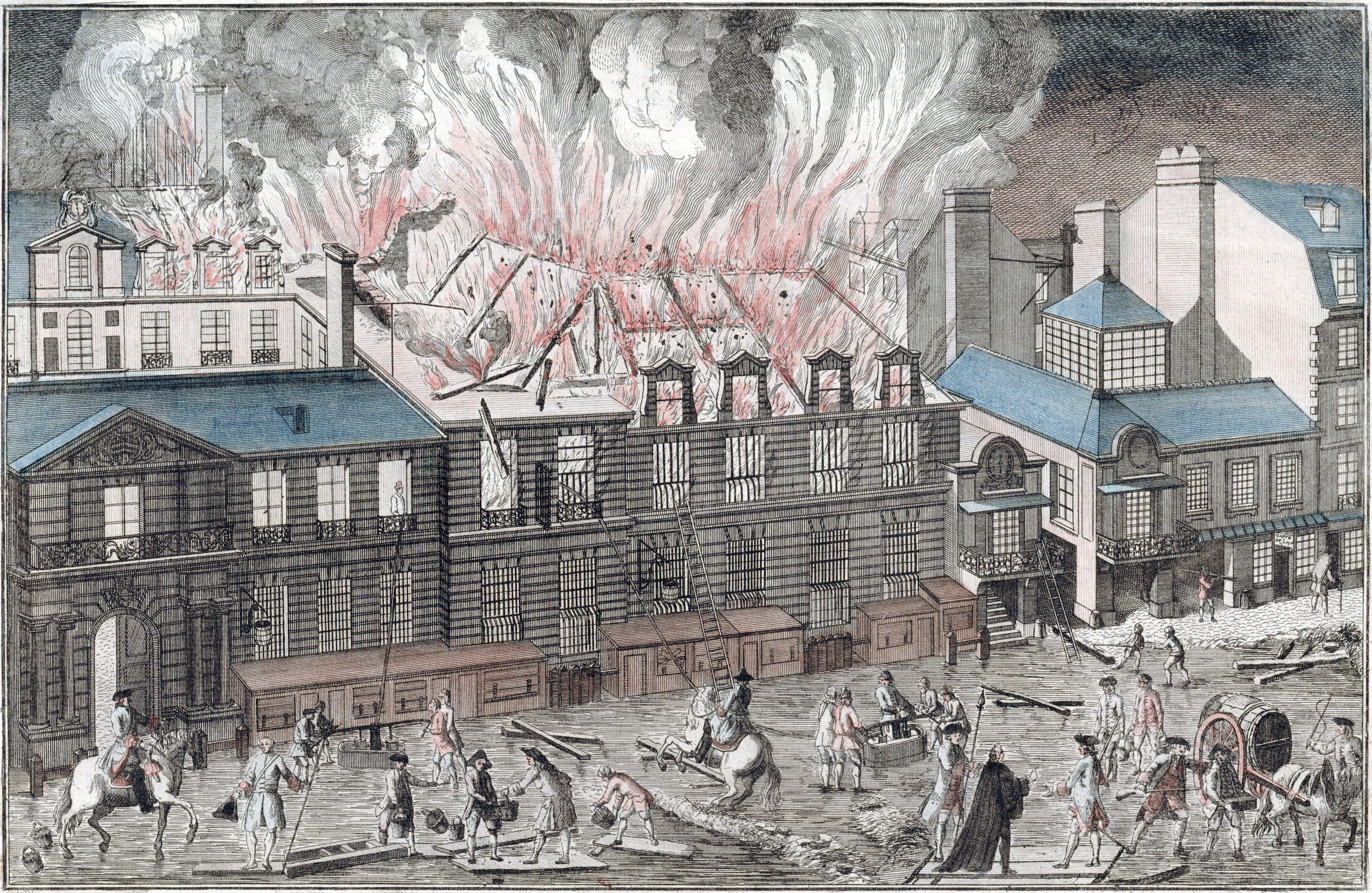
Fire at the main hall of the Académie Royale de Musique at the Palais Royal 6 April 1763

Jean-Claude Trial (13 December 1732 - 23 June 1771) was a French composer and, with Pierre Montan Berton, co-director of the Académie Royale de Musique 1767-1771, following François Francœur and François Rebel and preceding Antoine Dauvergne and Nicolas-René Joliveau. It was during his and Berton's directorship that the main hall at the Palais Royal burned down on 6 April 1763.

Trial was born in Avignon, Papal States. His opera Silvie, 1765, co-written with Pierre Montan Berton, was the last pastorale héroïque to be written by French composers. He died in Paris, aged 38, shortly after the destruction of the hall.

== Works, editions and recordings ==
- Sylvie, Fontainebleau 1765
- Théonis ou Le Toucher, Académie Royale de Musique, November 10, 1767
