= Sophie Arnould =

French soprano (1740–1802)

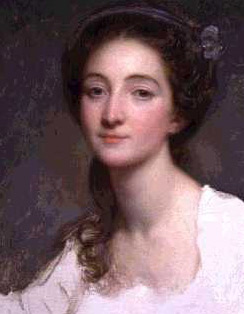
- Portrait of a Lady, called Sophie Arnould by Jean-Baptiste Greuze, c. 1773
- Born: Magdeleine Sophie Arnould; 13 February 1740; Paris, France
- Died: 18 October 1802 (aged 62); Paris, France
- Occupation: Singer
- Children: 4

Sophie Arnould (13 February 1740, in Paris, France – 18 October 1802, in Paris, France) was a French operatic soprano.

== Biography ==
Born Magdeleine Sophie Arnould, she studied in Paris with Marie Fel and La Clairon, and made her stage debut at the Opéra de Paris on 15 December 1757 and sang there for 20 years.

She created for Christoph Wilibald Gluck the roles of Eurydice in Orphée et Eurydice and the title role in Iphigénie en Aulide. She also obtained considerable success in operas by Jean-Philippe Rameau, François Francoeur, and Pierre-Alexandre Monsigny.

Her love life was extremely colorful. Her tumultuous relationship with Louis-Léon de Brancas, duc de Lauragais, resulted in four children, including Antoine-Constant de Brancas, colonel of the First Empire, who died at Essling. She was also the lover of Paul Barras and Nicolas-François de Neufchâteau, among many others. In fact, she was notorious for having as many affairs with women as with men, notably Fanny Raucourt, Mme de Villeroy and the Princess of Hénin.

According to her contemporaries, her voice was more beautiful than powerful, but she was a passionate actress. Her lack of discipline in both her professional and personal life led to a premature vocal decline. However, she was able to retire in 1778 with an enviable pension of 2000 pounds (livres).

She was much in demand in Parisian society, and legend has it that Madame de Pompadour told her "With such talents, you could become a Princess". She was painted by Maurice Quentin de La Tour, and left her Souvenirs and an abundant correspondence.

== Opera by Pierné ==
French composer Gabriel Pierné wrote an opera based on her tumultuous life entitled Sophie Arnould (1927).
