= François-Joseph Gossec =

French composer and conductor (1734–1829)

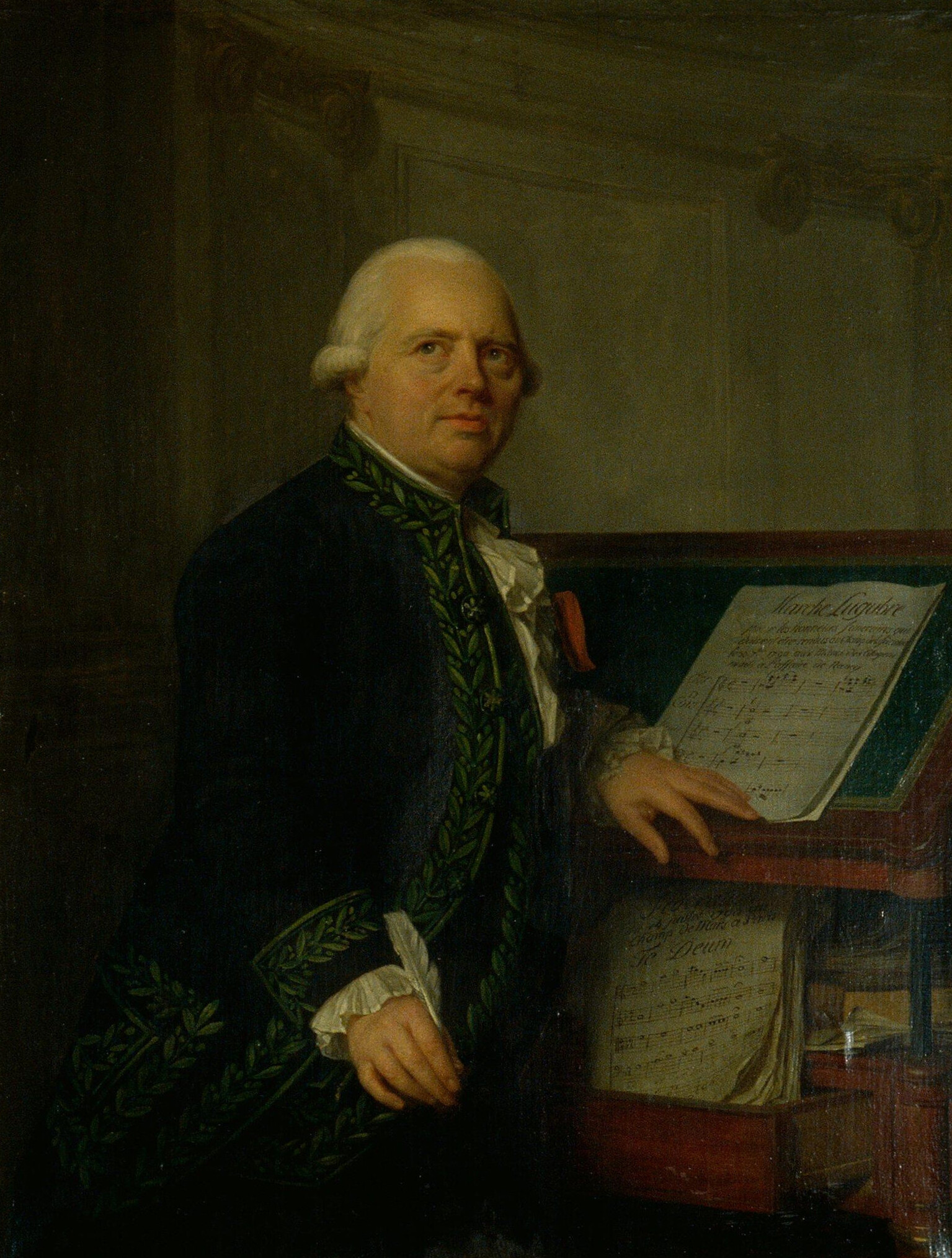
- François-Joseph Gossec, by Antoine Vestier
- Born: 17 January 1734; Vergnies, France
- Died: 16 February 1829 (aged 95); Passy, France
- Era: Classical

François-Joseph Gossec (French pronunciation: [fʁɑ̃swa ʒozɛf ɡɔsɛk]; 17 January 1734 – 16 February 1829) was a French composer of operas, string quartets, symphonies, and choral works.

== Life and work ==
The son of a small farmer, Gossec was born at the village of Vergnies, then a French exclave in the Austrian Netherlands, now an ancienne commune in the municipality of Froidchapelle, Belgium. Showing an early taste for music, he became a choir-boy in Antwerp. He went to Paris in 1751 and was taken on by the composer Jean-Philippe Rameau. He followed Rameau as the conductor of a private orchestra kept by the fermier général Le Riche de La Poupelinière, a wealthy amateur and patron of music. Gradually he became determined to do something to revive the study of instrumental music in France.

Gossec's own first symphony was performed in 1754, and as conductor to the Prince de Condé's orchestra he produced several operas and other compositions of his own. He imposed his influence on French music with remarkable success. His Requiem premiered in 1760, a ninety-minute piece which made him famous overnight. Years later, in 1778, Mozart visited Gossec during a trip to Paris, and described him in a letter to his father as "a very good friend and a very dry man."

Gossec founded the Concert des Amateurs in 1769 and when he gave up his duties conducting the ensemble in 1773—succeeded by his Concertmaster Joseph Bologne, Chevalier de Saint-Georges—he reorganised the Concert Spirituel together with Simon Le Duc and Pierre Gaviniès. In this concert series he conducted his own symphonies as well as those by his contemporaries, particularly works by Joseph Haydn, whose music had become increasingly popular in Paris, finally even superseding Gossec's symphonic work.

In the 1780s Gossec's symphonic output decreased as he began concentrating on operas. He organized the École de Chant in 1784, together with Etienne Méhul, was conductor of the band of the Garde Nationale of the French Revolution, and was appointed (with Méhul and Luigi Cherubini) inspector of the Conservatoire de Musique at its creation in 1795. He was an original member of the Institut and a chevalier of the Legion of Honour. In 1803, he met Napoleon, who admired Gossec very much and asked him if he wanted to work under him, which Gossec declined. In 1815, after the defeat of his friend Napoleon at Waterloo, the Conservatoire was closed for some time by Louis XVIII, and the eighty-one-year-old Gossec had to retire. Until 1817 he worked on his last compositions, including a third Te Deum, and was supported by a pension granted by the Conservatoire.

He died in the Parisian suburb of Passy. The funeral service was attended by former colleagues, including Cherubini, at Père Lachaise Cemetery in Paris. His grave is near those of Méhul and Grétry.

Some of his techniques anticipated the innovations of the Romantic era: he scored his Te Deum for 1,200 singers and 300 wind instruments, and several oratorios require the physical separation of multiple choirs, including invisible ones behind the stage. He wrote several works in honor of the French Revolution, including Le Triomphe de la République, and L'Offrande à la Liberté. Gossec's gavotte from his opera Rosine, ou L'épouse abandonnée (1786), remains familiar in popular culture because Carl Stalling and Charles M. Jones used arrangements of it in several Warner Brothers cartoons.

Gossec was little known outside France, and his own numerous compositions, sacred and secular, were overshadowed by those of more famous composers; but he was an inspiration to many, and powerfully stimulated the revival of instrumental music.

== Works ==
=== Symphonies ===
- Sei sinfonie a più strumenti op. 4 (1759)
- Sei sinfonie a più strumenti op. 5 (1761)
- Six symphonies op. 6 (1762)
- Six symphonies à grand orchestre op. 12 (1769)
- Deux symphonies (1773)
- Symphonie No. 1 (c. 1771–1774)
- Symphonie No. 2 (c. 1771–1774)
- Symphonie en fa majeur (1774)
- Symphonie de chasse (1776)
- Symphonie en ré (1776)
- Symphonie en ré (1777)
- Symphonie concertante en fa majeur No. 2, à plusieurs instruments (1778)
- Symphonie en do majeur for wind orchestra (1794)
- Symphonie à 17 parties (1809)

=== Chamber music ===
- Sei sonate a due violini e basso, Op. 1 (c. 1753)
- Sei quartetti per flauto e violino o sia per due violini, alto e basso, Op. 14 (1769)
- Six quatuors à deux violons, alto et basse, Op. 15 (1772)

=== Vocal and choral works ===
- Messe des morts (Requiem) (1760)
- La Nativité, oratorio (1774)
- Te Deum (1779)
- Te Deum à la Fête de la Fédération for three voices, men's chorus and wind orchestra (1790)
- Hymne sur la translation du corps de Voltaire au Panthéon for three voices, men's chorus and wind orchestra (1791)
- Le Chant du 14 juillet (Marie-Joseph Chénier) for three voices, men's chorus and wind orchestra (1791)
- Dernière messe des vivants, for four voices, chorus and orchestra (1813)

=== Operas ===
- Le tonnelier, opéra comique (1765)
- Le faux Lord, opéra comique (1765)
- Les pêcheurs, opéra comique en 1 act (1766)
- Toinon et Toinette, opéra comique (1767)
- Le double déguisement, opéra comique (1767)
- Les agréments d'Hylas et Sylvie, pastorale (1768)
- Sabinus, tragédie lyrique (1773)
- Berthe, opera (1775, not extant)
- Alexis et Daphné, pastorale (1775)
- Philémon et Baucis, pastorale (1775)
- La fête de village, intermezzo (1778)
- Thésée, tragédie lyrique (1782)
- Nitocris, opera (1783)
- Rosine, ou L'épouse abandonnée, opera (1786)
- Le triomphe de la République, ou Le camp de Grandpré, divertissement-lyrique en 1 acte, (Chénier) (1794) – includes a famous Tambourin.
- Les sabots et le cerisier, opera (1803)
