= List of operas by Pierre-Alexandre Monsigny =

This is a list of operas by Pierre-Alexandre Monsigny (1729–1817). The majority of Monsigny's operas were premiered by the Opéra-Comique, first at the Parisian fairs of Saint-Germain and Saint-Laurent, and later (after the company merged with, and became known as, the Comédie-Italienne) at the Hôtel de Bourgogne in Paris. The company also premiered several of his later operas at the Théâtre de la Cour at the Palace of Fontainebleau before presenting them at the Bourgogne. L'îsle sonnante was premiered by the company at the residence of Madame de Montesson in Villers-Cotterêts before it was given at the Bourgogne.

== List ==
Title	Genre	Subdivisions	Libretto	Première date	Place, theatre
Les aveux indiscrets	intermède	1 act	Larabadière, after Jean de La Fontaine	7 February 1759	Opéra-Comique (St Germain), Paris
Le maître en droit	opéra bouffon	2 acts	Pierre-René Lemmonier, after Jean de La Fontaine's Le roi Candule, et le maître en droit	13 February 1760	Opéra-Comique (St Germain), Paris
Le cadi dupé	opéra bouffon	1 act	Pierre-René Lemmonier, after The Thousand and One Nights, and L Gallet's Le tour double, ou le prêté rendu	4 February 1761	Opéra-Comique (St Germain), Paris
On ne s'avise jamais de tout	opéra comique mêlé de morceaux de musique	1 act	Michel-Jean Sedaine, after Jean de La Fontaine	14 September 1761	Opéra-Comique (St Laurent), Paris
Le roi et le fermier	comédie mêlée de morceaux de musique	3 acts	Michel-Jean Sedaine, after Robert Dodsley's The King and the Miller of Mansfield (1737)	22 November 1762	Comédie-Italienne (Bourgogne), Paris
Le nouveau monde	divertissement		Charles-Simon Favart, after Simon-Joseph Pellegrin	written 1763	unperformed
Rose et Colas	comedy	1 act	Michel-Jean Sedaine, after François-Guillaume Fouques-Deshays Desfontaines's Le van	8 March 1764	Comédie-Italienne (Bourgogne), Paris
Aline, reine de Golconde	ballet héroïque	3 acts	Michel-Jean Sedaine, after Stanislas-Jean de Boufflers La reine de Golconde	15 April 1766	Opéra (Tuileries), Paris
Philémon et Baucis		1 act	Michel-Jean Sedaine	1766 or 1767	Bagnolet or L'lle Adam, Paris
L'île sonnante	opéra comique	3 acts	Collé, after François Rabelais's Le cinquième livre	August 1767	Comédie-Italienne (Villers-Cotterêts)
Le déserteur	drame en prose mêlé de musique	3 acts	Michel-Jean Sedaine	6 March 1769	Comédie-Italienne (Bourgogne), Paris
Le rosière de Salency (in collaboration with Blaise, Egidio Duni, Philidor and van Swieten)	ballet pastoral	3 acts		25 October 1769	Comédie-Italienne (Fontainebleau)
Le faucon	opéra comique en prose mêlé d'ariettes	1 act	Michel-Jean Sedaine, after Jean de La Fontaine	2 November 1772	Comédie-Italienne (Fontainebleau)
La belle Arsène	comédie-féerie mêlée d'ariettes	3 acts	Charles-Simon Favart, after Voltaire's La bégueule	6 November 1773	Comédie-Italienne (Fontainebleau)
La belle Arsène (revised version)	comédie-féerie	4 acts	Charles-Simon Favart, after Voltaire's La bégueule	4 August 1775	Comédie-Italienne (Bourgogne)
Félix, ou L'enfant trouvé	comédie	3 acts	Michel-Jean Sedaine	10 November 1777	Comédie-Italienne (Fontainebleau)
Pagamin de Monègue	opéra lyri-comique	1 act	Michel-Jean Sedaine		refused by Opéra, 1785
Robin et Marion					unperformed
