= Guéret (surname) =

Guéret is a French surname. Notable people with the surname include:

- Anne Guéret (1760–1805), French painter, sister of Louise
- Cécile Guéret (born 1954), Central African Republic activist and politician
- Christelle Guéret, French operations researcher and computer scientist
- Louise Catherine Guéret (1755–1851), French painter, sister of Anne
- Romane Gueret, French film director
- Willy Guéret (born 1973), French footballer
