= Les femmes vengées =

1775 one-act opéra comique by François-André Danican Philidor

Les femmes vengées, ou Les feintes infidélités (Avenged Women, or Feigned Infidelity) is a one-act opéra comique by François-André Danican Philidor to a libretto by Michel-Jean Sedaine after Jean de La Fontaine's "Les rémois" from the third part (1671) of his collection of ribald short stories, Contes et nouvelles en vers. It was first performed on 20 March 1775 at the Comédie-Italienne (Hôtel de Bourgogne, Paris.

The plot of the opera is similar to Così fan tutte which W. A. Mozart, who was in Paris during the first performances of Philidor's opera, composed in 1790.

== Recordings ==
- Opera Lafayette, 2015, Ryan Brown conducting
