= Le cadi dupé =

Opera by Christoph Willibald Gluck

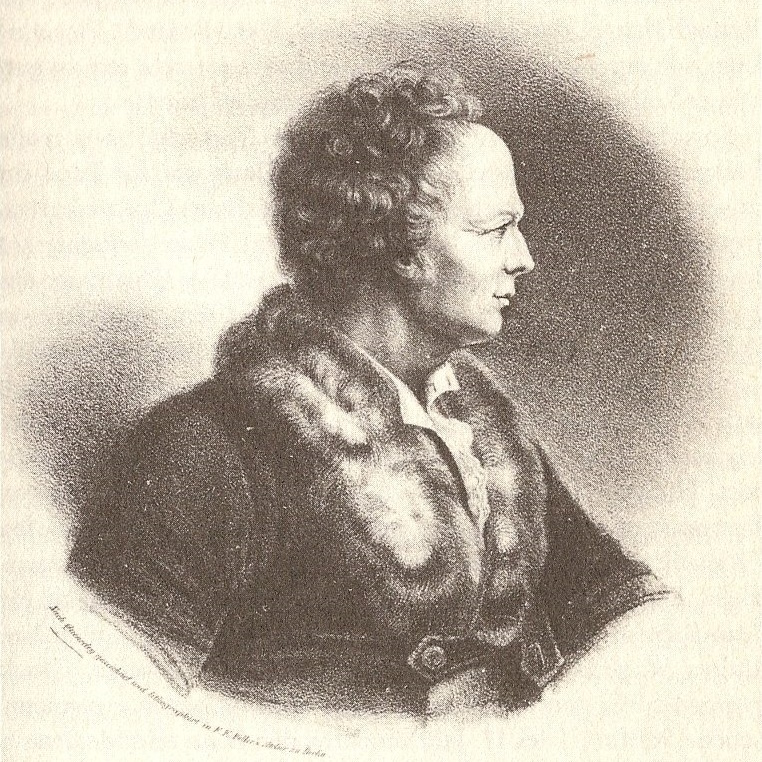
Portrait of Christoph Willibald Gluck, ca. 1750

Le cadi dupé (The Duped Qadi, or The Duped Judge) is an opéra comique in one act by Christoph Willibald Gluck. It has a French-language libretto by Pierre-René Lemonnier. It premiered at the Burgtheater in Vienna on 8 December 1761. The libretto had already been set by Pierre-Alexandre Monsigny in an opera that had premiered on 4 February of the same year at the Paris Foire St-Germain.

The music belongs to the Turkish-influenced fashion of the period and features janissary music, represented by piccolo, drums, and cymbals.

== Roles ==
Role	Voice type	Premiere Cast, Vienna, Burgtheater, December 8, 1761 (Conductor: - )
Cadi, the judge	basse-taille	Vincent Hédoux
Fatime, his wife	soprano	Mme Hédoux
Zelmire	soprano	Mme Guérin
Nouradin	taille	M. Darcis
Omar, a dyer	basse-taille	Jean Baptist Rousselois
Ali, Omar's daughter	taille (travesti)	Gabriel Soullé
An Aga, or Lieutenant of the Cadi	spoken role	Antoine Durval

== Synopsis ==
The Cadi has been flirting with other women and neglecting his wife, Fatima. The mischievous Zelmire, who is in love with Nuradin, tricks the Cadi in order to teach him a lesson. She pretends to be Omar's daughter, Ali, who is considered less than desirable. The duped Cadi plans to divorce Fatima in order to marry the pretending Zelmire, but the truth is eventually revealed.
