= Giustino Menescardi =

Italian painter (1720–1776)

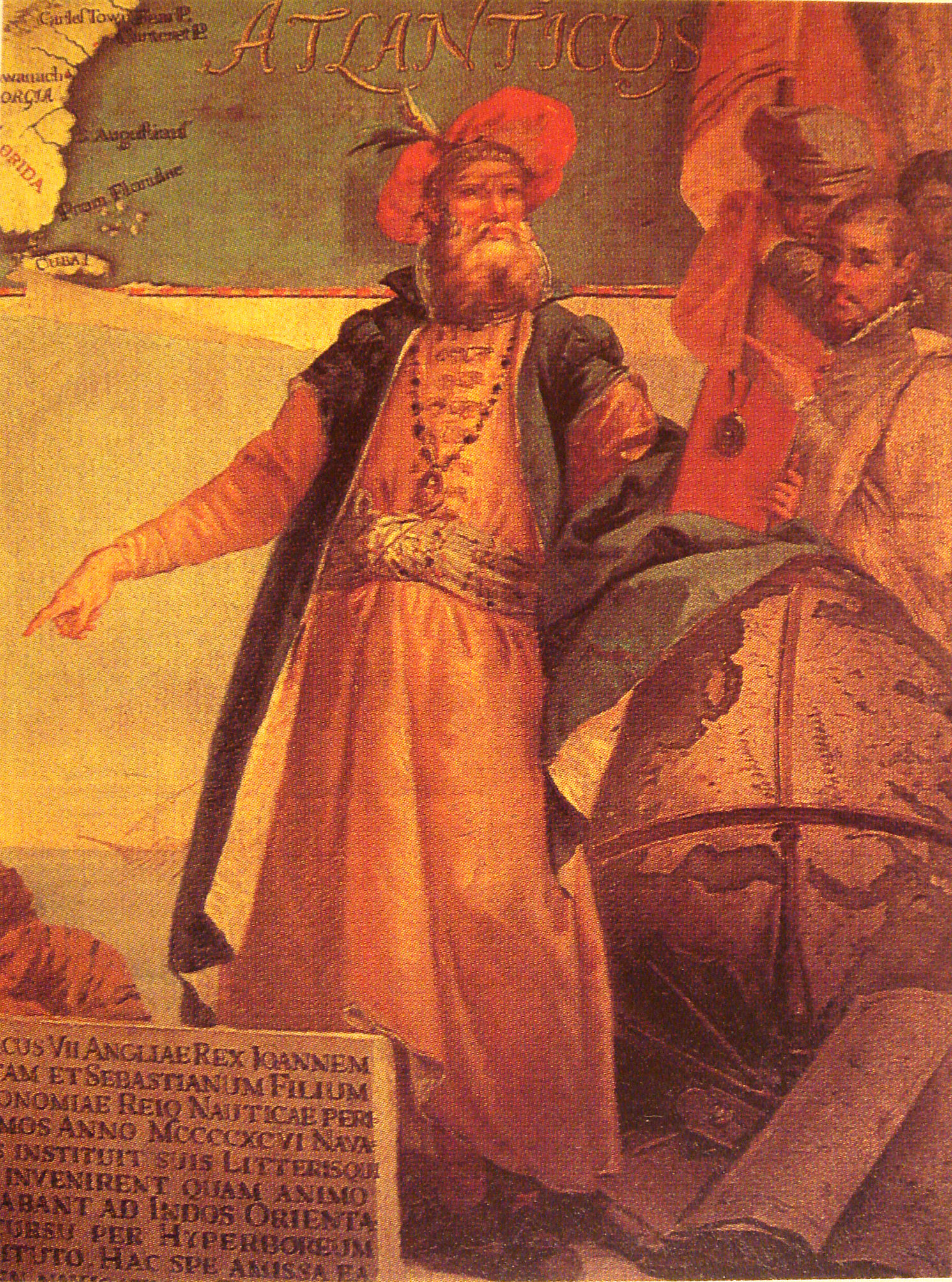
Detail of painting on history of Maps, depicting John Cabot in Palazzo Ducale of Venice.

Giustino Menescardi (1720–1776) was an Italian painter and scenic designer, active in Northern Italy and Venice in a late Baroque style.

== Biography ==
Little is known about his training. His works appear to display the influence of Tiepolo. In the Carnavals of 1756 and 1757, he collaborated with Francesco Grassi in the scenography for the Teatro Ducale and in the commedie francesi being enacted in the Theater of Colorno. On 28 January he was paid 704 lire for his work as a scenographer in the French opera-ballet Zelindor and Gl'Inca in Peroù and Les sauvages, as well as the work Aci e Galatea. He painted the canvas of St Augustine triumphs over Heresy for the church of Santo Stefano, Venice. he also painted for the Sala dell'Archivio of the Scuola Grande dei Carmini and in the Ducal Palace of Venice.

A Resurrection of Christ attributed to Menascardi is in the Hood Museum of Art at Dartmouth College.

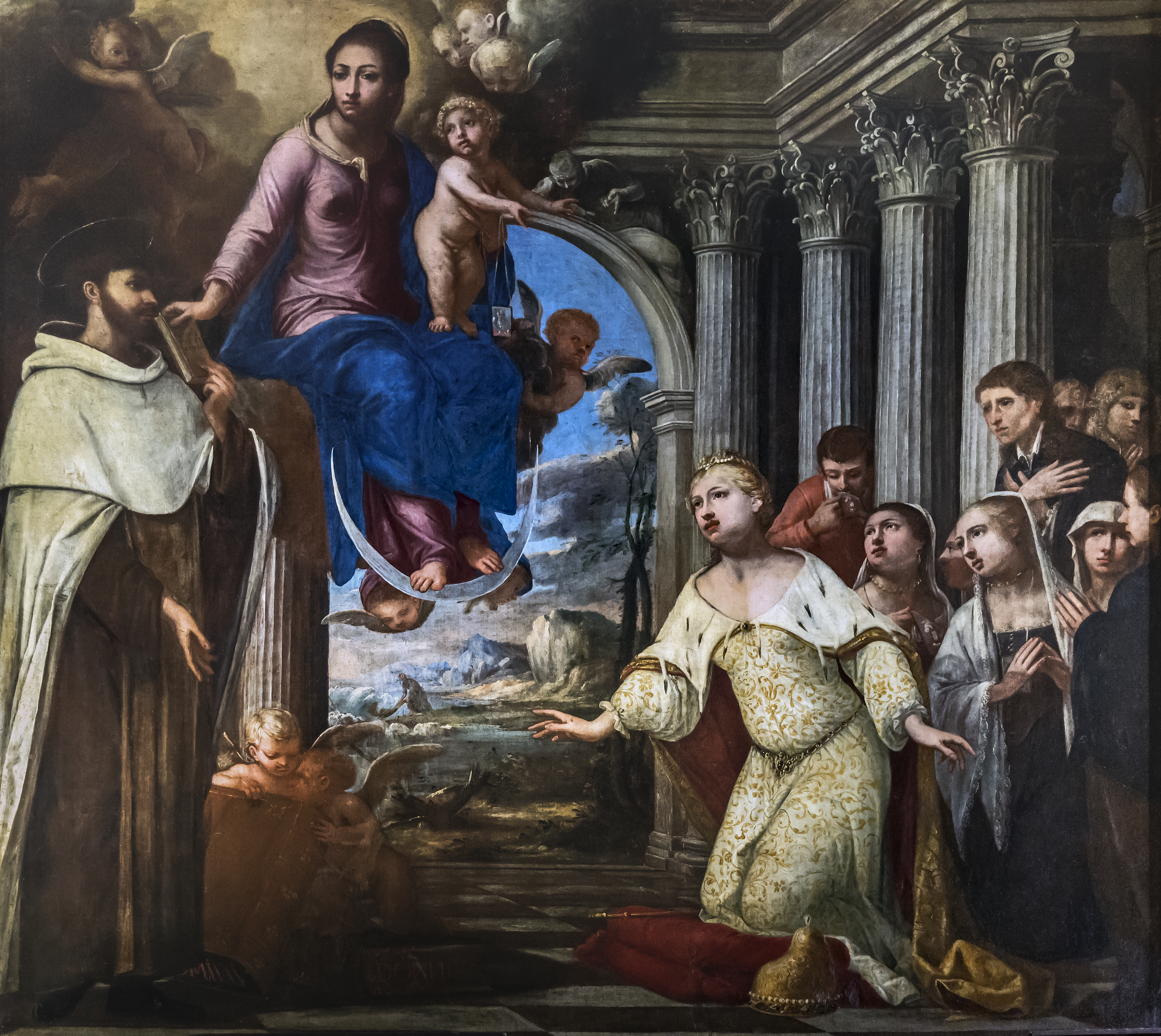
The allegory of Venice in Doge's clothes kneeling before the Virgin. Scuola Grande dei Carmini
