= Opera Lafayette =

Baroque opera company based in Washington, D.C.

Coordinates: 38.882958°N 76.993067°W

- Named after: Marquis de Lafayette
- Formation: 1994
- Founder: Ryan Brown
- Founded at: Washington, D.C., United States
- Headquarters: Old Naval Hospital
- Conductor and Artistic Director: Patrick Quigley
- Executive Director: Lisa Mion
- Board Chair: Nizam P. Kettaneh
- Website: operalafayette.org
- Formerly called: Violins of Lafayette

Opera Lafayette is a baroque opera company based in Washington, D.C., that produces French operas from the 17th and 18th centuries. It was founded in 1995 by Ryan Brown and is the only opera company to produce its full season in both Washington and New York City.

== History ==
Specializing in French Baroque opera, Opera Lafayette was founded in Washington's Capitol Hill neighborhood in 1994 by Ryan Brown as the Violins of Lafayette, named after the Marquis de Lafayette. It adopted its current name during 2001 and, in 2005, released its first recording on the Naxos label, Christoph Willibald Gluck's Orphée et Euridice. In 2012, Opera Lafayette staged its first international performance, Pierre-Alexandre Monsigny's Le roi et le fermier (The King and the Farmer); this "forgotten" Monsigny work was performed at the Royal Opera of Versailles using recently discovered backdrops from a 1780 staging of the opera. An ensemble from the company performed aboard the French frigate Hermione, a replica of the 32-gun Concorde class frigate that once ferried the Marquis de Lafayette to the United States, during its 2015 visit to Alexandria, Virginia.

According to the New York Times, Opera Lafayette has "won consistent praise and loyal audiences for its historically informed productions of French Baroque operas using period instruments, appropriate costumes and elegant dancing". The paper has further described it as "a skillful purveyor of French Baroque operas", while DC Theatre Scene has said the company "should be considered a national treasure".

Opera Lafayette's 2011 recording of Sancho Panca (sample)

== Organization ==
As of 2019, the opera's conductor and artistic director is Ryan Brown, Lisa Mion is the managing director, and Nizam Kettaneh and Dorsey C. Dunn are the co-chairs of the company's board of directors. The concertmaster of Opera Lafayette's orchestra is Jacob Ashworth.

On July 20, 2023, Opera Lafayette announced the appointment of Patrick Dupré Quigley as Artistic Director Designate, effective immediately. Quigley formally assumed the Artistic Director role in 2025.

The company performs a split season with performances in Washington at the Kennedy Center, and in New York at Frederick P. Rose Hall.

In 2025, a collaboration between Opera Lafayette and OperaCréole premiered Edmond Dédé's opera Morgiane, nearly 130 years after it was completed by the composer in 1887.

== Discography ==
Opera Lafayette has released a few recordings, all on the Naxos label:

1. Orphée et Euridice by Christoph Willibald Gluck (2005)
2. Oedipe à Colone by Antonio Sacchini (2006)
3. Rameau Operatic Arias sung by Jean-Paul Fouchécourt (2007)
4. Armide by Jean-Baptiste Lully (2008)
5. Zélindor, roi des Sylphes by François Rebel and Le Trophée by François Francoeur (2009)
6. Le déserteur by Pierre-Alexandre Monsigny (2010)
7. Sancho Pança by François-André Danican Philidor (2011)
8. Le magnifique by André Grétry (2012)
9. Le roi et le fermier by Pierre-Alexandre Monsigny (2013)
10. Lalla-Roukh by Félicien David (2014)
11. Les femmes vengées by François-André Danican Philidor (2015)
1. L'épreuve villageoise, by André-Ernest-Modeste Grétry, 2016
2. Les fêtes de l'Hymen et de l'Amour, by Rameau
3. Léonore, ou L'amour conjugal, by Pierre Gaveaux, 2018.

Selections from the above recordings are included in the two CDs accompanying a Naxos book, A–Z of Opera, 2nd Edition.
