= Armide (Lully) =

Opera by Jean-Baptiste Lully

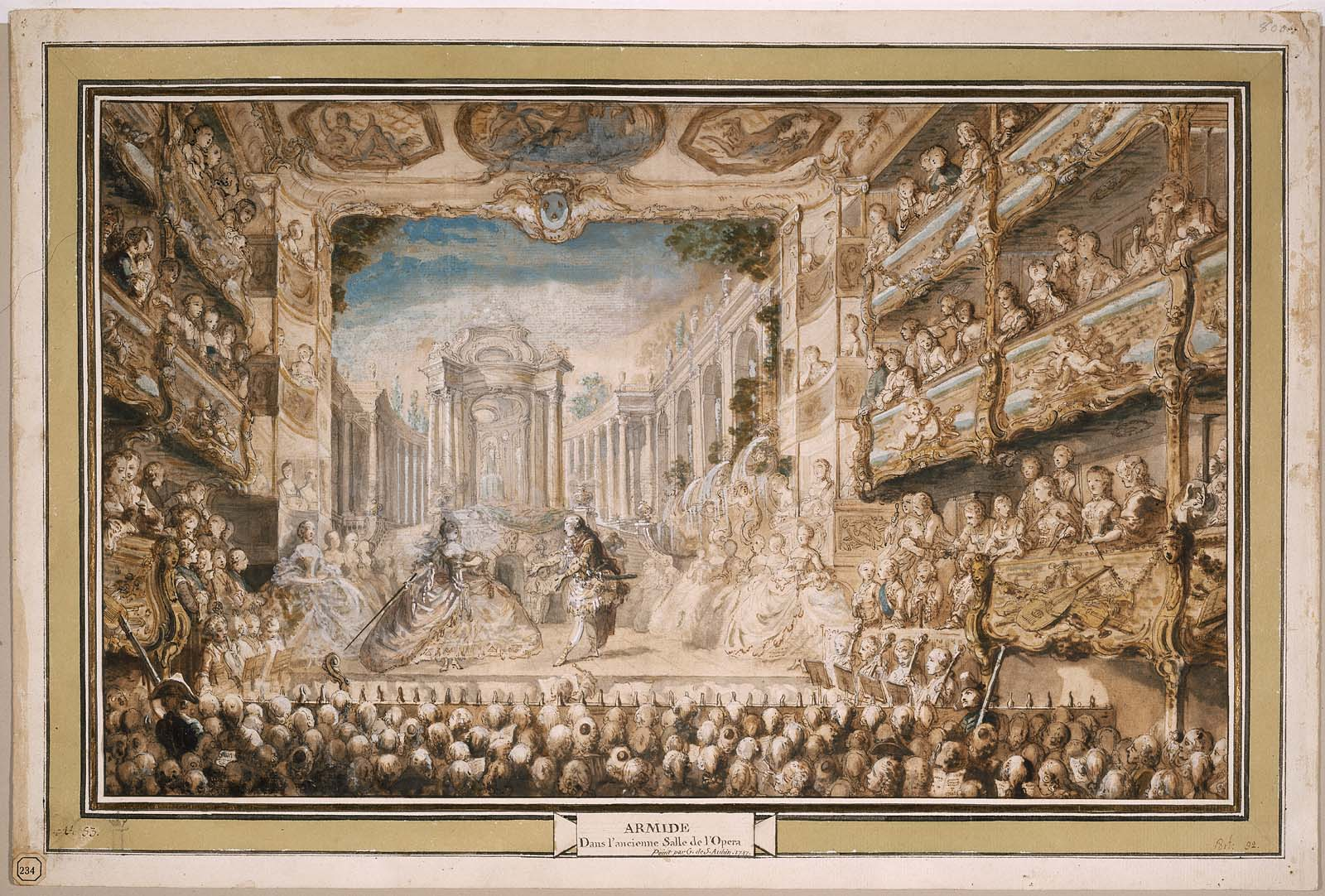
Lully's Armide at the Palais-Royal Opera House in 1761, watercolor by Gabriel de Saint-Aubin

Armide is an opera in five acts by Jean-Baptiste Lully. The libretto by Philippe Quinault is based on Torquato Tasso's poem La Gerusalemme liberata (Jerusalem Delivered). The work is in the form of a tragédie en musique, a genre invented by Lully and Quinault.

Critics in the 18th century regarded Armide as Lully's masterpiece. It continues to be well-regarded, featuring some of the best-known music in French baroque opera and being arguably ahead of its time in its psychological interest. Unlike most of his operas, Armide concentrates on the sustained psychological development of a character – not Renaud, who spends most of the opera under Armide's spell, but Armide, who repeatedly tries without success to choose vengeance over love.

== Performance history ==
Armide was first performed on 15 February 1686 by the Paris Opera at the Théâtre du Palais-Royal, with scenery by Bérain, in the presence of the Grand Dauphin. The subject for the opera was chosen for Lully by King Louis XIV. However, the king would not attend the première or any of the following performances, possibly because Lully was involved in a homosexual scandal. The opera was well received by the Parisians and was revived by the Paris Opera in 1703, 1713–14, 1724, 1746–47, 1761, and 1764. Between 1686 and 1751 Armide was mounted in Marseille, Brussels, Lyon, Lunéville and perhaps Metz, and was also produced abroad in The Hague, Berlin (with revisions by Carl Heinrich Graun) and apparently, in two concert performances, in Rome.

On 5 November 2005, almost 320 years later, Opera Atelier of Toronto gave Armide its North American premiere under conductor Andrew Parrott and music director David Fallis.

== Roles ==
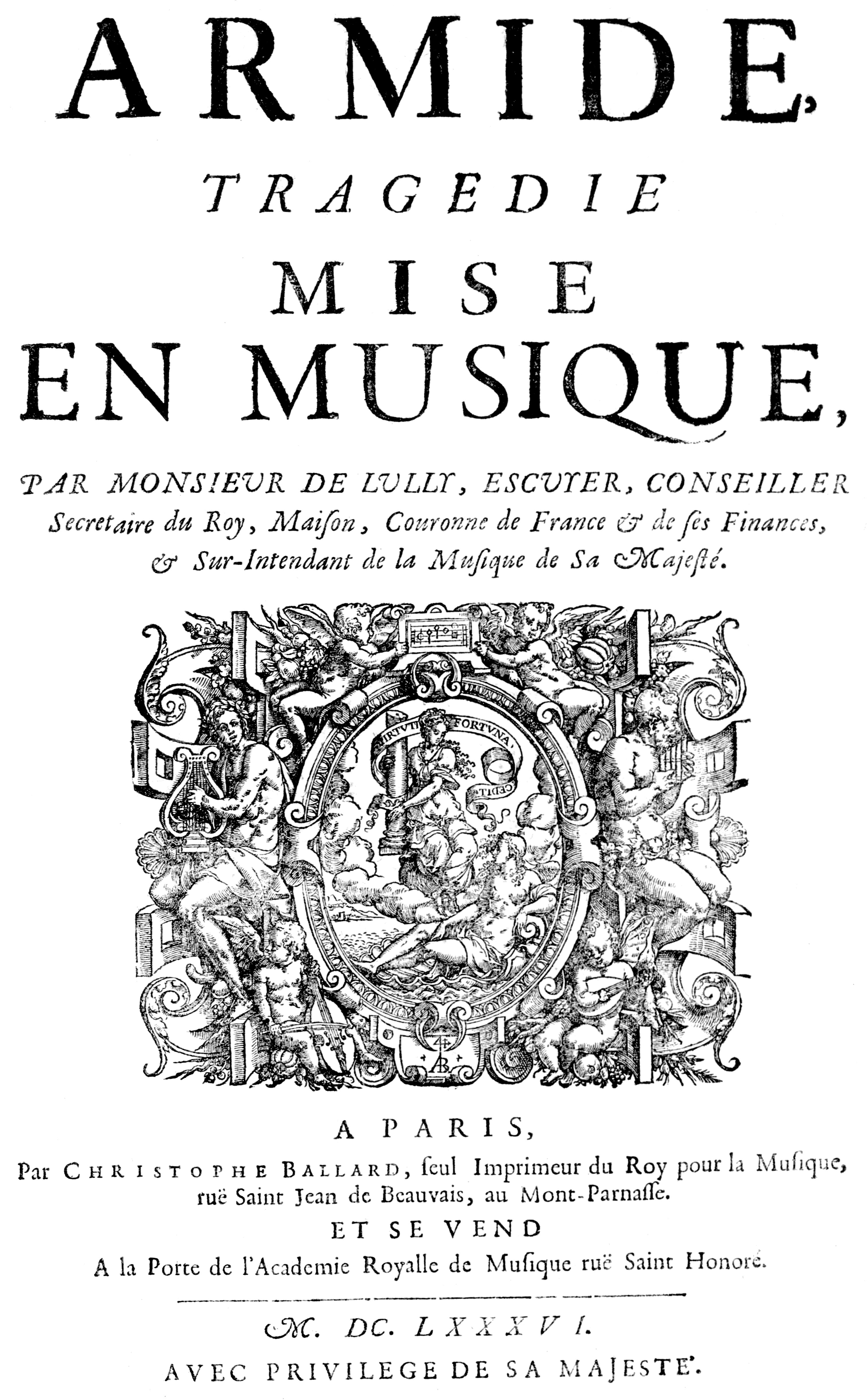
Title page of the score's first edition, Paris 1686

Role	Voice type	Premiere cast, 15 February 1686 (Conductor: Pascal Collasse)
Allegorical Prologue
La Gloire [Glory]	soprano	
La Sagesse [Wisdom]	soprano	
Main Plot
Armide, magician, niece of Hidraot	soprano	Marie Le Rochois
Renaud, a knight	haute-contre	Louis Gaulard Dumesny
Phénice, a confidante of Armide	soprano	Marie-Louise Desmatins
Sidonie, a confidante of Armide	soprano	Françoise Fanchon Moreau, la Cadette
Hidraot, magician, King of Damascus	basse-taille (bass-baritone)	Jean Dun père
Aronte, guard of Armide's captive knights	basse-taille	
Artémidor, a knight	taille (baritenor)	
La Haine [Hatred]	taille	M. Frère
Ubalde, a knight	basse-taille	
The Danish Knight, companion of Ubalde	haute-contre	
A Demon in the form of a Water Nymph	soprano	
A Demon in the form of Lucinde, the Danish Knight's beloved	soprano	
A Demon in the form of Melisse, Ubalde's beloved	soprano	
A fortunate lover	haute-contre	
Heroes who follow Glory; nymphs who follow Wisdom; people of Damascus; demons disguised as nymphs, shepherds and shepherdesses; flying demons disguised as Zephyrs; followers of Hatred, the Furies, Cruelty, Vengeance, Rage, etc.; demons disguised as rustics; Pleasures; demons disguised as happy lovers

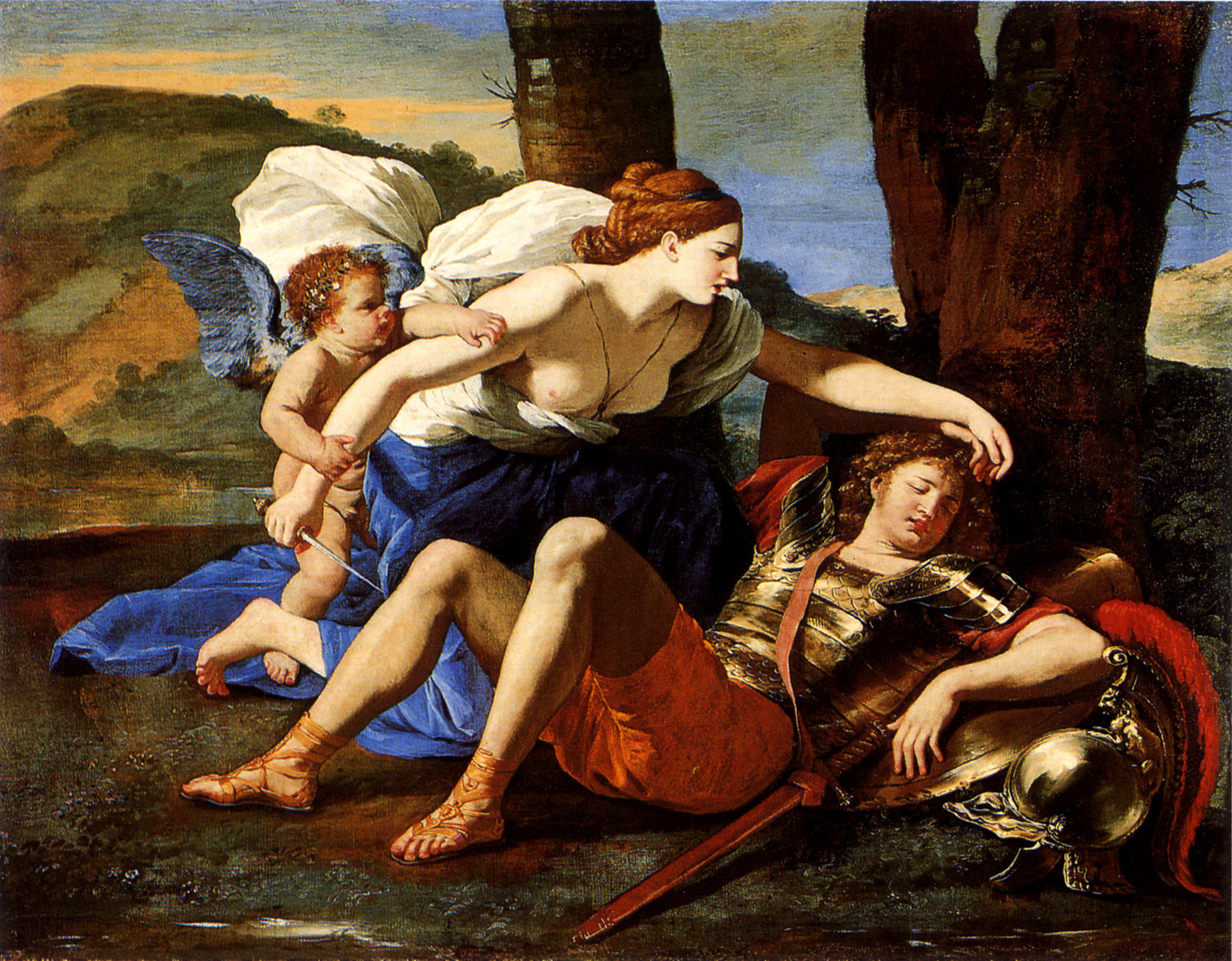
Rinaldo and Armida by Nicolas Poussin, 1629

== Synopsis ==
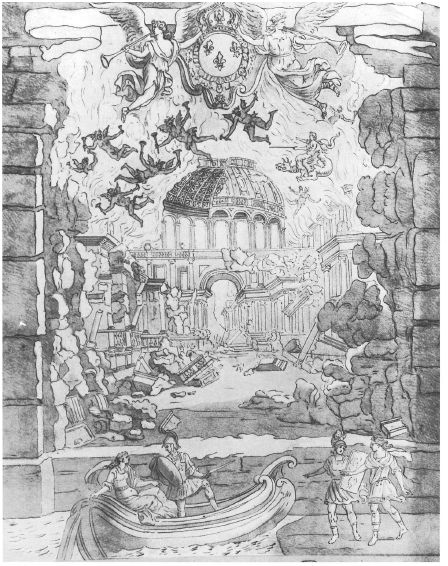
One of Jean Bérain's designs for the first staging of Armide, 1686

During the First Crusade, Armide ensnares her enemy the Christian knight Renaud with her magic spells. At the moment she raises her dagger to kill him, she finds herself falling in love with him. She casts a spell to make him love her in return. Upon returning to her castle, she cannot bear that Renaud's love is only the work of enchantment. She calls on the Goddess of Hate to restore her hatred for Renaud, but fails to escape from her feelings of love for him. The Goddess condemns Armide to eternal love. Before Armide can return to Renaud, two of his fellow soldiers reach Renaud and break Armide's spell. Renaud manages to escape from Armide, who is left enraged, despairing, and hopeless.

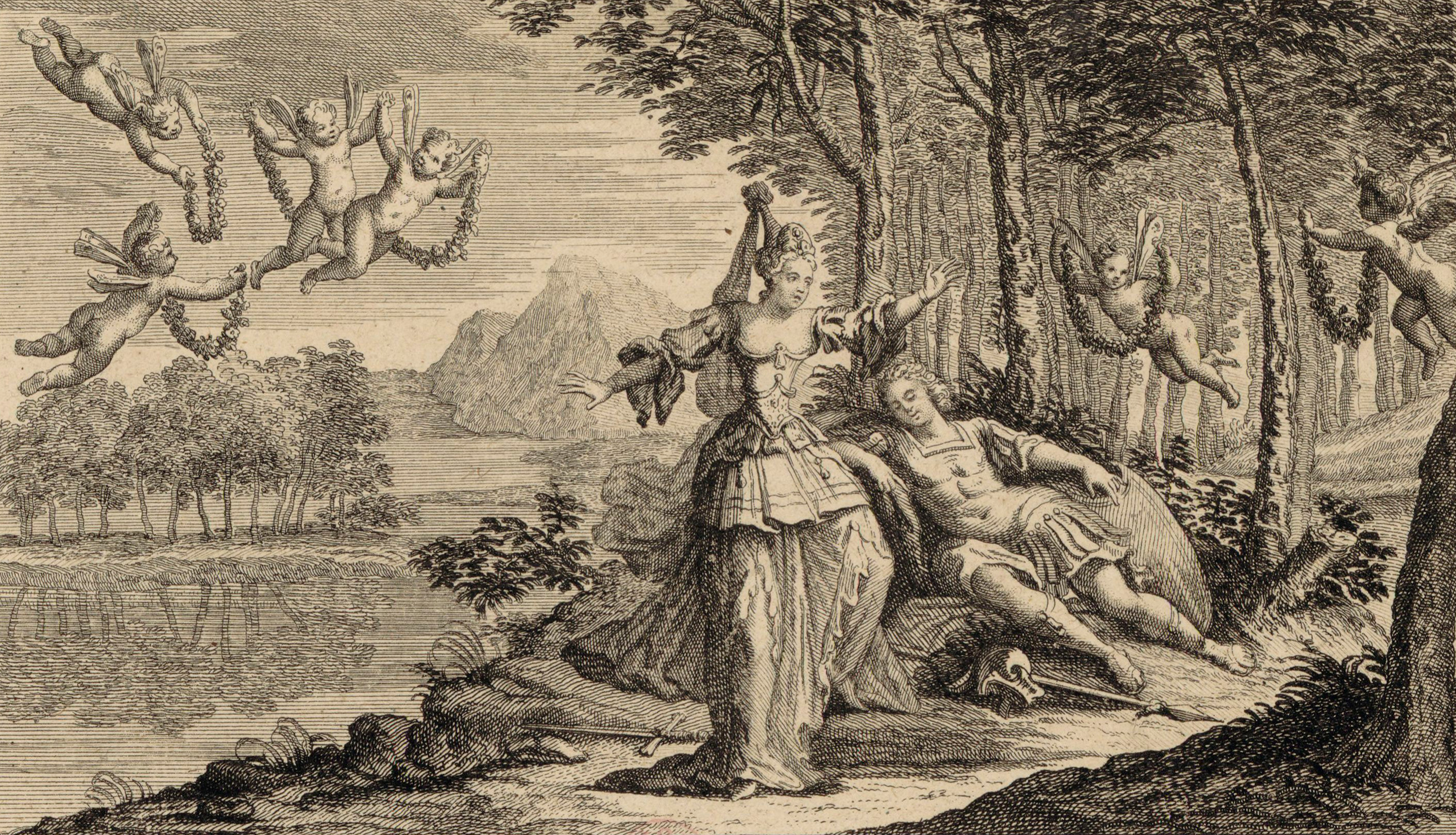
Scene from act II, engraving from a score, 1700

== History and analysis ==
Roughly eight decades following Monteverdi's L'Orfeo, Jean-Baptiste Lully produced Armide with his longtime collaborator, playwright Jean-Philippe Quinault. Together they had developed the tragédie en musique, or tragédie lyrique, which served as a new form of opera that combined elements of classical French drama with ballet, the French song tradition, and a new form of recitative. Armide was one of Lully's last operas and is therefore extremely developed in style.

The opera's instrumental overture is divided into two parts, all with the same highly professional sound, as if to accompany the entrance of a highly revered authority. It is in fact, according to the Norton Anthology of Western Music, a "majesty suitable to the king of France, whose entrance into the theater the overture usually accompanied when he was in attendance". At points it is playful and bouncy, while always remaining ceremonious. The first section of the overture is in duple meter and comparatively sounds slower than the second section, when the meter changes into compound. These two different styles switch off until the conclusion of the piece (in duple meter).

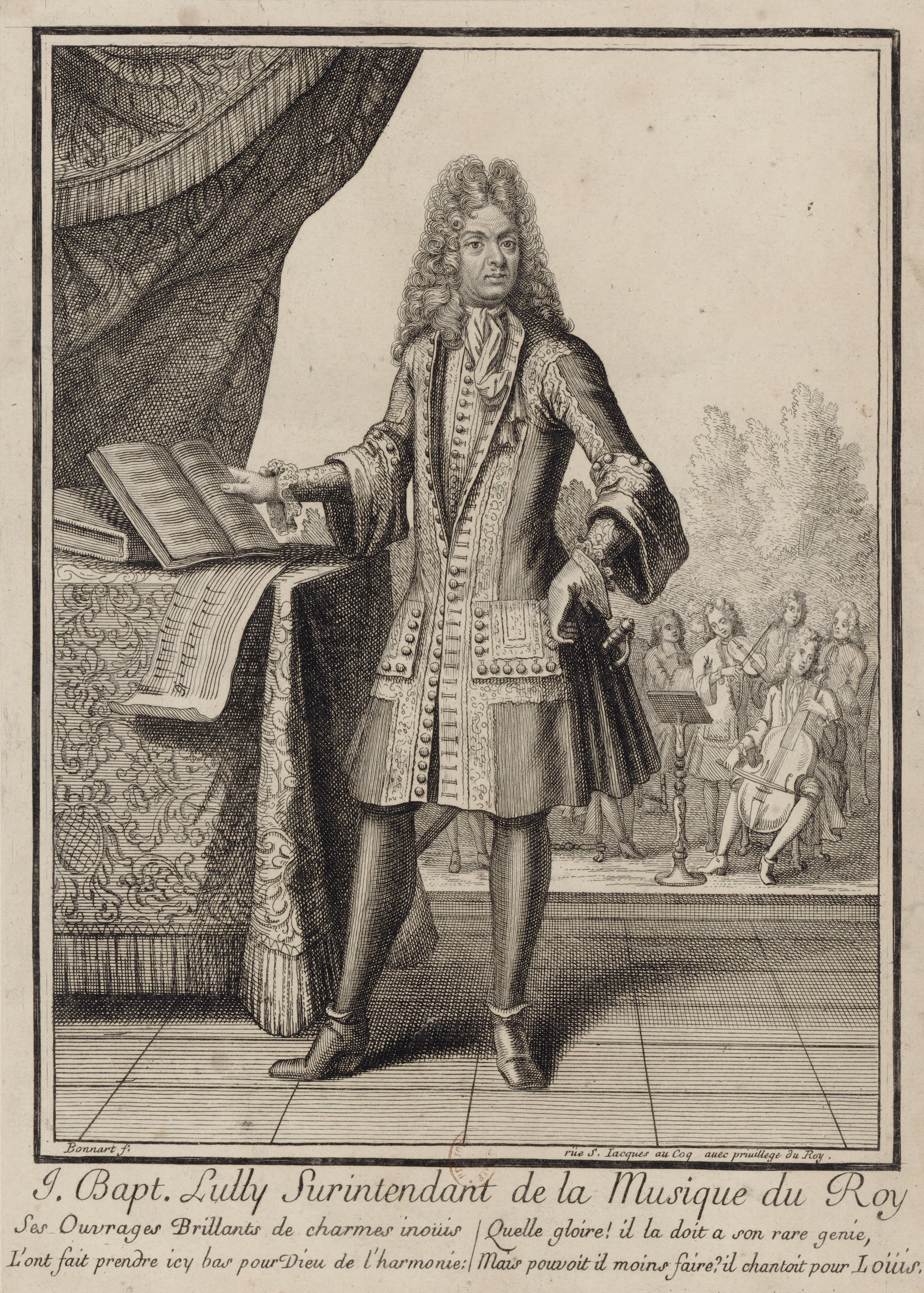
Engraving of the composer, from the score's frontispiece

The most famous moment in the opera is Act II, scene 5, a monologue by the enchantress Armide, considered "one of the most impressive recitatives in all of Lully's operas". Armide, accompanied by only continuo, alternates between glorying in her own power and succumbing to piercing angst. Clutching a dagger, she expresses her unyielding desire to kill the knight Renaud, who has foiled her plan to keep the knights of the Crusades in captivity. Though not elaborate in terms of orchestration, the techniques of dramatic interpretation of rhythm, impressive use of stressing on downbeats, and exaggerated use of rests beautifully complicate this piece.

Renaud had taken on the heroic and courageous duty of freeing these knights, much to the vexation of Armide, who now plans to murder him as quickly and swiftly as she can, while he is fast asleep under her magical spell. A stark sense of hesitation washes over her, and her voice grows softer and more full of doubt as she finds herself unexpectedly falling in love with her sworn enemy. Her passion for revenge, to which she was originally so committed, gives way to her new-found love: "Let us get on with it… I tremble! Let us avenge… I sigh! / My rage is extinguished when I approach him / He seems to be made for love." The exaggerated use of rests is exemplified perfectly here, in measures 38–42, amidst her rage and vengefulness. Armide is struck by her contradictory and confusing feelings of love, and the use of ellipses conveys this dramatic hesitation and inner turmoil.

She reaches a decision far more humane than murdering Renaud, by casting a further spell to make him fall in love with her. The bass amplifies and is much more emphatic in this part, while the supporting dynamic harmony permits a more melodic style. The idea is elaborated with accompanying music that evokes love and idealism, similar to the structure of a minuet. Repetition is also prevalent with the orchestra first introducing the entire melody, and Armide echoing its sentiment. A variation begins with Armide's changing emotions, resulting in a dance-like feel that contains orchestral preludes and a pair of recitative styles.

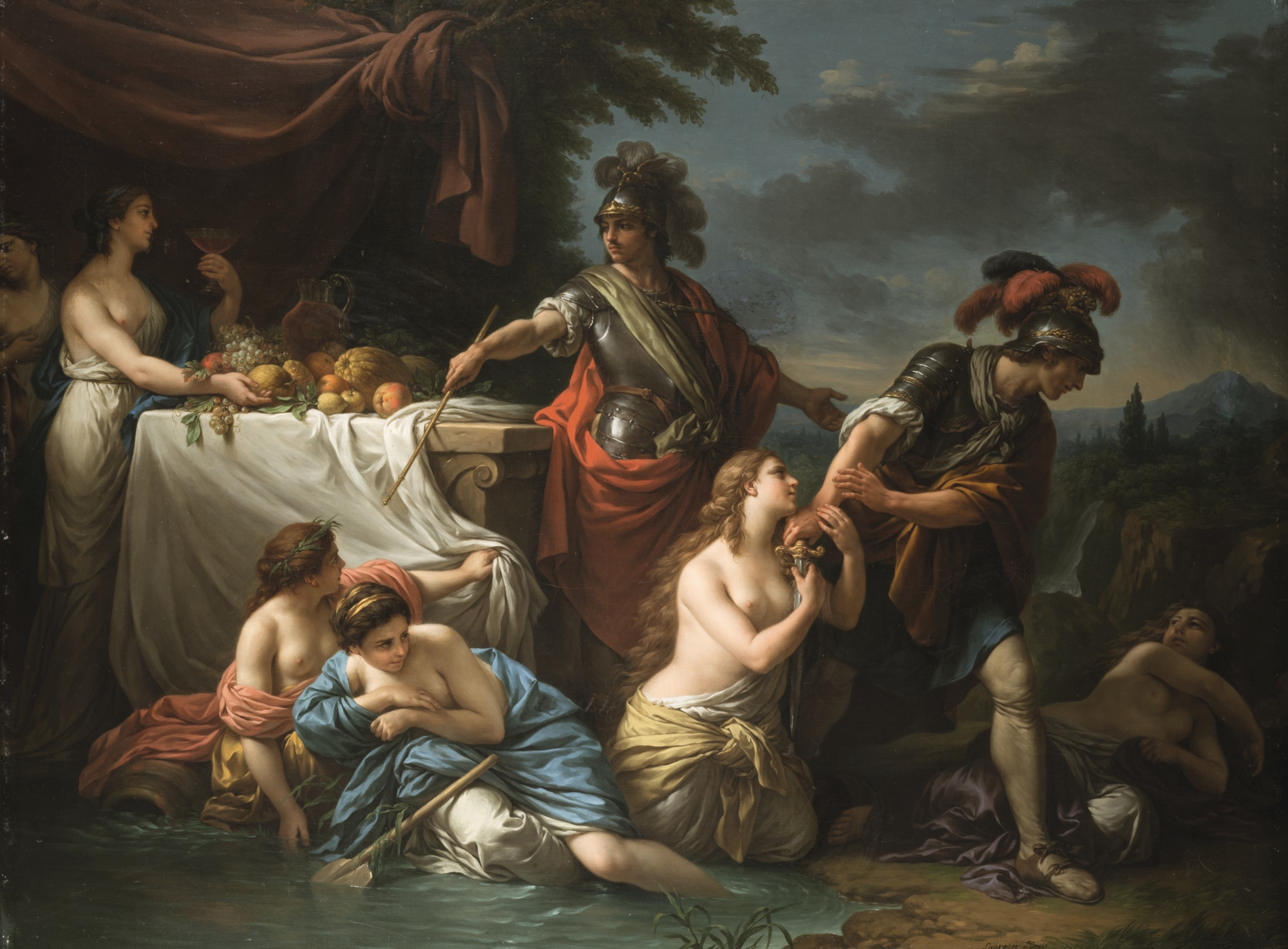
Ubalde et le chevalier Danois Louis Jean Francois Lagrenée

== Film ==
A segment in the 1987 anthology film Aria is based loosely on the plot of Armide. Directed by Jean-Luc Godard, it is set in a gym and uses a selection of music from Philippe Herreweghe's first recording of the opera with Rachel Yakar in the title role. ("Ah! Si la liberté...", "Enfin, il est en ma puissance", "Venez, venez, Haine implacable").

== Recordings ==
Year	Cast (Armide, Renaud)	Conductor, Opera house and orchestra	Label
1983	Rachel Yakar, Zeger Vandersteene	Philippe Herreweghe, La Chapelle Royale	CD: Erato; Cat: STU 715302
1993	Guillemette Laurens, Howard Crook	Philippe Herreweghe, Collegium Vocale, La Chapelle Royale	CD: Erato; Cat: HMC 901456.57
2007	Stephanie Houtzeel, Robert Getchell	Ryan Brown, Opera Lafayette	CD: Naxos; Cat: 8.660209-10MMO 91117
2008	Stéphanie d'Oustrac, Paul Agnew	William Christie, Les Arts Florissants	DVD: Fra Musica; Cat: B01EGQRWV8
2015	Marie-Adeline Henry, Antonio Figueroa	Christophe Rousset, Chœur de Chambre de Namur, Les Talens Lyriques	CD: Aparté; Cat: AP135
2023	Stéphanie d'Oustrac, Cyril Auvity	Vincent Dumestre, Chœur de l'Opéra de Dijon, Le Poème Harmonique	CD: Château des Versailles Spectacles; Cat: CVS124

== See also ==
- Rinaldo, 1711 opera by Handel to a related libretto
- Armide, 1777 opera by Gluck to Quinault's libretto, with some changes added
