= Rose et Colas =

French opera-comique

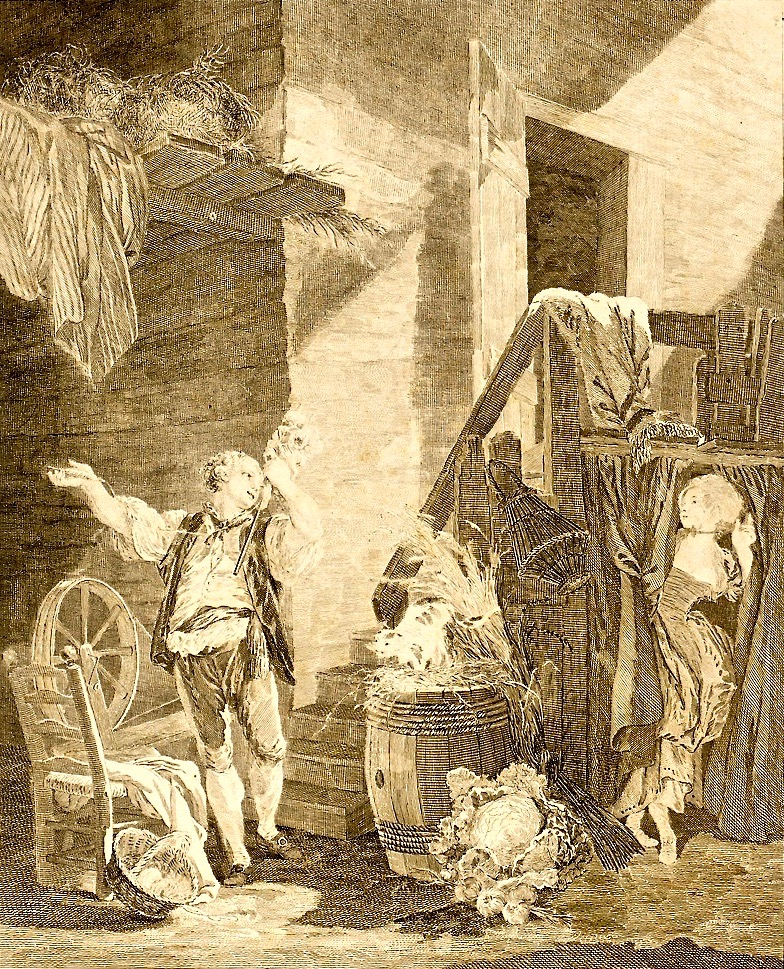
Scene of Rose et Colas (1764)

Rose et Colas is a French opéra-comique in 3 acts by Michel-Jean Sedaine, music by Pierre-Alexandre Monsigny, first performed on the Théâtre-Français at the Hôtel de Bourgogne on 8 March 1764. Rose et Colas is mentioned by Honoré de Balzac in the short story Une double famille (1830). The Lord of Granville is a strong spirit, who hums an aria in Bayeux Cathedral: "Notwithstanding the sanctity of the place, he hummed, while taking holy water, an aria from the opera of Rose and Colas, and guided his son along the side galleries of the nave..."
