= Le roi et le fermier =

Opéra-comique in 3 acts by Pierre-Alexandre Monsigny

Le roi et le fermier is a 1762 opéra-comique in 3 acts by Pierre-Alexandre Monsigny to a libretto by Michel-Jean Sedaine.

== Recording ==
Opera Lafayette
