= La Paix du ménage =

Short story by Honoré de Balzac

Domestic Bliss
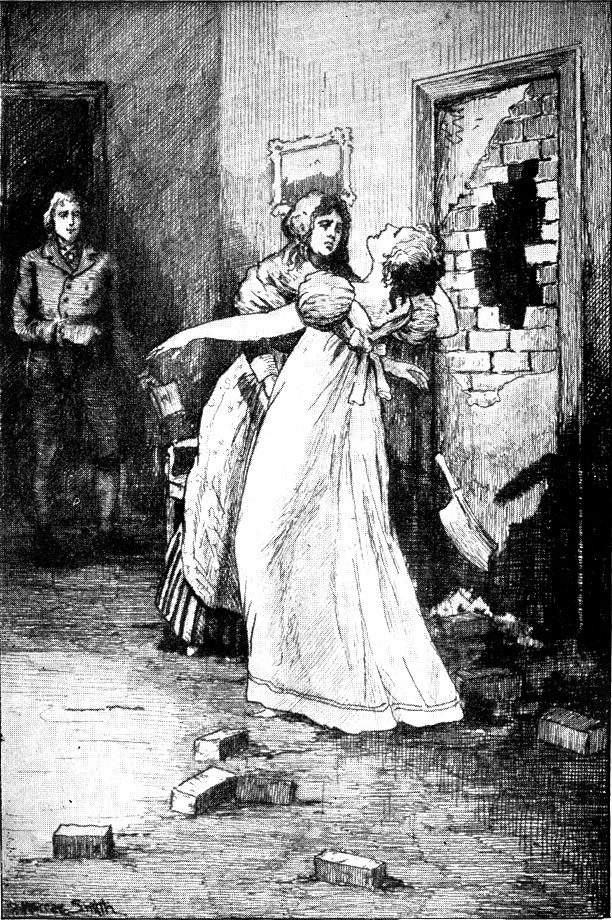
- Author: Honoré de Balzac
- Original title: La Paix du ménage
- Cover artist: David Murray Smith
- Language: French
- Series: La Comédie humaine
- Genre: Scènes de la vie privée
- Publisher: Mame et Delaunay-Vallée
- Publication date: 1830
- Publication place: France
- Preceded by: Une double famille
- Followed by: Madame Firmiani

La Paix du ménage (Domestic Bliss) is a French short story by Honoré de Balzac, which was first published by Mame et Delaunay-Vallée in 1830 as one of the author's Scènes de la vie privée (Scenes from Private Life). It was republished in 1842 as part of Furne's edition of Balzac's La Comédie humaine.

Dedicated to the author's dear niece, Valentine Surville, this vivid and incisive novella is constructed like a classical French play, observing the three unities of time (an hour), place (a ball) and subject (the seduction of a young woman). Contrary to what the title might lead one to expect, the work is not concerned with the married life of the French bourgeoisie; it is, rather, a scintillating depiction of high society under the First Empire.

== Plot ==
The Comte de Gondreville hosts an ostentatious ball in his stately mansion. Among the guests is an unknown woman in a blue dress. She is discreet and bashful, and clearly at odds with the arrogance and excitability of the other guests; it is as though she does not belong in these opulent surroundings. Intrigued by this pretty young woman, the Comte de Montcornet and Baron de la Roche-Hugon make a wager to see which of them can seduce this heavenly figure, who is, in fact, the wife of the Comte de Soulanges. A tangled web of amorous intrigues ensues.

== Theme ==
The dense structure of this novella resembles the stagecraft of a play. The masked ball also conjures up the theatre, where no one is quite what he or she seems.

== See also ==
- Repertory of the Comedie Humaine
