= La Vendetta (novel) =

1830 French novel by Honoré de Balzac

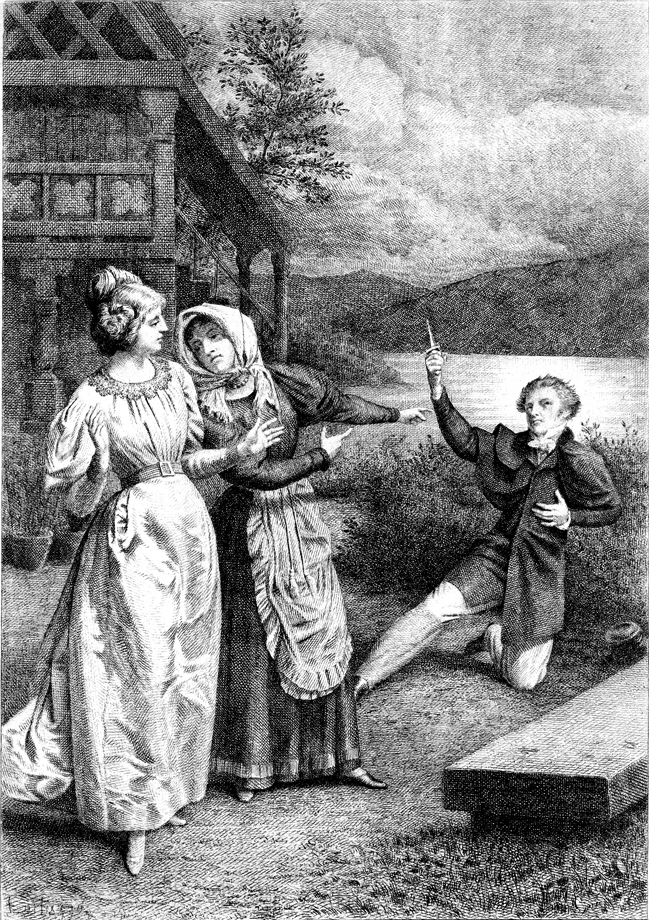
- Title page of 1897 edition of La Vendetta (illustration by Toudouze)
- Author: Honoré de Balzac
- Original title: La Vendetta
- Translator: Katharine Prescott Wormeley
- Illustrator: Édouard Toudouze
- Language: French
- Series: La Comédie humaine
- Genre: Scènes de la vie privée
- Publisher: Mame et Delaunay-Vallée
- Publication date: 1830
- Publication place: France
- Preceded by: Albert Savarus
- Followed by: Une double famille

La Vendetta (The Vendetta) is a novel by the French writer Honoré de Balzac. It is the eighth of the Scènes de la vie privée (Scenes of Private Life) in La Comédie humaine. The novel was first published in 1830 by Mame et Delaunay-Vallée. In 1842 it appeared in the first Furne edition of La Comédie humaine. La Vendetta was the fourth work in Volume 1, making it the fourth of the Scènes de la vie privée.

Balzac may have been inspired to write La Vendetta by Prosper Mérimée, whose novel Mateo Falcone, which was serialized by the Revue de Paris in 1829, also deals with the subject of Corsican vengeance and family honour.

== History ==
The manuscript of La Vendetta, which is preserved in the Lovenjoul Collection of the Institut de France in Paris, is in three separate parts: L'Atelier (The Artist's Workshop), La Désobéissance (The Act of Disobedience) and Le Mariage (The Marriage). The novel was completed in Paris in January 1830, when Balzac was assisting the Duchesse d'Abrantès with her Mémoires de l'Empire.

The first edition of La Vendetta was published in April 1830 by Mame et Delaunay-Vallée, appearing immediately after the preface in the first volume of a two-volume collection of Balzac's novels entitled Scènes de la vie privée – Balzac had not yet conceived of La Comédie humaine. The work was divided into a prologue and four sections entitled: L'Atelier, La Désobéissance, Le Mariage and Le Châtiment (The Punishment).

In May 1832 Mame-Delaunay brought out a second edition. By now the Scènes de la vie privée had grown to four volumes. La Vendetta retained its place immediately after the preface in the first volume.

In July 1835 Mme Béchet published a third edition of La Vendetta as part of a twelve-volume collection of Balzac's works entitled Etude de Moeurs au XIXe siècle (Studies of Manners in the 19th Century). In this edition La Vendetta was no longer divided into sections and was placed at the end of the first volume. Balzac altered the marriage scene for this edition.

In October 1839 Charpentier brought out a fourth edition of La Vendetta in a newly revised and corrected edition of the Scènes de la vie privée. La Vendetta was the first work in the second volume of the series.

In July 1842 a fifth edition of La Vendetta appeared in Furne's first publication of La Comédie humaine. La Vendetta was the fourth work in the first volume (Scènes de la vie privée) of this five-volume series.

== Plot ==
La Vendetta is a short work relating the tragic fate of Ginevra Piombo, the daughter of proud Corsican immigrants, who has the misfortune of falling in love with another Corsican Luigi Porta. When it becomes known that Luigi is the sole survivor of a massacre in which the rest of his family were the victims of a bloody vendetta with Ginevra's family, Ginevra's father Bartolomeo is determined to complete the act of vengeance by having him killed. But Ginevra refuses to yield to her father's demands and she and Luigi are married. Over the following years the pair eke out a miserable existence, dogged by hunger and poverty, while Ginevra's wealthy father refuses to lift a hand to support her: it is as much as he can do to refrain from murdering Luigi. Ginevra gives birth to a child, but she and the child die on the very day that Monsieur Piombo finally relents and decides to assist the impoverished couple. Before he can act, however, Luigi visits him and gives him the tresses of his deceased daughter. "Dead! Our two families were doomed to exterminate each other. Here is all that remains of her," he says, laying Ginevra's long black hair upon the table. Ginevra's parents are shaken, as though a stroke of lightning has blasted them. Luigi departs. "He has spared me a shot, for he is dead," says Bartolomeo, slowly, gazing on the ground at his feet.

== See also ==
- Repertory Of The Comedie Humaine
