= Ryan Brown (conductor) =

American classical conductor

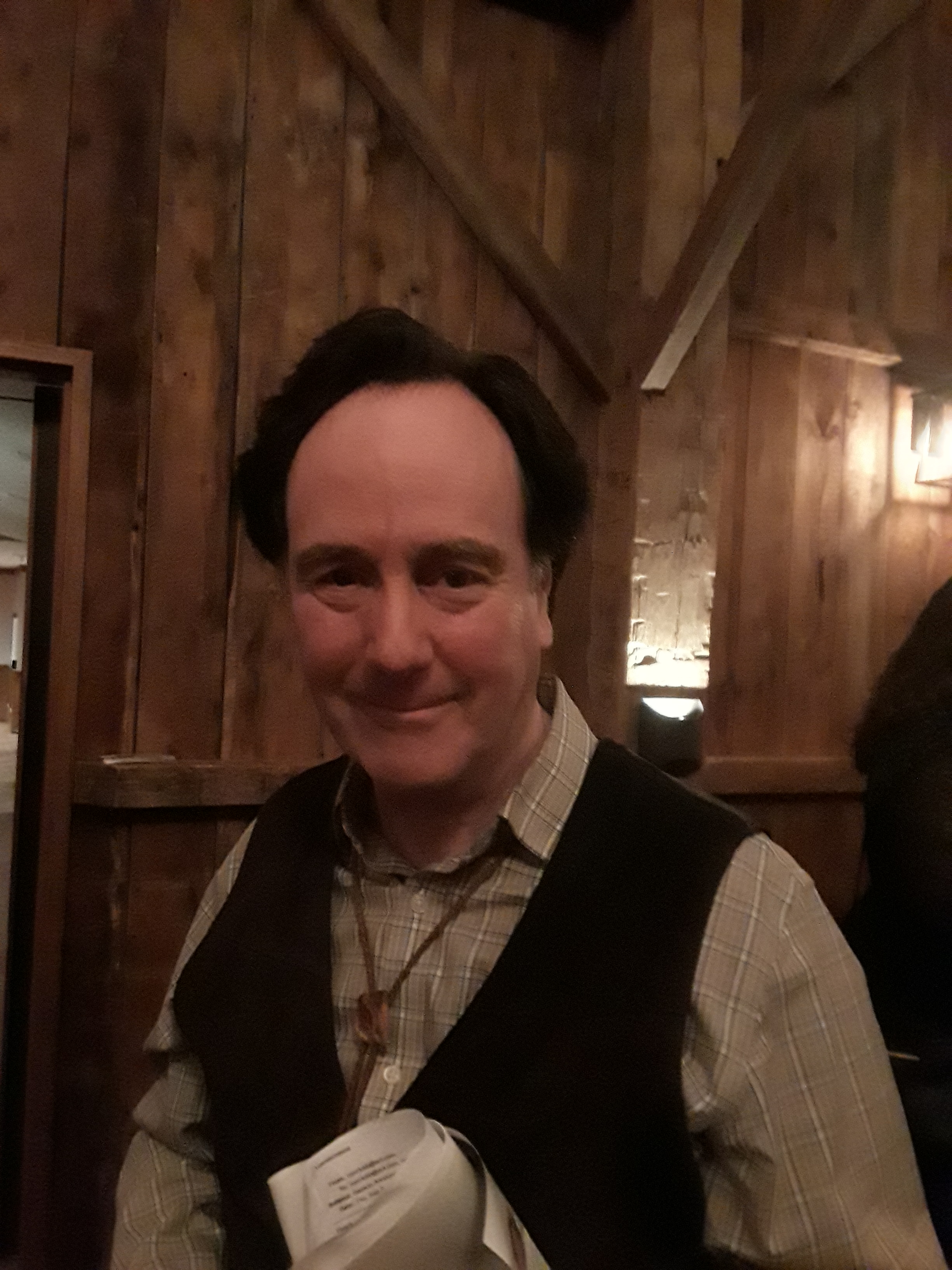
Ryan Brown at The Barns at Wolf Trap after conducting a performance of The Blacksmith by François-André Danican Philidor in September 2021

Ryan Brown (born 1958) is an American classical conductor.

== Biography and career ==
Ryan Brown was born into a musical family in California: his mother was a pianist, and his father was a pianist and conductor. He benefited from having a number of well-known musicians both staying and playing music in his home. He initially performed as a violinist and chamber musician before starting out as a conductor. He holds degrees from Oberlin, Cincinnati, and the Juilliard School, where he studied the violin under Dorothy DeLay. He studied conducting with Gustav Meier at the Peabody Institute in Baltimore.

In 1995, Brown founded Les Violons de Lafayette (which later changed its name to Opera Lafayette), and has been music director and conductor ever since. This group, dedicated to the performance of baroque and classical operas, notably French works, has performed at the Kennedy Center, in Washington, D. C., Lincoln Center, in New York, and many other venues. Brown and Opéra Lafayette have focused on French opera of the 18th century, performing works by Charpentier, Rameau, Gluck, Lully, and many others.

With Opéra Lafayette, Brown has recorded a number of CDs for the Naxos label, including works by Gluck, Lully, Monsigny, Rameau and Rebel.
