= Aline, reine de Golconde =

1766 opera in three acts by Pierre-Alexandre Monsigny

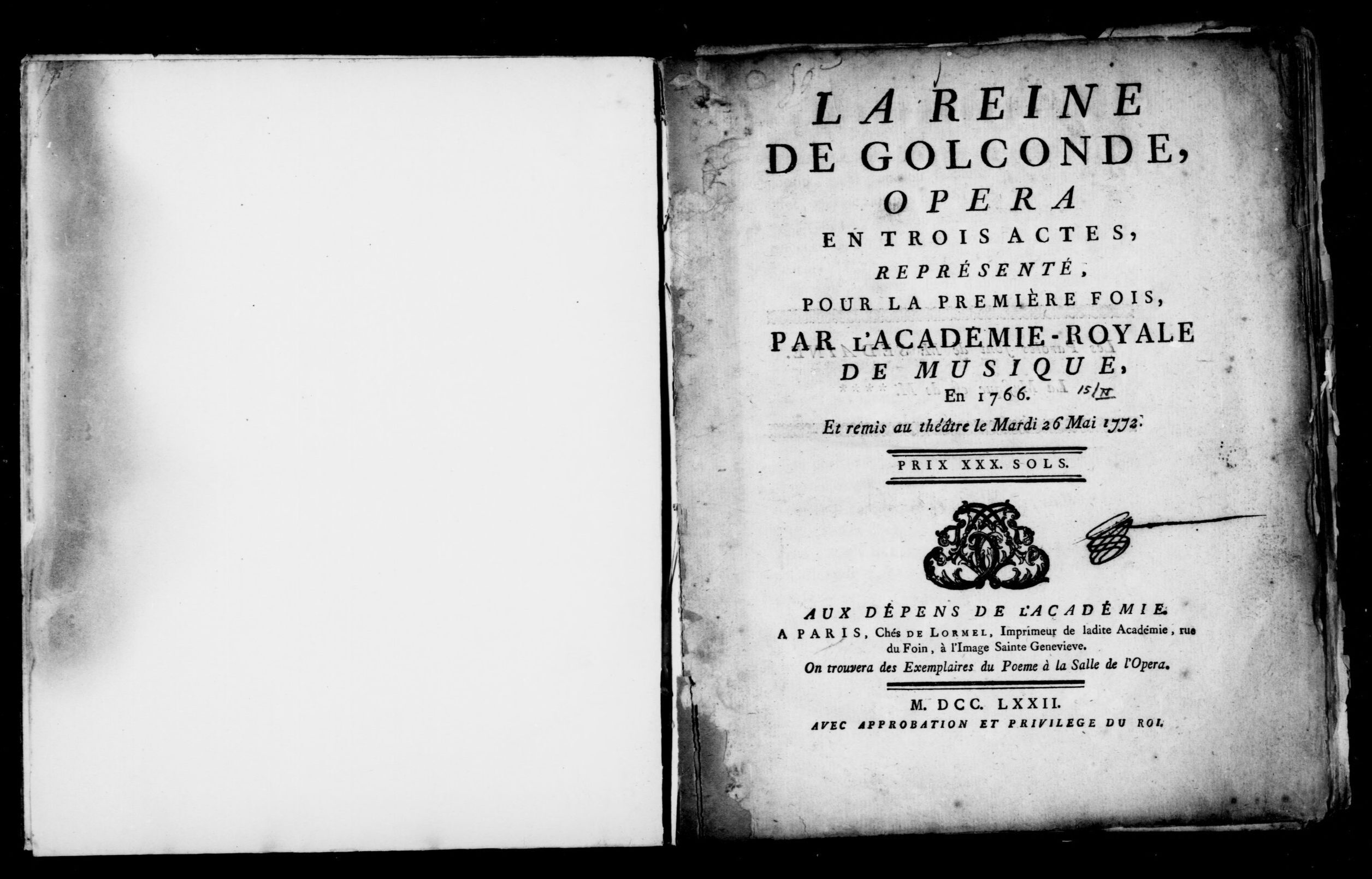
Frontispiece of ‘Aline, reine de Golconde’

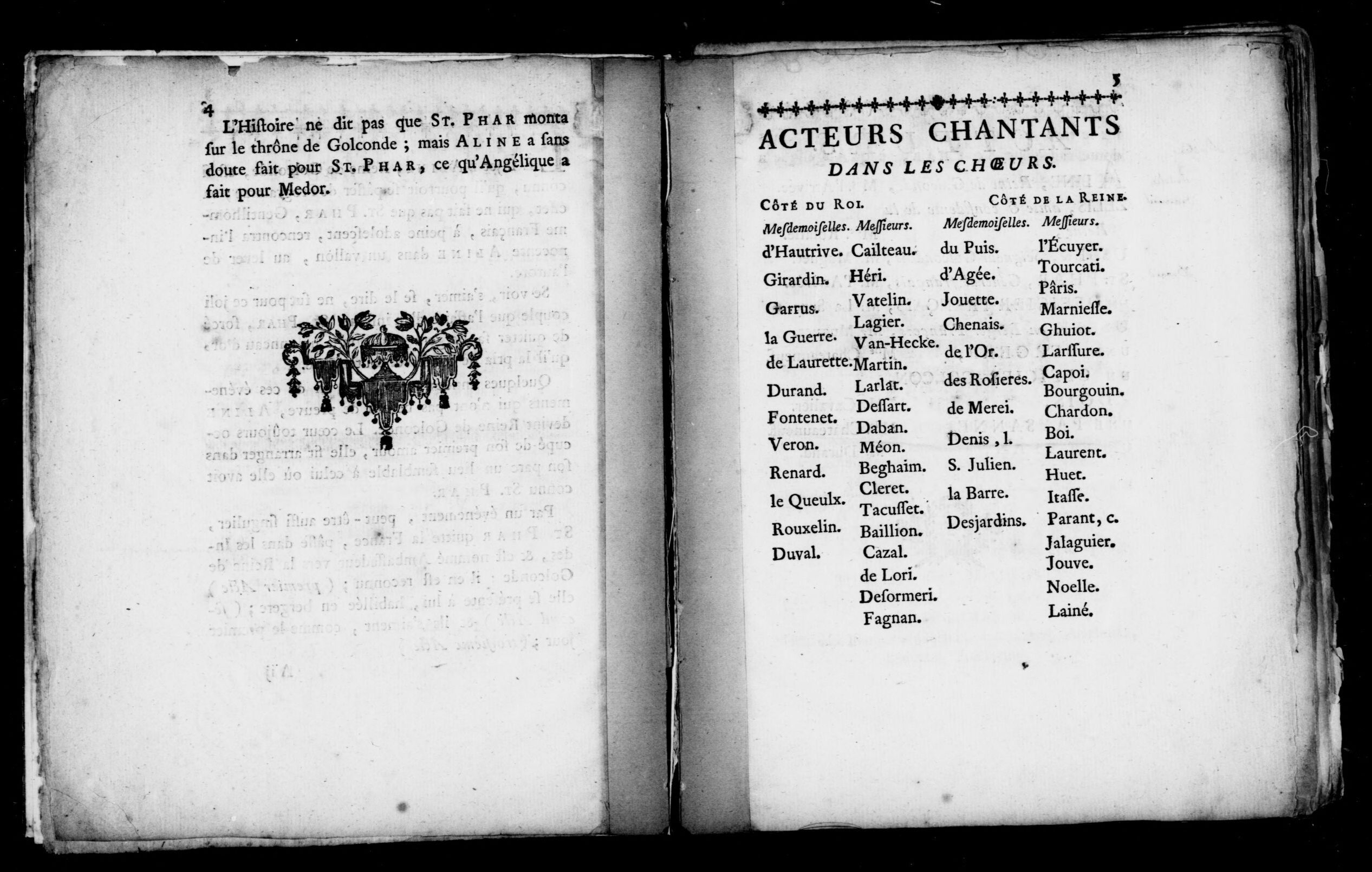
Original cast of ‘Aline, reine de Golconde’

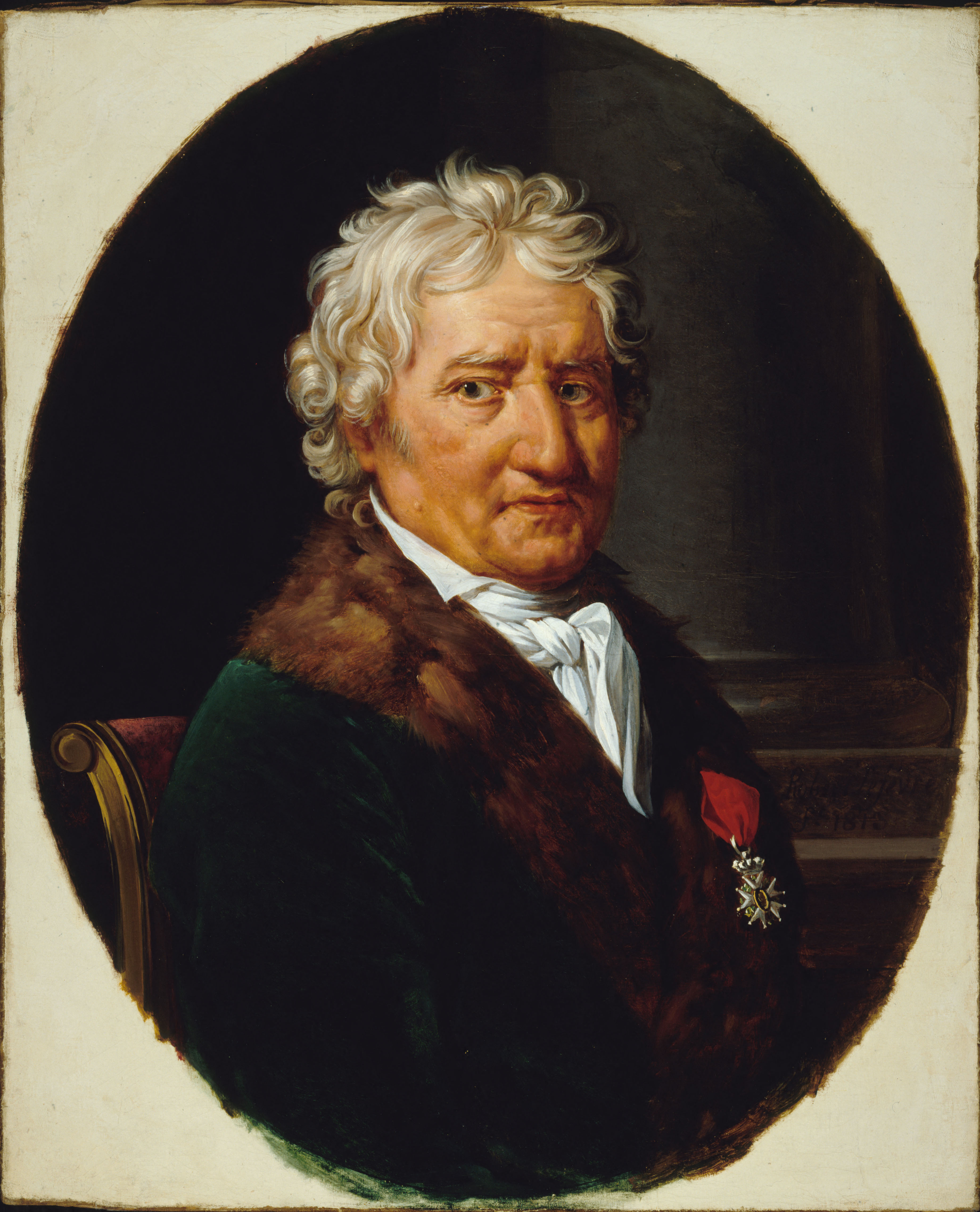
Pierre-Alexandre Monsigny

Aline, reine de Golconde (‘Aline, Queen of Golconda’) is an opera (ballet-héroïque) in three acts by Pierre-Alexandre Monsigny to a libretto by Michel-Jean Sedaine based on a story by Stanislas-Jean de Boufflers. It was first performed in the Salle des Machines in Paris on 15 April 1766.

== Action ==
The action takes place in India, where queen Aline recognises the newly arrived ambassador Saint Phar as her long lost lover from a time when she was a mere peasant girl. She disguises herself as a shepherdess and meets Saint Phar before leaving him again to test his love. Resuming her role as queen, she offers herself in marriage to Saint Phar, who declines because he loves the shepherdess. The true identity of the shepherdess is then revealed, and the lovers reunited.

== Reception ==
Although Monsigny had previously written light operas, Aline was his first and only grand opera. The Journal historique gave the work a damning review, saying that Sédaine's libretto lacked the gaiety of the original work and turned it into a dreary and trivial pastoral, while Montigny's music destroyed the prosody of the verse and merely enhanced its dullness.

Nevertheless, the work was popular and a revised version was staged in Paris in 1779. L'esprit des journaux, francais et etrangers commented that the first version had been updated in the light of changes to public taste and the styles made popular by Christoph Willibald Gluck. The music was full of pleasant tunes, but the recitatives, now all accompanied rather than “secco” as before, were too heavy for a pastoral and the public felt that the dances were too long.

Monsigny's later work Le déserteur (1769) was enormously popular and rapidly eclipsed Aline, which did not remain in the repertoire of the Opéra-Comique.

The opera was translated and performed in many European cities: Brussels (1774); Liège (1783); Berlin (German translation by FLW Meyer (de) 1782); London (Italian translation by A. Andrei, 1784); and Moscow (Russian translation, 1793). A parody appeared in 1768 under the title Nanine, Sœur de lait de la reine de Golconde.

== Later works ==
In 1787, Johann Abraham Peter Schulz composed new music to a translated version of the French libretto. In 1803 a different work with the same name premiered at the Opéra-Comique in Paris, with a libretto by Jean-Baptiste-Charles Vial and Etienne Guillaume François de Favières and music by Henri-Montan Berton. Gaetano Donizetti wrote his opera Alina, regina di Golconda on the same theme, using an Italian translation of the same libretto.
