= Louise Catherine Guéret =

French painter (1755–1851)

- Profile portrait of Louise Catherine Guéret, drawn by Henri-Pierre Danloux
- Born: 17 May 1755; Paris, France
- Died: 19 November 1851 (aged 96); Paris, France
- Relatives: Anne Guéret (sister)
- Patrons: Henri-Pierre Danloux; Jacques-Louis David

Louise Catherine Guéret (1755–1851), known as Mlle Guéret the Elder, was a French painter who was active at the end of the 18th century and the beginning of the 19th century. Louise Catherine and her sister Anne Guéret were orphaned as children but were adopted by the dramatist and librettist Michel-Jean Sedaine. He introduced them to the painters Henri-Pierre Danloux and Jacques-Louis David who gave them art lessons.

== Appearances at Salons ==
- 1798, by Citizens Guéret: no. 199, Two portraits, one of a Bust of a Woman, the other of Two Sisters, same number

== Portraits of Louise Catherine Guéret ==
- Henri-Pierre Danloux, Portrait de Louise Catherine Guéret, sketch
- Jacques-Louis David, (attributed to), Portrait presumed to be Catherine Guéret, Rouen, Musée des Beaux-Arts, carries David's signature
