= Pierre-René Lemonnier =

French playwright and librettist

Pierre-René Lemonnier (1731 in Paris – 8 January 1796 in Metz) was an 18th-century French playwright and librettist.

== Works ==
- 1760: Vaudeville des Pèlerins de la Courtille, (parodie des Paladins). N, -B. Duchesne, in-8.
- 1760: Le Maitre en droit, opéra comique in two acts (and in prose) mingled with ariettes, Duchesne, in-8°; or Paris, Christophe Ballard, 1762, in-8°.
- 1761: Le cadi dupé, opéra comique in one act (and in prose) mingled with ariettes. By the author of « Maitre en droit », Duchesne, in-8°.
- 1764: Les Dieux réunis, ou la Fête des Muses, prologue (in one act and in verse), and le Tuteur amoureux, comedy in two acts and in verse, mingled with ariettes (in French and in Spanish). Madrid, D. Antonio Munoz del Valle, in-4°.
- 1768: Le Mariage clandestin, comedy in three acts and in free verse, Amsterdam and Paris, Lejay, in-8.(Beuchot erroneously says in the Biographie universelle, that this play, imitated from English by Garrick, was not printed.)
- 1768: La Meunière de Gentilly, comedy in one act (in prose), mingled with ariettes. Vente, 1768, 1770, in-8°.
- 1773: L’Union de l’amour et des arts, ballet héroïque en trois entrées, composé des actes de Bathilde et Chloé, de Théodore et de la Cour d’amour (in free verse), Paris, Delormel, 1773, in-4 j or Paris, Bailard, in-8°.
- 1774: Azolan, ou le Serment indiscret, ballet héroïque in three acts (and in free verse), De Lormel, in-4. (the author reworked this play in 1787 under the titleAlmasis, but it was not printed then.)
- 1787: Renaud d’Ast, comedy in two acts and in prose, mingled with ariettes. Paris, Brunet, in-8°.
- 1794: La Matrone chinoise, ou l’Épreuve ridicule, comédie-ballet in two acts and in free verse, Claude Hérissant, in-8°.

== Sources ==
- Quérard, Joseph-Marie (1833). La France littéraire ou Dictionnaire bibliographique des savants, historiens et gens de lettres de la France: ainsi que des littérateurs étrangers qui ont écrit en français, plus particulièrement pendant les XVIIIe et XIXe (in French). Vol. 5. Firmin Didot. p. 149..
