= Une double famille =

A Second Home
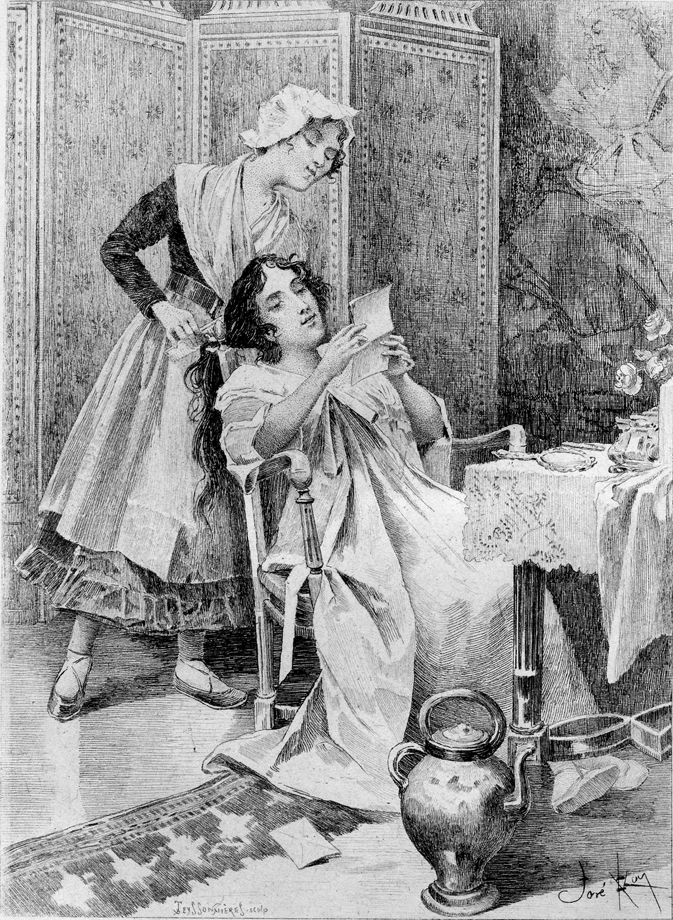
- Author: Honoré de Balzac
- Original title: Une double famille
- Translator: Clara Bell
- Cover artist: Édouard Toudouze
- Language: French
- Series: La Comédie humaine
- Genre: Scènes de la vie privée
- Publisher: Mame-Delaunay
- Publication date: 1830
- Publication place: France
- Preceded by: La Vendetta
- Followed by: La Paix du ménage

Une double famille (A Second Home) is a lengthy short story by Honoré de Balzac. The story first appeared in 1830 under the title La femme vertueuse (The Virtuous Woman). It was subsequently published in 1832 by Mame et Delaunay as part of Balzac's Scènes de la vie privée (Scenes from Private Life). In 1835, it appeared, in an edition by Madame Béchet, in the collection Études de mœurs (Studies of Manners). The novel only acquired its present title in 1842, when the fifth edition appeared in Volume I of the Scenes from Private Life, which was also the first volume of Balzac's La Comédie humaine.

The novel comprises two parts, two stories, which are really two sides of the same story. The plot revolves around an act of adultery - a double life, a second family - which is in some sense justified. From the beginning, the setting recalls the atmosphere of Balzac's Ferragus. In a squalid house, in a sordid neighbourhood, an old woman offers an angelic creature - her own daughter - to passers by. The Comte de Granville, unhappily married to a sanctimonious woman, falls in love with this grisette. An aristocrat and a magistrate of integrity, he had made a name for himself in the Gondreville affair, which Balzac would later recount in Une ténébreuse affaire (A Murky Affair).

In this work, the author protests against the excesses of bigotry and, according to a principle dear to him, he contrasts the interior design of an aristocratic house with both the grime of a squalid Parisian neighbourhood and the cheerful décor of a grisette's apartment (another familiar theme in the works of Balzac). Madame du Granville's home is, in his eyes: a place of cold, arid solemnity, of moral rectitude and narrow-mindedness. Whereas the grisette's flat, like that of La Torpille (Esther Van Gobseck), is a place of delights.

== Plot ==
Caroline Crochard, a young woman living with her mother in squalid conditions, is constantly sewing at the window to earn a meager income. Roger, comte de Granville, a young, rich man with an air of sadness, passes before the window every day. He sees the girl and the two fall in love over a period of several months. He is disgusted by Caroline's mother, whom he sees as a grasping, scheming old woman.

The story then sees Caroline richly installed as Madame de Bellefeuille in a luxurious apartment. She has two children with Roger. Caroline's mother dies, and on her deathbed a priest makes her confess the name of her daughter's benefactor.

Balzac then tells the story of the Comte de Granville's unhappy marriage. Angélique Bontemps is a childhood friend of Roger's, from an immensely wealthy and devoutly Catholic family in Bayeux. On the urging of his father, and bewitched by her beauty, Roger marries her eagerly. They move to Paris, where he has just been named to a prominent judicial role. He immerses himself in work, and thereby at first overlooks Angélique's monastic government of the household, but gradually he begins to chafe against the joyless environment she has created. However, the household remains peaceable, and the couple has several children together.

The crisis arrives when her childhood confessor, an ambitious priest of Jansenist sympathies, moves to Paris. Seeing Angélique, who is now highly placed within Parisian society, as a stepping stone to his own advancement, he works to gain control of her conscience, causing her to become more and more bigoted, and to openly renounce social functions necessary in the wife of a prominent lawyer. She stocks the household with devote friends and servants, and Roger begins to suffocate. She surreptitiously arranges with the servants to have him served fish in Lent so that he unknowingly fasts, which he sees as insubordinate behavior. However, being unable to fault his wife with anything concrete, he resorts to taking a mistress in Caroline, and stays away from Angélique as much as possible.

Fifteen years after their marriage, Angélique becomes aware through her confessor of Roger's double life, and goes to Caroline's home to confirm firsthand. She confronts Roger, who claims that she is incapable of love for him, as she is martyring his earthly happiness for her own salvation. He contrasts her with Caroline, who has eagerly sacrificed her salvation for him by becoming his mistress.

The story jumps forward several years. Roger is old and alone. He is staring up at a certain attic window, as he often does when walking home, to think about the possibilities that could be unfolding behind the curtain. A doctor acquaintance of his, who happens to live in the building, recognizes him, and they talk. Roger tells his acquaintance that all human feeling is extinct within his heart. In order to reawaken some feeling within him, the doctor tells him the story that is taking place in the attic. A beautiful woman, who lives there with her two children, is in love with a debauched young man, who has squandered her fortune and for whose pleasure she sacrifices food and clothes for herself and her sons. She sells her hair, and he takes the money from this as well. Roger declares that her lot is better than his, as she is able to love.

This woman is revealed to be Caroline, who has left the Comte de Granville and taken up with a young gambler. Roger is pitiless, and does nothing to try to aid her in her poverty. However, when one of his legitimate sons, Eugène, comes to him saying a young man claiming to be his son has committed a burglary, he confesses the truth and gives a large sum of money to Eugène, saying that he trusts him to do what he thinks right, and that he will be retiring to Italy. The story closes with a speech from Roger to his son on the importance of appraising a woman's character before marrying her.

== Commentary ==
The author of La Comédie humaine once again employs the technique of the retrospective illumination when in Une ténébreuse affaire, which Balzac began to write in 1839, we are given a glimpse of the professional and political side of Granville's life - the upright magistrate, who reappears in Splendeurs et misères des courtisanes (Scenes from a Courtesan's Life) of 1838.

== Criticism ==
This story can be considered a minor work of Balzac, who is not particularly known for his achievements in the genre of melodrama. His talent as a portraitist, however, shines through in the character of Caroline, a talent he displayed and refined throughout the writing of La Comédie humaine.

== See also ==
- Repertory of the Comedie Humaine
