= Zélindor, roi des Sylphes =

Zélindor, roi des Sylphes (English: Zélindor, king of the Sylphs) is an opera-ballet, a divertissement in one act, created at Versailles in 1745 by François Rebel to a libretto by François-Augustin Paradis de Moncrif. In March 1753 the ballet was revived and was the last significant success of Madame de Pompadour's troupe, the Théâtre des Petits Cabinets.

== Roles ==
- Zyrphée - soprano
- Zélindor - tenor
- Zulim - bass
- la nymphe - soprano

== Recordings ==
- orchestra Ausonia, dir. Frédérick Haas and Mira Glodeanu; in 20-CD box set 200 ans de Musique à Versailles Codaex (2007)
- with Le Trophée by François Francoeur. Opera Lafayette cond. Ryan Brown, Naxos (2009)
