= Christelle Guéret =

French computer scientist and operations researcher

Christelle Jussien-Guéret is a French computer scientist and operations researcher specializing in the vehicle routing problem. She is a professor at the University of Angers, affiliated with the Laboratoire Angevin de Recherche en Ingénierie des Systèmes (LARIS).

== Education and career ==
Guéret has a Ph.D. from the University of Technology of Compiègne, completed in 1997. Her dissertation, Problèmes d'ordonnancement sans contraintes de précédence [Scheduling problems without precedence constraints] concerned open-shop scheduling and was directed by Jacques Carlier. She defended a habilitation in 2004 at the University of Nantes.

She worked at the École des Mines de Nantes from 1997 until 2012, when she moved to her present position at the University of Angers.

== Book ==
Guéret is the coauthor of a book on the FICO Xpress system for optimization, Applications of Optimization with Xpress-MP.
