= La belle Arsène =

French Opera By Pierre-Alexandre Monsigny

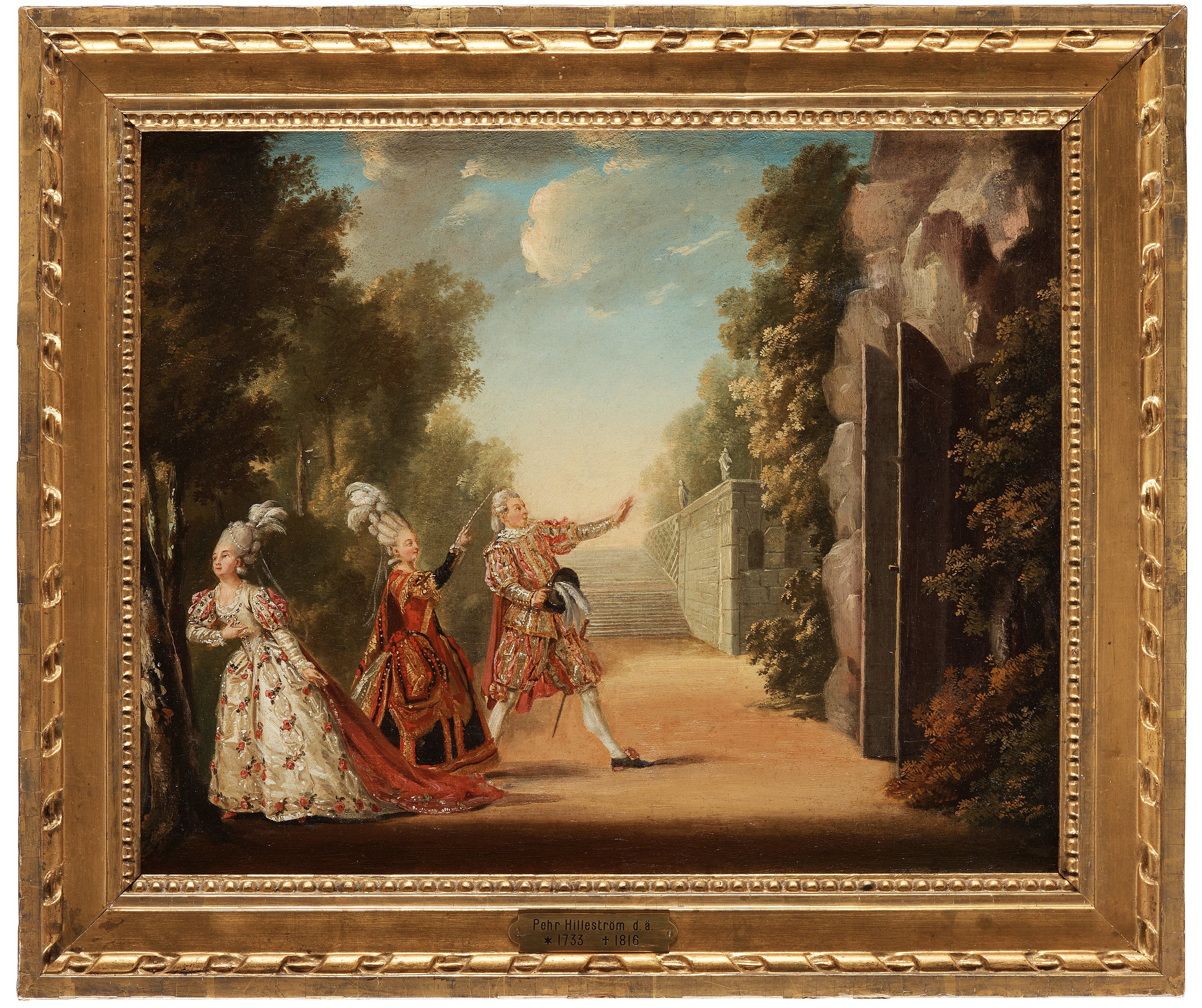
Painting by Pehr Hilleström which shows act III, scene VIII from the Opera. Performed in Stockholm in 1779.

La belle Arsène (1773) is a French opéra comique by Pierre-Alexandre Monsigny to a libretto by Charles-Simon Favart. The opera was first performed on 6 November 1773 in three acts by the Comédiens Italiens ordinaires du Roi before Louis XV at the Palace of Fontainebleau. This version was published in 1773 as comédie-féerie en trois actes, mêlée d'ariettes. A revised version in 4 acts was presented on 14 August 1775 by the same company at their theatre in Paris, the Hôtel de Bourgogne. From the 1776 edition onwards it is always described as "in four acts."

The opera was the first to have excerpts sung in the air - thanks to Élisabeth Thible, the first woman aeronaut, who, dressed as Minerva, sang arias from the opera, impromptu, to an audience below her including Gustav III, from a Montgolfier balloon in 1784.
