= Anne Guéret =

French painter (1760–1805)

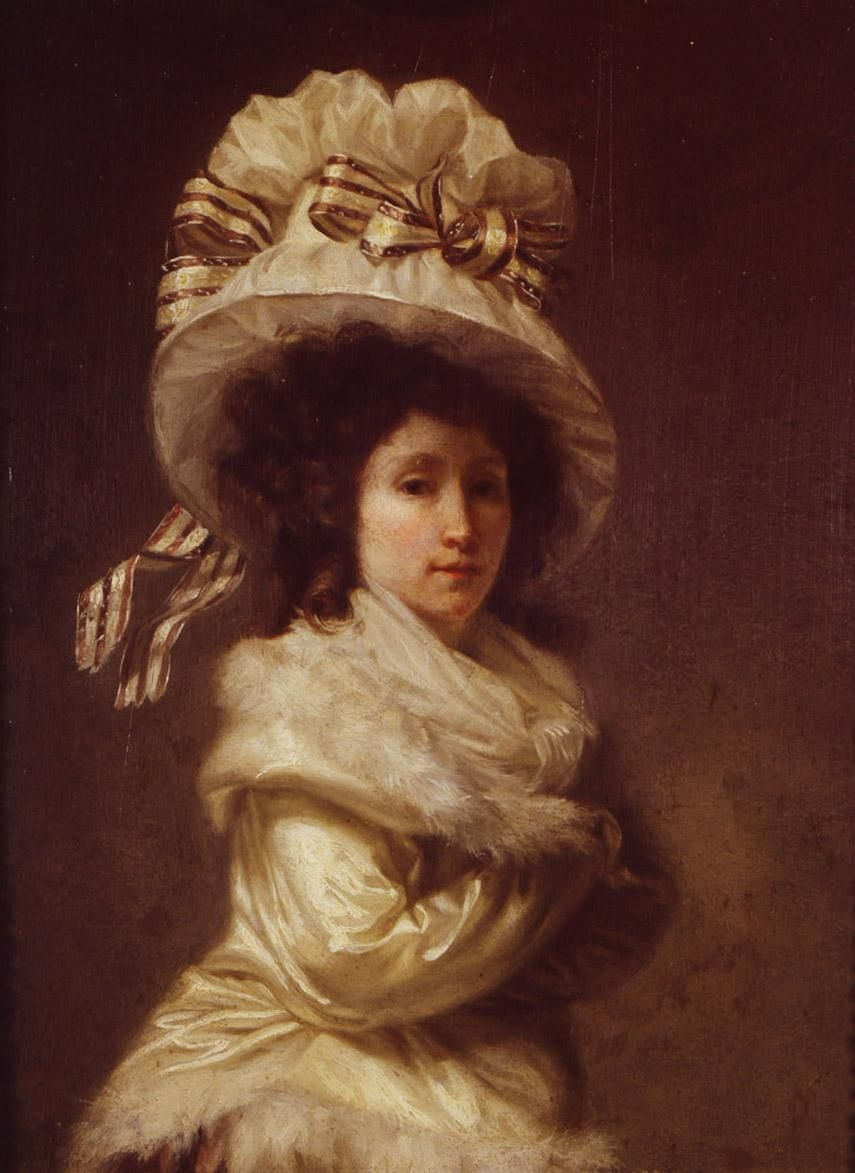
- Portrait of Madame Bernier, née Anne Guéret (1760–1805), by Henri-Pierre Danloux
- Born: 9 May 1760; Paris, France
- Died: 24 November 1805 (aged 45)
- Spouse: Charles-Louis Bernier
- Relatives: Louise Catherine Guéret (sister)
- Patrons: Henri-Pierre Danloux; Jacques-Louis David

Anne Guéret (9 May 1760 – 24 November 1805), known as Mlle Guéret the Younger, was a French painter who was active at the end of the 18th century and the beginning of the 19th century. Anne and her sister Louise Catherine Guéret were orphaned as children but were adopted by the dramatist and librettist Michel-Jean Sedaine. He introduced them to the painters Henri-Pierre Danloux and Jacques-Louis David who gave them art lessons. In 1793 Anne made her Salon debut. She continued to exhibit in Salons until 1801 presenting mainly portraits.

After Anne Guéret married the architect Charles-Louis Bernier, Danloux painted a small portrait of her. Roger Portalis, French engraver and art critic, claims that Danloux always kept an image of her with him.

== Appearances at Salons ==
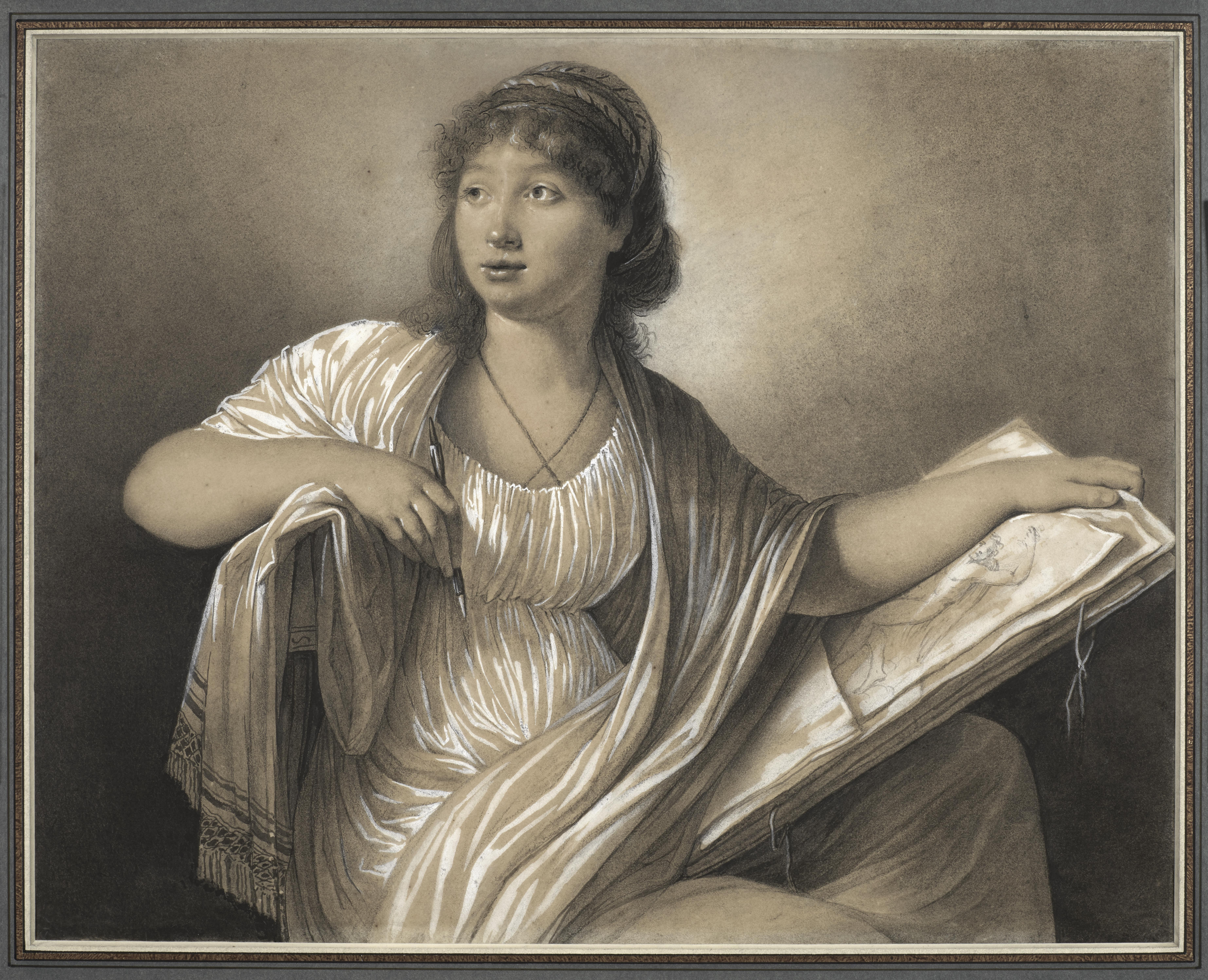
Portrait of an Artist Leaning on a Portfolio, by Anne Guéret, Salon of 1793, probably a self-portrait

Anne Guéret is designated in the Salon booklet as The Younger. She was domiciled in Paris in 1793 at 109, rue de la Vannerie and in 1798 at 109, rue de la Verrerie.

- 1793:
  - no. 115, Four portraits, under the same number
  - no. 474, Portrait of Citizen Sedaine the Younger
  - no. 605, A Woman on a Sofa
  - no. 765, Portrait of an Artist Leaning on a Portfolio
  - no. 766, Portrait of a Citizen Making Music
- 1795:
  - no. 232, Two paintings, one A Bacchante and the other A Vestal Virgin (belongs to the Société des amis des arts)
  - no 233, Two Women in the Same Painting
- 1798, by Citizens Guéret: no. 199, Two portraits, one of a Bust of a Woman, the other of Two Sisters, same number
- 1801: Portrait of a Woman with Two Children

== Artwork at a public sale ==
Portrait of an Artist Leaning on a Portfolio was exhibited by Anne Guéret at the Salon of 1793, and it is now in a private collection in France. It was done with black chalk, with stumping, with pen and grey ink and grey wash, extensively heightened with white gouache on buff paper. 320 x 404 mm. (12 5/8 x 15 7/8 in.)
