= Michel-Jean Sedaine =

French dramatist and librettist

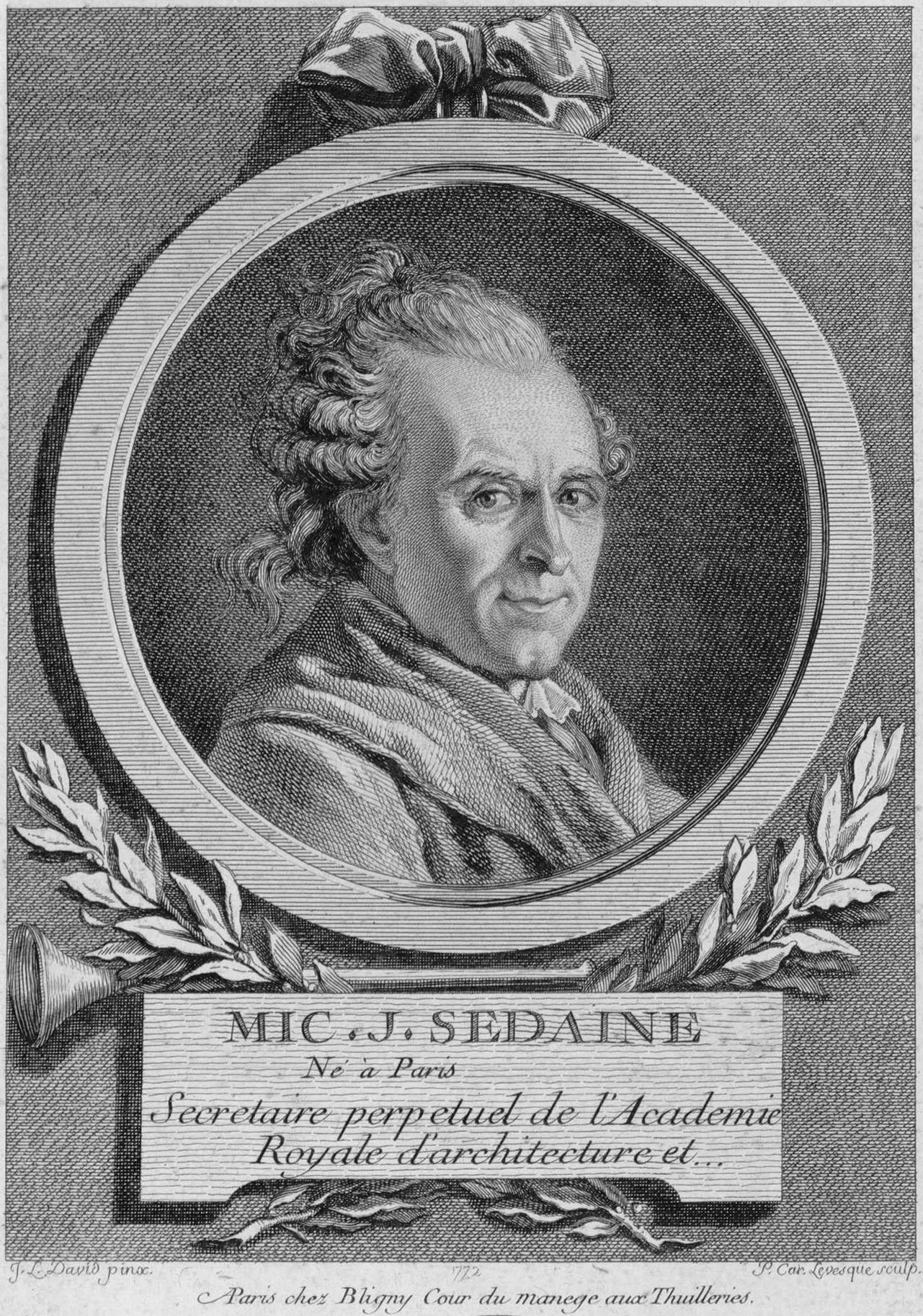
Michel-Jean Sedaine, engraving by Pierre-Charles Lévesque after the portrait by David.

Michel-Jean Sedaine (2 June 1719 – 17 May 1797) was a French dramatist and librettist, especially noted for his librettos for opéras comiques, in which he took an important and influential role in the advancement of the genre from the period of Charles-Simon Favart to the beginning of the Revolution.

== Early life ==
Sedaine was born in Paris. His father, an architect, died when Sedaine was quite young and left no fortune to inherit, the young Sedaine therefore began life as a mason's labourer. He was at last taken as pupil by an architect whose kindness he eventually repaid, by the help he was able to give to his benefactor's grandson, the painter David. Meanwhile, he had done his best to repair his deficiencies of education, and in 1750 he published a Recueil de pièces fugitives, which included fables, songs and pastorals.

== Writer of opéras comiques ==
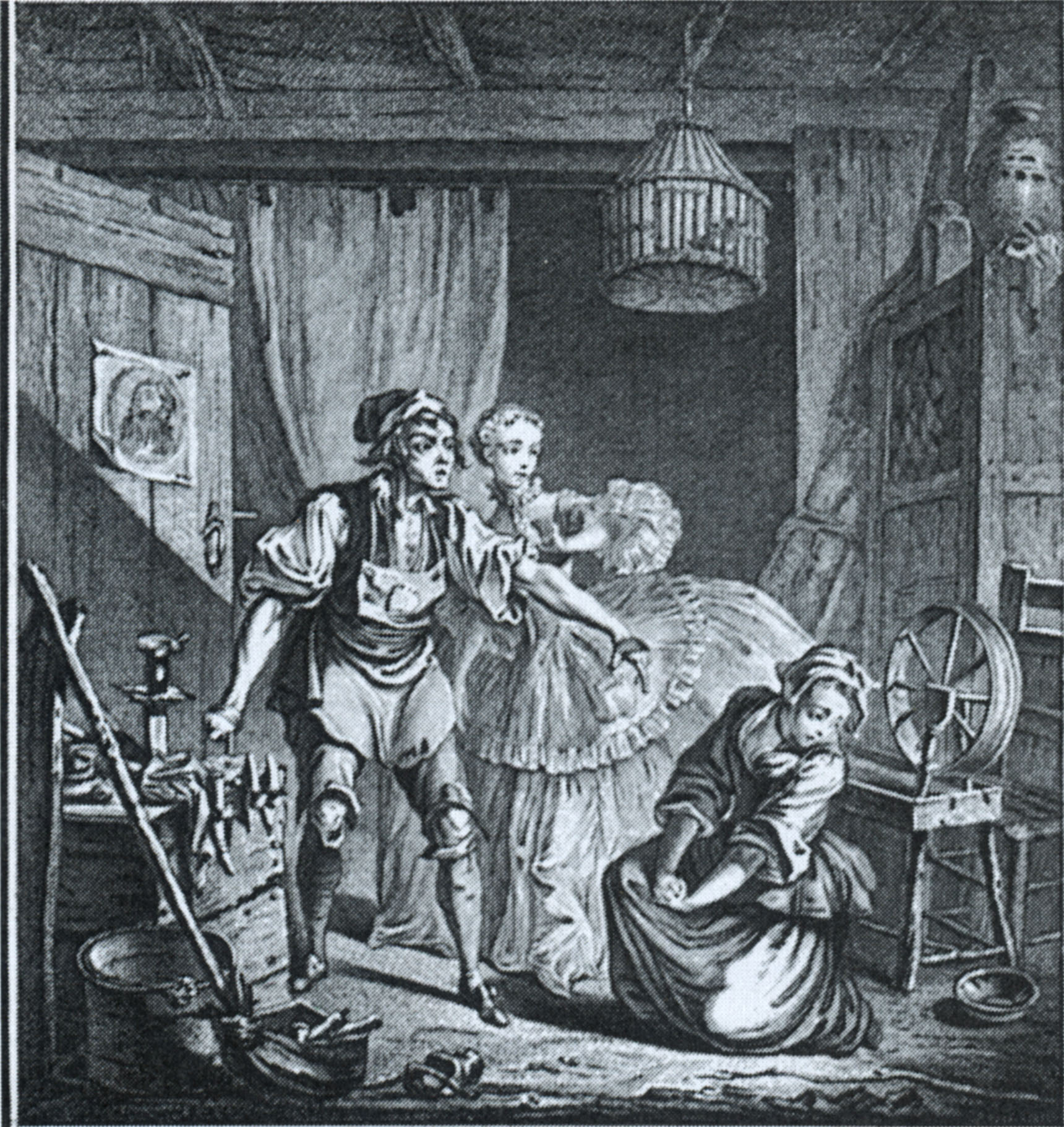
A scene from Le diable à quatre

Sedaine's especial talent was, however, for light opera. He wrote Le diable à quatre, set mainly to vaudevilles with additional music by Philidor, Laruette and Baurans. First performed at the Foire Saint-Laurent on 19 August 1756, it was produced numerous times with music by different composers and became one of the most performed comic operas in the latter half of the 18th century.

Other such works followed, including Blaise le savetier (1759) with music of Philidor; On ne s'avise jamais de tout (1761) Aline, reine de Golconde and others with Pierre-Alexandre Monsigny; Aucassin et Nicolette (1780), Richard Coeur-de-lion (1784), and Amphitryon (1788) with André Grétry.

Among his more important works in the genre were two set by Monsigny: Le roi et le fermier (1762), notable for its portrayal of royal recognition of common justice and its 3-act length, and Le déserteur (1769), which included a through-composed finale with chorus.

== Work as a dramatist ==
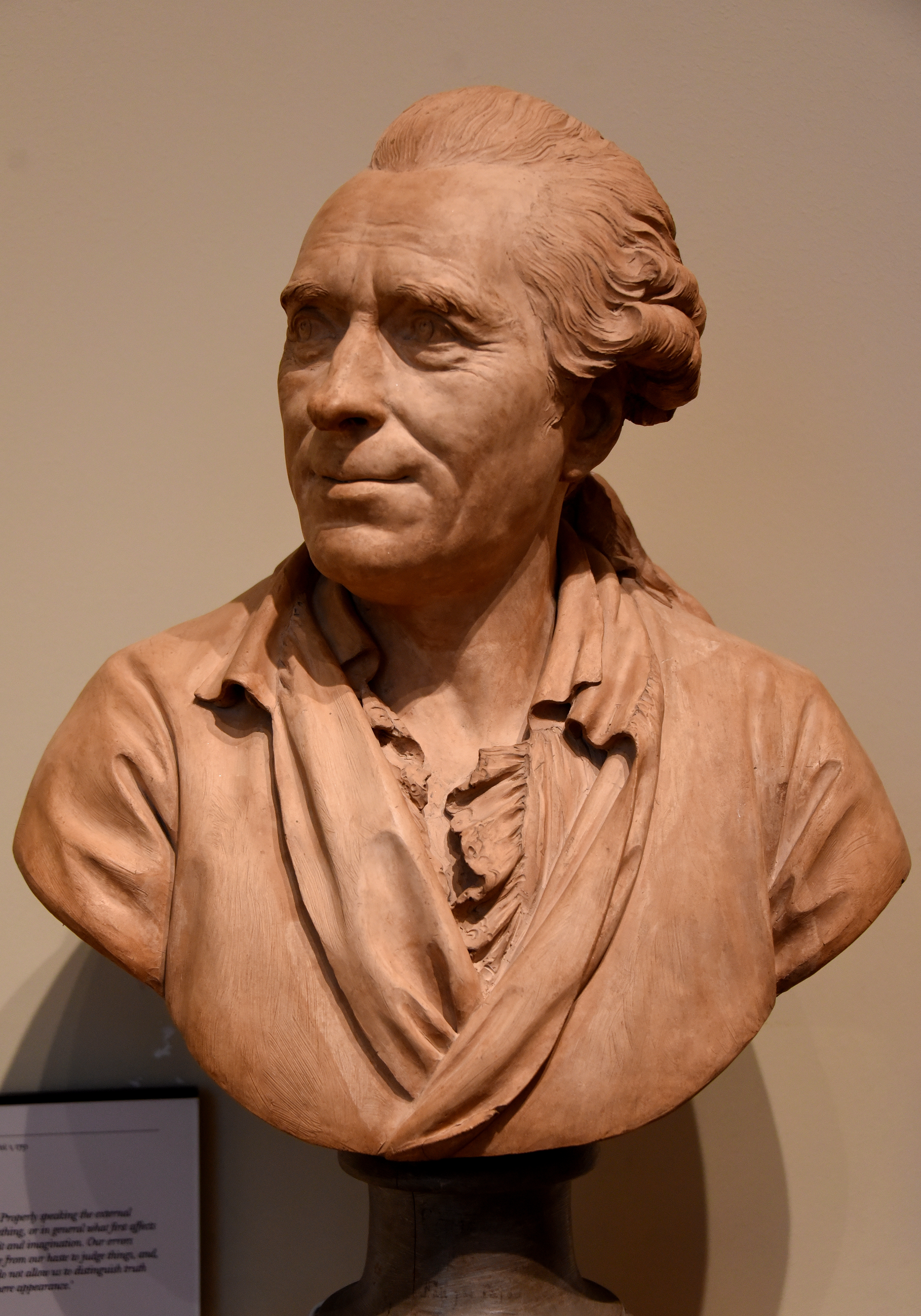
Bust of Michel-Jean Sedaine, 1775 CE. From Paris, France. By Augustin Pajou. The Victoria and Albert Museum, London

Sedaine's work in opéra comique attracted the attention of Diderot, and two plays of his were accepted and performed at the Théâtre Français. The first and longest, the Philosophe sans le savoir, was acted in 1765; the second, a lively one-act piece, La gageure imprévue in 1768. These two at once took their place as stock pieces and are still ranked among the best French plays, each of its class. Except these two pieces little or nothing of his has kept the stage.

He wrote two historical dramas, Raymond V, comte de Toulouse ou L'épreuve inutile, and Maillard, ou Paris sauvé.

Sedaine became a member of the Academy (1786), and secretary for architecture of the fine arts division.

== Personal life ==
Anne Guéret and her sister Louise Catherine Guéret were orphaned as children but were adopted by Sedaine. He died in Paris in 1797.

== Legacy ==
Sedaine may be regarded as the literary ancestor of Scribe and Dumas. He had the practical knowledge of the theatre, which enabled him to carry out the ideas of Diderot and give him claims to be regarded as the real founder of the domestic drama in France.

His Œuvres (1826) contain a notice of his life by Ducis.
