= Pierre-Alexandre Monsigny =

French composer

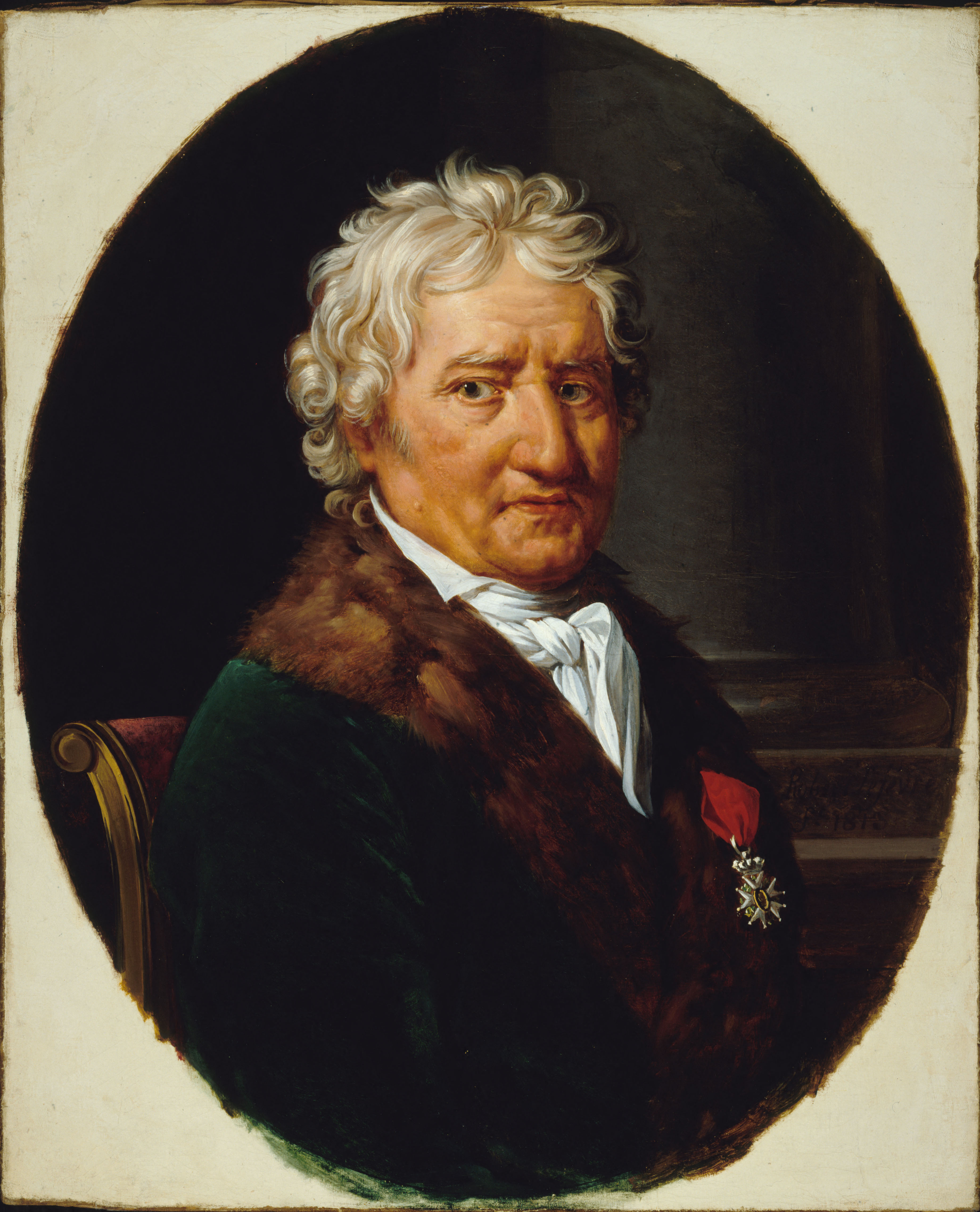
Pierre-Alexandre Monsigny

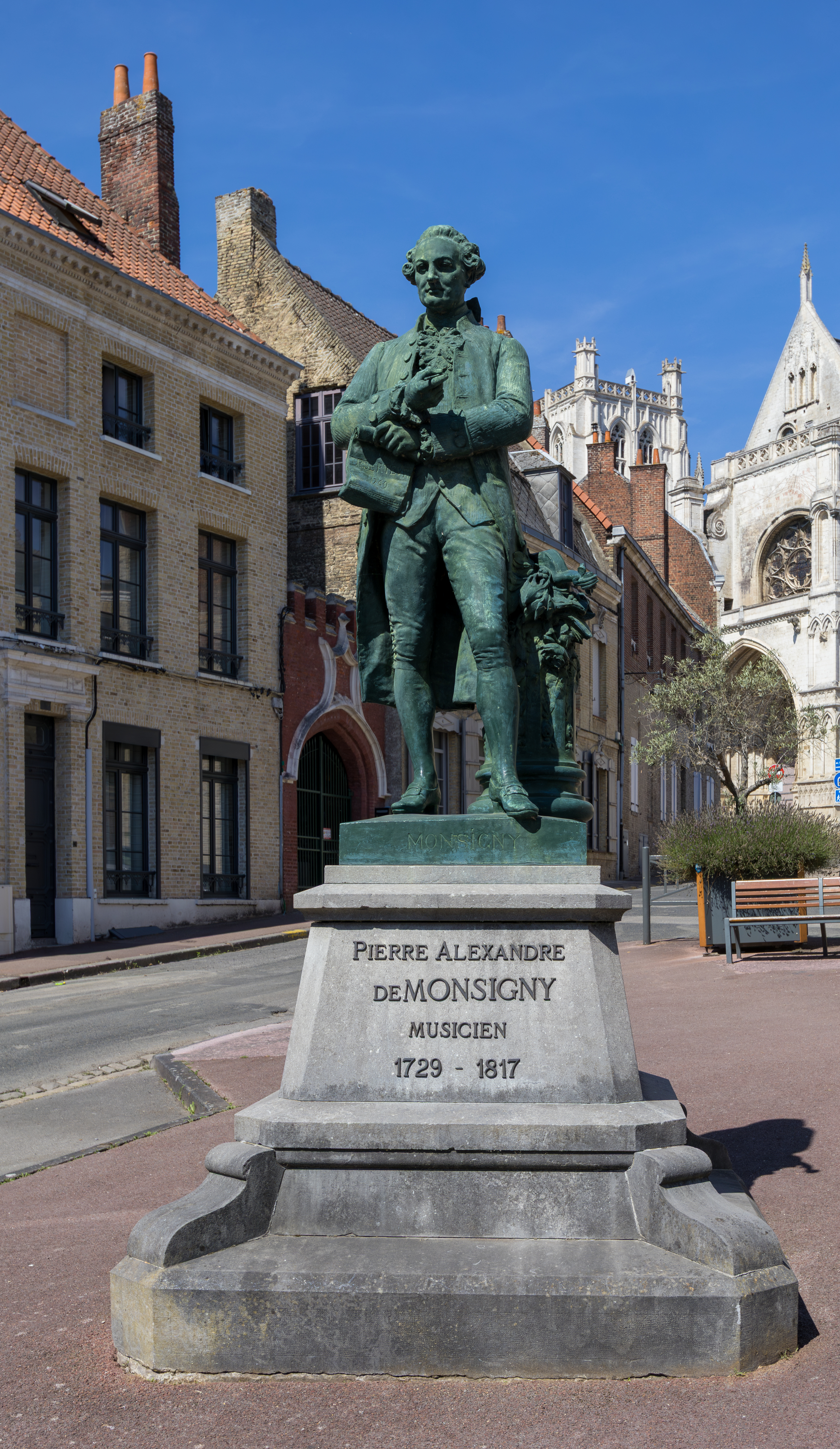
Statue in Saint-Omer.

Pierre-Alexandre Monsigny (French pronunciation: [pjɛʁ alɛksɑ̃dʁ mɔ̃siɲi]; 17 October 1729 – 14 January 1817) was a French composer and a member of the French Académie des Beaux-Arts (1813).

He is considered alongside André Grétry and François-André Danican Philidor to have been the founder of a new musical genre, the opéra comique, laying a path for other French composers such as François-Adrien Boieldieu, Daniel-François-Esprit Auber, Charles Gounod, Georges Bizet, and Jules Massenet in this genre.

== Biography ==
Pierre-Alexandre Monsigny was born at Fauquembergues, near Saint-Omer, in the former Artois region of France (now Pas-de-Calais), four months before the marriage of his parents, Marie-Antoinette Dufresne and Nicolas Monsigny.

He was educated at the Walloon Collége des Jésuites in Saint-Omer. It was here that he first discovered his aptitude for music.

As the eldest child, in 1749, a few months after his father's death, he left for Paris with only a few coins in his pocket, a violin and a recommendation letter, in an attempt to further his musical career and provide for his siblings. He entered into the service of the connoisseur of art and the theater, Louis Guillaume Baillet de Saint-Julien, in the bureau of the Comptabilité du Clergé de France. In 1752, after watching a performance of La serva padrona by Giovanni Battista Pergolesi at the Paris Opera, he decided upon his true vocation. He then became Pietro Gianotti's student, and a contra-bassist at the Paris Opéra.

Secretly, with a text by La Ribardière, he wrote Les aveux indiscrets, his first comic opera, which premiered at the theater of the Foire St Germain in February 1759. This work was well received, and that encouraged him to compose a second opera, in two acts, on a libretto by Pierre-René Lemonnier. Le maître en droit, the following year, received the same positive public response. Michel-Jean Sedaine, a well-liked librettist, proposed to Monsigny a collaboration, following Le cadi dupé's success. Their common production was excellent: On ne s'avise jamais de tout, Le roi et le fermier and Rose et Colas. On 15 April 1766, at the Académie royale de Musique, his epic ballet in three acts Aline, reine de Golconde was not as successful as expected. The critics were harsher two years later, with L'île sonnante. The music, it is true, preserves its usual grace of Monsigny's touch. However, Charles Collé's libretto happened to be ill-adapted to the stage and justified the work's lack of success.

It is during this same year of 1768 that the composer purchased the post of maître d'hôtel in the service of the great courtier Louis Philippe I, Duke of Orléans. A place in the entourage of this patron proved favorable to Monsigny's inspiration. Michel-Jean Sedaine submitted his libretto, Le déserteur, for which he composed his most successful score. Yet Le faucon, created in 1771 was a failure. On 17 August 1775, La belle Arsène caused controversy among critics.

In 1777, following the success of Félix, ou L'enfant trouvé, Monsigny stopped composing. At the beginning of 1784, he married Amélie de Villemagne, with whom he lived peacefully until 1789. The French Revolution and The Terror deprived them of all their material existence. The musician and his family sank into deep misery and oblivion for a few years. Hearing of the composer's state of poverty, the members of the Opéra-Comique gave him a pension of 2400 pounds, in order to prove their gratitude to one of the founders of their theater.

The years of adversity came to an end and Monsigny reached once again his deserved success. He became inspector of teaching at the Conservatoire de Musique de Paris. In 1804, he received the title of Chevalier de la Légion d'honneur. In 1813, he succeeded Grétry at the institute. He was totally blind during his last years. Monsigny died in Paris.

== Works ==
See List of operas by Pierre-Alexandre Monsigny.

== Bibliography ==
- Bruce Alan Brown: Gluck and the French Theatre in Vienna (Oxford, 1991)
- A. E. M. Grétry: Mémoires, ou Essais sur la musique (Paris, 1789, 2/1797)
- Daniel Heartz: "The Beginnings of Operatic Romance: Rousseau, Sedaine, and Monsigny", Eighteenth Century Studies, xv (1981–2), 149–78
- Raphaëlle Legrand: "L'opéra comique de Sedaine et Monsigny", Michel Sedaine (1719–1797): Theatre, Opera and Art, ed. D. Charlton and M. Ledbury (Aldershot, forthcoming)
- P. J. B. Nougaret: De l'art du théâtre (Paris, 1769)
- Karin Pendle: "L'opéra-comique à Paris de 1762 à 1789", L'opéra-comique en France au XVIIIe siècle, ed. P. Vendrix (Liège,1992), 79–178
- Arthur Pougin: Monsigny et son temps (Paris, 1908). Copy at the Internet Archive. Copy at Google Books.
