= Montgaillard =

== Places ==
Montgaillard is the name or part of the name of several communes in France:

- Mongaillard, former commune of the Gers, now part of Cazaux-d'Anglès
- Montgailhard, formerly Montgaillard, in the Ariège department
- Montgaillard, Aude, in the Aude department
- Montgaillard, Landes, in the Landes department
- Montgaillard, Hautes-Pyrénées, in the Hautes-Pyrénées department
- Montgaillard, Tarn, in the Tarn department
- Montgaillard, Tarn-et-Garonne, in the Tarn-et-Garonne department
- Montgaillard-de-Salies, in the Haute-Garonne department
- Montgaillard-en-Albret, in the Lot-et-Garonne department
- Montgaillard-Lauragais, in the Haute-Garonne department
- Montgaillard-sur-Save, in the Haute-Garonne department

== People ==
- Jean Gabriel Maurice Rocques, comte de Montgaillard, (November 16, 1761 – February 8, 1841) was a French political agent of the Revolution and First Empire era.
