= Antoinette Saint-Huberty =

French operatic soprano

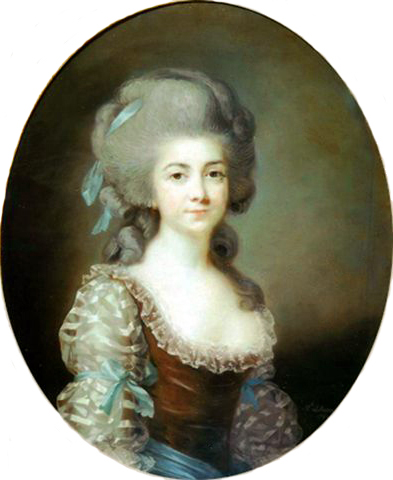
- Pastel portrait of Saint-Huberty by Élisabeth Vigée Le Brun, c. 1780
- Born: Anne-Antoinette Clavel; 15 December 1756; Strasbourg, Kingdom of France
- Died: 22 July 1812 (aged 55); Barnes, Surrey
- Other names: Mademoiselle Saint-Huberty; Madame (de) Saint-Huberty (or, alternatively, Saint-Huberti); Comtesse d'Antraigues
- Occupation: Opera singer (soprano)
- Years active: c. 1774–1790

Anne-Antoinette-Cécile Clavel, better known by her stage name Madame Saint-Huberty or Saint-Huberti (15 December 1756 in Strasbourg – 22 July 1812 in Barnes, London), was a celebrated French operatic soprano whose career extended from c. 1774 until 1790. After her retirement from the stage and the publicising of her second marriage, she was also known as the Comtesse d'Antraigues from around 1797. She and her husband were murdered in England.

== Early life and musical career ==
Antoinette Clavel (later known professionally as Madame Saint-Huberty) was the daughter of Jean-Pierre Clavel, a musician employed as a répétiteur in the private opera troupe of Charles IV Theodore, Elector Palatine. Her mother was Claude-Antoinette Pariset, the daughter of a grocer from Sélestat.

Her biographers have often disagreed about her place of birth. Renwick, for example, found instances of it being indicated as Toul, Thionville, or Mannheim, and Clayton gives it as Toulouse – presumably after having interpreted "Toul" as an abbreviation. However, after discovering her baptismal certificate in the Archives nationales, de Goncourt established that she was born in Strasbourg, where she was baptized Anne-Antoinette (or Anna-Antonia on the certificate) at the church of Saint-Pierre-le-Jeune on the day after her birth. There is no mention of the name "Cécile" on her baptismal certificate, and de Goncourt suggests that she adopted this name only in later life. Dorlan traced her birthplace to 131 Grand'rue (modern spelling Grande Rue), Strasbourg (near the junction with rue Sainte-Barbe), and his article is accompanied by a photograph of a house that he maintains was once owned by Pierre Clavel. Antoinette had at least three siblings: a brother named Jean-Pierre, who became a gilder and a seller of prints from a shop beneath the house in the Grand'rue; Pierre-Étienne, who became a pork butcher; and a sister who appears to have been living in or near Paris during the early 1790s.

Antoinette began the study of singing and the harpsichord under her father's direction at a very young age, and quickly displayed an extraordinary musical talent. Whilst her voice was still maturing, she met the composer Jean-Baptiste Lemoyne in Warsaw in 1770, and he supervised her musical education for the next four years. She became a protégée of a Princess Lubomirska (whom it is difficult to identify with absolute precision, since there was more than one princess of that name in Warsaw at that time), and eventually obtained a contract in Berlin, where she sang with some success.

On 10 September 1775, at St. Hedwig's, in the Opernplatz, Berlin, Antoinette married Claude-Philippe Croisilles de Saint-Huberty, who claimed to be Prince Henry of Prussia's chargé d'affaires and the recruiter of new talent for the Prince's private opera company. The marriage immediately ran into difficulties. Croisilles was an incorrigible gambler; he was also a wife-beater. On a number of occasions they had to sell items of clothing and jewellery in order to meet his debts. Before long, he was one of the combatants in a duel, after which it became necessary for them to flee Berlin. The couple aimed to reach Paris, but had to stop for a time in Strasbourg after running out of money.

An alternative account of Antoinette's early years as a singer, which appears to have its roots in Edmond de Goncourt's Saint-Huberty and was subsequently taken up unquestioningly by a number of other writers, runs as follows. By the age of twelve she had mastered everything her father was able to teach her, and her vocal tuition was therefore entrusted to other masters, possibly attached to Strasbourg Cathedral. At fifteen she was a star performer at the local opera house in Strasbourg. Contract offers arrived from other cities such as Lyon and Bordeaux, but her parents were concerned that living away from home might lead her into temptation, and the offers were declined. Croisilles dit Saint-Huberty arrived in Strasbourg, and convinced her that he could launch her into a glittering operatic career. She eloped with him to Berlin, where they married, but his duplicity quickly became apparent. He left her, but she followed him to Warsaw, where he stole her goods and abandoned her again. She was rescued by one of the Lubomirska princesses and began singing in Warsaw with some success. Croisilles then lured her (by letter) to Vienna, with more false promises; he stole from and abandoned her yet again, after which she repaired alone to Paris.

=== Career at the Paris Opera ===
Antoinette sang at the theatre in Strasbourg until 1777, but her quickly-growing reputation soon led to her being engaged by the Paris Opera. On 23 September 1777, she made her début at the première of Gluck's Armide in the minor roles of Mélisse and a Pleasure. This performance brought her only modest success. All too often her acting was impaired by her extreme nervousness, and Gossec recalled that even though she was a good musician, her repeated failure to enthuse the Parisian public led to her being dismissed by the Opéra at one point, although Jacques de Vismes later readmitted her. Encouraged by Gluck, she worked hard to improve her singing and acting skills and to amend her slightly German accent, and eventually was allotted major parts, beginning with Angelique in Piccinni's Roland in 1780. The award of this role was an important step in Saint-Huberty's career, and reflects Dauvergne's confidence in her abilities and her potential.

In the meantime, the problems with her marriage continued. Crosilles de Saint-Huberty, who was now a storekeeper at the Paris Opéra, still appropriated Antoinette's jewellery and other personal effects, which he then sold or pawned, and it is evident that by summer 1778 the couple were living apart – he in rue des Orties, Saint-Rioch, and she in rue de l'Arbre-Sec. On 31 July 1778, Antoinette sought an injunction for the return of some papers, effects and sheet-music which, she alleged, he had stolen from her apartment whilst she had been at the Opéra. Her husband's defence was that, being married, their goods were held jointly, and that Antoinette, acting on bad advice, had illegally abandoned their family home to live elsewhere. On that basis, he applied to be accompanied by Antoinette's lawyer, Chénon fils, when he went to her apartment in the early morning of 31 August (his wife was still in bed) to seize items of furniture and a parcel of twenty-two letters (which, it appeared, were lettres de galanterie). Antoinette fought and screamed so loudly during this visit that she feared she might have damaged her voice. Chénon later considered it appropriate to submit a detailed report of the incident to the Lieutenant of Police. Nevertheless, in January 1781 Antoinette was able to obtain an annulment of her marriage: for a woman to be victorious after legal proceedings of this sort was extremely rare in France at that time. Edwards holds that the judges' decision was chiefly made on the grounds that it had been contracted when she was a minor and without her parents' consent, as her widowed mother, who was the main plaintiff in the case, confirmed. The fact that no children had been born from the marriage could well have been another factor in Antoinette's favour. Antoinette obtained official permission to retain her married name, Madame Saint-Huberty, for professional purposes after the annulment. With regard to the orthography – Huberty or Huberti, she herself invariably used a "y" in her signature.

Once she had established herself as one of the leading singers at the Opéra following her successes of the early 1780s, Saint-Huberty became increasingly demanding and difficult for the management to deal with. At a time when professional indiscipline and petulance amongst the artists of the Opéra was all too common, she soon became known as the worst of the troublemakers. However, the early death of Marie-Joséphine Laguerre on 14 February 1783 and the retirement around that time of the two other principal sopranos, Rosalie Duplant and Rosalie Levasseur, enabled her to cement her position as leading premier sujet du chant of the Paris Opéra. By 1782 – a year in which Saint-Huberty earned 5,500 livres, which was high by Paris Opéra standards, although when compared with the leading Italian theatres, not a particularly large amount for an artist with her appeal at the box-office – she was considered indispensable by the Opéra administration, who decided to renegotiate her contract by offering her a further 1,500 livres from Court funds: an amount originally destined for M.lle Laguerre. Antoinette responded that she would have to think the matter over. Soon afterwards she issued her demands: (i) 3,000 livres for major roles each time she sang them; (ii) an additional "gratification" fee to be paid whenever she appeared; (iii) an immediate one-off payment of 3,000 livres; (iv) a further 1,500 livres annually from the King's music fund; (v) two months' holiday every year, to include the Easter closure; (vi) no role of hers could be assigned to any other singer without her consent. On 22 March 1783 she settled for an eight-year contract worth a guaranteed minimum of 9,000 livres per annum, and compliance with her other demands, although the Minister expressed his confidence that she would, from time to time, allow others to sing the roles which she had created. She was required, on her word of honour, never to disclose her new salary arrangements to any of her colleagues for fear that it might cause unrest.

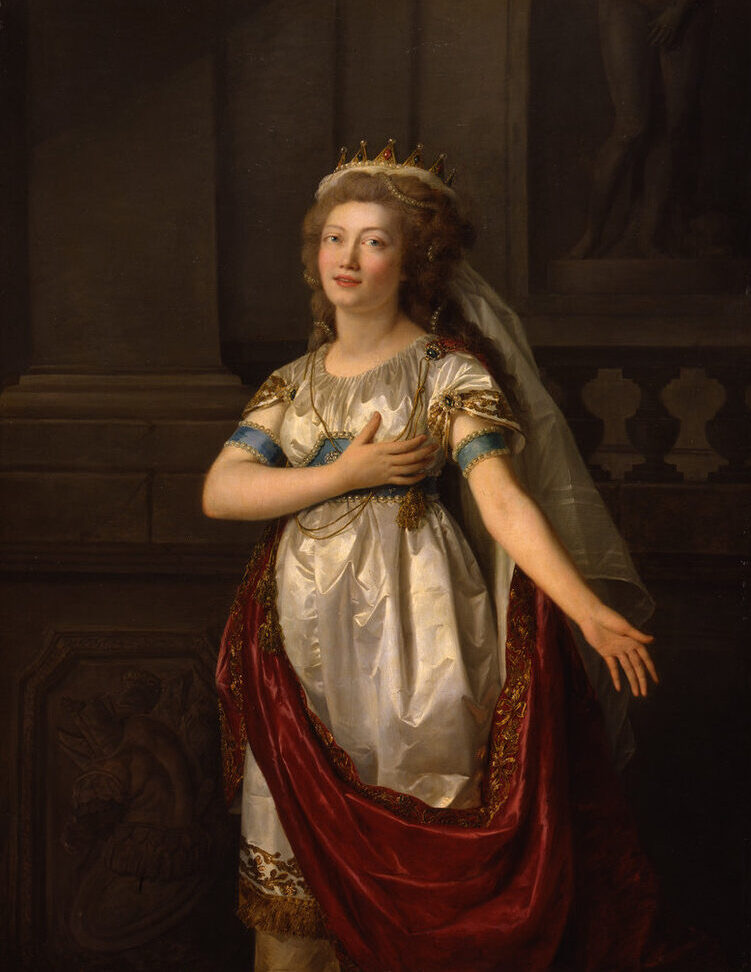
Anne Vallayer-Coster, Madame de Saint-Huberty in the role of Didon, 1785, (NWMA, Washington DC)

Saint-Huberty's financial position improved further after the enormous success she obtained in the role of Didon in Piccinni's opera of the same name in 1783. Louis XVI, who was never a great lover of opera, insisted on hearing it three times. Declaring that it "had given him as much pleasure as a fine tragedy," he gave instructions that Saint-Huberty be paid a further pension of 1,500 livres per annum. Her biographers agree that Didon was the greatest success of Saint-Huberty's career, and, given her qualities as an outstanding tragedienne, a role to which she was particularly well suited. Evidence of the enormous popularity which she enjoyed among opera enthusiasts is provided by the triumphal reception she received on visiting Marseille in 1785, and throughout the 1780s she was one of the most famous and most celebrated singers in Europe. Her holiday months were spent touring the French provincial theatres, sometimes appearing in two performances on the same day, and it has been estimated that her earnings from each of these tours was possibly as high as 16,000 livres, substantially more than she received in an entire year from the Opéra.

Some primary sources maintain that, from around 1786, Saint-Huberty's voice began to deteriorate alarmingly. One of these was Dauvergne, the director of the Opéra, who had long been exasperated by Saint-Huberty's erratic and volatile behaviour. He mentioned her vocal deterioration in a memorandum dated 21 July 1787, where he complained that she had had to withdraw from several important roles which she no longer felt capable of singing. He complained that whilst she was happy to perform twice a day when on tour, she insisted on limiting her performances at the Opéra to one (or occasionally two) per week. He predicted that her singing career would be over within two years – or less, if she were to undertake another provincial tour. In a letter of 8 November 1786, Gossec commented that Saint-Huberty was rushing inexorably towards her own destruction. However, both Dauvergne and Gossec expressed concern that no obvious candidate could take her place – indicating that, in 1786/87, she was still regarded, by the director and the head of the École de chant, as the pre-eminent soprano at the Opéra, and one whom they considered was some way ahead of M.lle Maillard (premier sujet) and M.lle Dozon (premier remplacement).

De Goncourt listed the number of Saint-Huberty's appearances at the Opéra between 1780 and 1789:

Year	Performances
1780	79
1781	66
1782	110
1783	49
1784	57
1785	36
1786	46
1787	30
1788	41
1789	44

Provided that de Goncourt's figures are reasonably accurate, it seems that Saint-Huberty reduced her appearances at the Opéra as soon as she had consolidated her position there. In the final three years of her career, she created only one new role, which is in marked contrast with what was happening previously. By 1787, however, her motivation appears to have almost entirely evaporated, and to the management she had become a thorough nuisance. In the spring of that year she wrote to Dauvergne to express her "disgust and vexation" brought about by the theatre administration's "continual complaints". She claimed that her health was being adversely affected, and she was seriously considering retirement. This tension continued until 1790.

She became the mistress of Count Alfonso Maria Turconi, a rich Italian music-lover who owned a magnificent villa (the Villa Turconi) near Mendrisio on the Swiss-Italian border. At the same time, she was the mistress of Louis-Alexandre de Launay, comte d'Antraigues, whom she met in 1783 and took as a lover during the latter half of 1784. This double liaison has been interpreted as follows: Turconi was "the man who was willing to pay the bills," whereas d'Antraigues was more of a gallant-adventurer and the man she preferred. Both men were aware of the situation, but appear to have accepted it. Turconi purchased a small château at Groslay in the vale of Montmorency as a gift for Antoinette, yet d'Antraigues was able to have his own room there. D'Antraigues was not the most faithful of lovers: Duckworth maintains that he was conducting a simultaneous affair with at least one of the ladies at court.

Prior to the French Revolution, d'Antraigues had been broadly in sympathy with many of the ideas which became revolutionary ideals. On 4 April 1789 he was elected to the Estates General as a representative of the noblesse of the province of Vivarais. However, later that year his attitude underwent a profound change, and he became a counter-revolutionary. On 27 February 1790, after being implicated in a plot to help the royal family escape from the Tuileries Palace, he fled France and made for Lausanne in Switzerland.

On or around 3 April 1790, having obtained a passport, Antoinette left Paris with her chamber-maid and two other servants to join d'Antrigues as an émigré. She never sung at the Opéra again. The property at Groslay was seized a few months after her departure, and some of its contents sold by order of the district authorities at Gonesse, despite the formal protests of her sister.

=== Repertoire ===
The operas in which Mme. Saint-Huberty appeared include the following:

Opera	Composer	Role(s)	Comment
Le bouquet de Colette	Jean-Baptiste Lemoyne		1775, at Warsaw. (Her operatic debut, according to Clayton).
Zémire et Azor	André Grétry		At Warsaw. (Her operatic debut, according to de Goncourt).
Armide	Christoph Willibald Gluck	Mélisse; a Pleasure/Armide	23 September 1777 (premiere)/1784
Iphigénie en Aulide	Christoph Willibald Gluck	Iphigénie/Clytemnestre	July 1778/April 1785
Laure et Pétrarche	Pierre-Joseph Candeille	Chloé	2 July 1780 (Work performed only twice)
Damète et Zulmis	Jean-Bernard Mayer (?)	La Bohemienne	2 July 1780 (premiere) (Work performed only twice)
Roland	Niccolò Piccinni	Angélique	28 November 1780
Le Seigneur bienfaisant	Étienne-Joseph Floquet	Lise	14 December 1780 (premiere)
Émilie	André Gretry	Émilie	22 February 1781 (premiere) (Work performed only once)
L'Inconnue persecutée	Pasquale Anfossi	Laurette	21 September 1781 (premiere)
Thésée	François-Joseph Gossec	Églé	1 March 1782 (premiere)
Iphigénie en Tauride	Christoph Willibald Gluck	Iphigénie	10 March 1782
Électre	Jean-Baptiste Lemoyne	Chrysothémis	2 July 1782 (premiere)
Ariane dans l'isle de Naxos	Jean-Frédéric Edelmann	Ariane	24 September 1782 (premiere)
L'embarras des richesses	André Grétry	Rosette	26 November 1782. (premiere)
Atys	Niccolò Piccinni	Sangaride	14 January 1783
Renaud	Antonio Sacchini	Armide	14 March 1783
Péronne sauvée	Nicolas Dezède	Marie	27 May 1783 (premiere)
Didon	Niccolò Piccinni	Didon	Fontainebleau, 16 October 1783 (premiere)
Chimène	Antonio Sacchini	Chimène	Fontainebleau, 16 November 1783 (premiere)
Tibulle et Délie	'Mademoiselle Beaumesnil' (stage name of Henriette-Adélaïde de Villars)	Délie	15 March 1784 (premiere)
Les Danaïdes	Antonio Salieri	Hypermnestre	26 April 1784 (premiere)
Panurge dans l'isle des lanternes	André Grétry	Climène	25 January 1785 (premiere)
Thémistocle	François-André Danican Philidor	Mandane	Fontainebleau, 13 October 1785 (premiere)
Pénélope	Niccolò Piccinni	Pénélope	Fontainebleau, 2 November 1785 (premiere)
Alceste	Christoph Willibald Gluck	Alceste	24 February 1786
Phèdre	Jean-Baptiste Lemoyne	Phèdre	Fontainebleau, 26 October 1786 (premiere)
Les Horaces	Antonio Salieri	Camille	7 December 1786 (premiere)
Démophoon	Luigi Cherubini	Dircé	2 December 1788 (premiere)
Nephté (?)	Jean-Baptiste Lemoyne	Nephté (?)	NOT in the premiere cast on 15 December 1789
Le faux Lord	Niccolò Piccinni		Paris, Comédie-Italienne
Le devin du village	Jean-Jacques Rousseau	Colette	

=== Costume design, and influence on fashion ===
At the time when Madame Saint-Huberty began her career, it was customary for actors and singers who performed female roles drawn from Classical mythology to wear highly unauthentic wigs and hoop skirts, sometimes with a train borne by pages. After she became a premier sujet du chant, Saint-Huberty insisted that her theatrical costumes should reflect, as accurately as possible, the period in which the drama was set. She would therefore consult with the artist Jean-Michel Moreau, and have her costumes prepared to her own specifications in Greek or Roman style. This caused a great amount of vexation to the management of the Opéra, since it added what they considered to be an unreasonable amount to the costs of a production and it also set dangerous precedents, but the move was well-received by audiences. On one occasion in 1783, in an attempt to achieve authenticity, she appeared on the stage with naked legs and with one breast exposed, which led to the government subsequently forbidding such practices. Nevertheless, her innovations in the field of costume design, when taken as a whole, are judged to have been of significant importance.

Saint-Huberty also had an influence, albeit a slighter one, on fashion. Her enormous success in Didon inspired the design of an elegant gentleman's waistcoat, in embroidered silk, depicting the scene in which Didon is abandoned by Énée. Since 1962 the waistcoat has formed part of the collection of the Cooper-Hewitt, National Design Museum in New York, although it is not currently (October 2013) on public display. The figure of Didon is based upon a portrait by André Dutertre of Madame Saint-Huberty in the role. An engraved version of this portrait later became very popular as a print.

== Later years ==
Antoinette spent the first three months of exile in a village near Lausanne. D'Antraigues lived opposite and took his meals with her. They were married in great secrecy on 29 December 1790 at Castel San Pietro, near Mendrisio, in Italian-speaking Switzerland. Permission to dispense with the formality of banns was granted by the Bishop of Como. By this time the couple had made their home in Count Turconi's villa, which remained their main base during the first few years of their marriage. Although they lived comfortably, they did little or no entertaining there, and the only regular visitors were the clergy who came to perform Mass in the chapel on Sundays. Their marriage would not become public for over six years, in part because d'Antraigues's mother would have opposed it, and he wished to avoid, or delay, a confrontation.

D'Antraigues continued to be extremely active politically, and in this he was supported by Mme. Saint-Huberty (by which name she was still known). Apart from producing a constant stream of counter-revolutionary propaganda, he was heavily involved in a network of counter-revolutionary intelligence: indeed he has been described as "the central figure in the counter-revolutionary espionage network in Europe" between 1791 and 1812. His role was threefold: (i) the collection of intelligence; (ii) the assessment of its significance; and (iii) the alteration of intelligence (and, specifically, of diplomatic reports), where necessary, in such a way as to promote the restoration of the monarchy. In order to bring this about, he aimed to present intelligence in such a way that the British government might be persuaded to declare war on the French Republic. News received from secret agents in Paris was forwarded to contacts in Spain, England, Portugal and Imperial Russia.

In 1791 Antoinette returned to Paris, ostensibly to attend to various business matters. She remained there until early 1792, when, now entering the second trimester of pregnancy, she left for Milan. Whilst they were in – or near – Milan in March 1792, d'Antraigues's ancestral home, the chateau of la Bastide at Juvinas in the Rhône-Alpes was attacked, ransacked, and totally destroyed by a band of rioters; and other properties belonging to him were looted and badly damaged. On 26 June 1792 Antoinette gave birth to a son, who was baptized Pierre-Antoine-Emmanuel-Jules at a church in Greco two days later. The birthplace of Jules (as he was known) is uncertain, but was probably in Milan or somewhere in its immediate neighbourhood. One view is that, during her confinement, Antoinette lodged at the house of a Dr Moscati, who lived in a village outside Milan. D'Antraigues's presence did not pass unobserved – on 11 February 1792 the Archduke Ferdinand notified Vienna that d'Antraigues was "visiting M.lle Saint-Huberti"(sic), who was believed to be recovering from an illness, and it had been thought prudent to place him under surveillance. Because of d'Antraigues's wish that their marriage remain a secret, Antoinette's chamber-maid, Madame Sibot, was declared to be the child's mother, although on the baptism certificate d'Antraigues acknowledged paternity and gave Jules his surname. Mme. Sibot and her husband were asked to attend to his upbringing, and to pass the boy as their own. As soon as Antoinette was fit enough to travel, the family and the servants returned to the Villa Turconi. D'Antraigues and Antoinette had no further children, although Pingaud contends that an earlier child, who lived only briefly, was born to the couple soon after their relationship started.

One of d'Antraigues's contacts was don Simon de Las Casas, the Spanish ambassador to the Most Serene Republic of Venice. In June 1793, in order to provide him with a greater degree of political security – and also with an income, Las Casas arranged for d'Antraigues to be appointed to the Spanish legation in Venice. At the same time, the Count of Provence (who, after the execution of Louis XVI that January, had assumed the Regency of France) entrusted him with the diplomatic task of safeguarding his interests in Venice. This enabled Saint-Huberty, her son and servants, to finally leave Villa Turconi. At Verona, whilst on their way to Venice, it appears that there was a quarrel of some sort between Antoinette and Madame Sibot, which resulted in the latter's immediate dismissal (or resignation).

The second treaty of the Peace of Basel (22 July 1795) brought the war between Spain and France to an end. In order to regain his political security and to demonstrate his support for the Royalist cause, d'Antraigues transferred from the Spanish to the Russian legation at Venice. In doing so, he became the link between Louis XVIII and Catherine the Great, and – simultaneously – gained Russian protection for himself by virtue of being an attaché at the Russian legation. The move was facilitated by Las Casas, who introduced him to the Russian ambassador at Naples: the ambassador then recommended him to the Empress Catherine. Letters written by Las Casas and quoted by de Goncourt indicate that, whilst in Venice, Saint-Huberty attended the opera from time to time, and was also invited to private musical gatherings. In April 1795 the Republican Paris newspaper L'instituteur national carried a report that Monsieur (i.e. Louis XVIII in exile) had conferred the sash of Saint-Michel to Saint-Huberty for her services to music, and she now wore it ostentatiously whenever she was at the theatre or out walking. The writer also drew attention to the now common rumour that d'Antraigues, with whom she was living, had married her.

With the collapse of the Republic of Venice in May 1797 and the city's occupation by French troops, the Russian legation closed. On 16 May its members attempted to leave the area. D'Antraigues (taking three portfolios full of papers), Saint-Huberty and Jules travelled with them. At Trieste, which had fallen to Jean Baptiste Bernadotte, they were halted, and, despite the protest of the Russian minister Aleksandr Simeonovich Mordvinov, d'Antraigues was arrested on the evening of 21 May. Antoinette, who was not being guarded, managed to destroy the contents of two of the portfolios, leaving the third, which she believed contained nothing more than literary manuscripts. She was, however, mistaken – the third portfolio contained important papers which were seized. Of these, the key document was one which summarized a conversation between d'Antraigues and a spy named Montgalliard the previous year. (Montgalliard – if indeed he really was the man d'Antraigues met – may have been working as a double agent.) Taking leave of Mordvinov prior to being escorted away, d'Antraigues entrusted Antoinette and Jules to his care, but they refused to abandon him. Their action prompted d'Antraigues to acknowledge publicly, for the first time, that they were his wife and son.

The family was taken to Milan, where d'Antraigues was interrogated by Napoleon Bonaparte. Initially he was held prisoner in a former convent, but after a few days he was moved to a cell in the Sforza Castle. Saint-Huberty and Jules took lodgings in the city. Quite apart from her newly acquired rank of countess, Saint-Huberty's international reputation still carried considerable weight, and she was able to make frequent calls on Joséphine de Beauharnais, who was also in Milan. During one of these visits she had the opportunity to speak to Bonaparte, who, ten years previously, when he was a young officer in the artillery, had attended and had been deeply moved by a gala performance of Didon which she had given in Strasbourg. Antoinette now put on a fiery performance. When Bonaparte reminded her that he could, if he wished, issue an order for her husband to be shot, she pushed the young Jules towards him, and challenged him to have the boy killed along with his father. She then threatened to go to Paris in person "to obtain justice" (by which she meant that she was capable of creating trouble for Bonaparte with powerful people in Paris who already were concerned by his habit of exceeding his allotted powers). She screamed that Bonaparte was Robespierre reincarnate, and de Beauharnais had great difficulty in calming her. Bonaparte was shrewd enough to realise that eliminating his prisoner there and then would bring no real advantage, and that it could – perhaps – work against his own interests.

During his captivity, d'Antraigues was treated with increasing laxity. After a few days in cell No. 10 at the Sforza Castle, he was transferred to a spacious apartment in the same building, where Antoinette and Jules were permitted to join him, and later the family moved, with d'Antraigues placed under house arrest, to the palace of a Marquis Andreoli. However, orders were given that Saint-Huberty be kept in Milan, and that all correspondence from or addressed to either of the couple be intercepted. Nevertheless, as time went on, d'Antraigues was eventually allowed to pay visits to a library and to take walks, provided that he was attended by guards, who would keep at a discreet distance.

On the evening of 29 August 1797, Saint-Huberty, drawing on her years of experience in the theatre, helped her husband to disguise himself as a priest. He wore a cassock, an ecclesiastical wig, a beard, green-tinted spectacles, and appropriate make-up. His guards failed to recognize him as he made his way to a pre-arranged rendezvous in the church of San Celso, and early the following morning he was taken by closed carriage to Bellinzona. Because Saint-Huberty spread reports that d'Antraigues was ill and confined to his bed, his escape was not discovered until 4 September, and it was not reported in the Milan newspapers until the 14th. In the meantime, she had obtained a passport for herself, which was issued on 27 August, i.e. before the escape, on the pretext that she needed to go to Trieste to collect some money – as indeed she informed Mme. Bonaparte. Jules was sent to stay with his former wet nurse for a few days. Antoinette then pretended to change her plans – the journey to Trieste had to be postponed whilst she (supposedly) was caring for her husband, who was far too ill to receive visitors. As soon as she received word that d'Antraigues was safely out of the country, she disguised herself as a peasant herb-seller, and made her way out of Milan. After a few days, she, Jules and d'Antraigues reunited in Innsbruck. According to a dispatch from Paris dated 21 September, the official Parisian newspapers were silent on news of the escape, although it was variously reported in private prints. For this reason, The Times in London expressed some scepticism as to whether any escape on the part of d'Antraigues and Saint-Huberty had taken place.

Saint-Huberty and her family lived in Graz (1797–1799), Vienna (1799–1802) and Dresden (1802–1806), before moving to London. In 1808 their address was 45 Devonshire Street, Portland Place, although they also had addresses at various times at 67 Princes Gate and at a place known as "Jacobi House." Around 1809 the couple purchased a house at The Terrace, Barnes, on the outskirts of London. They also had a West End property at 7 Queen Anne Street.

== Death ==
One day in early July 1812, during the Comte's temporary absence from the house, the Comtesse was in her bedroom at Barnes, attended by her maid, Susannah Black. They suddenly heard a single loud noise, and, believing that someone might have knocked at the front door, Black ran downstairs to answer, but found no-one there. On returning upstairs, the Comtesse met her at the bedroom door and remarked that the noise had sounded like a pistol shot. Black went upstairs to the Comte's room, and discovered a Piedmontese non-liveried servant who had been in the family's employment for about three months and who was known simply as Lawrence (or Lorenzo, in some sources) standing inside, holding a smoking pistol. On being asked what he was doing, he replied "Nothing." He later admitted to the Comtesse that he had been handling the pistol and that it had discharged itself accidentally. In consequence, Lawrence was severely reprimanded. A newspaper report, published after the events of 22 July stated that the Comte was in the habit of keeping a dagger and a pair of pistols ready and loaded in his bedroom.

On the morning of 22 July 1812, the Comte and Comtesse ordered that their carriage be ready for them at eight o'clock, as they wished to travel into London. Their coachman, David Hebditch, brought the carriage to the front door at a few minutes before eight, and on his arrival, Lawrence opened the door of the conveyance and placed a can of oil inside. He then went back into the house momentarily, but soon returned outside. The Comtesse came downstairs, attended by Black (who was carrying some books), and another servant, Elizabeth Ashton. Black ordered Lawrence to open the carriage door for her mistress, but he went back into the house and very soon afterwards a pistol shot was heard. Witnesses saw the Comte descending the staircase, followed by Lawrence, who had a pistol in one hand and a dagger in the other. Hebditch saw Lawrence plunge the dagger into the Comte's left shoulder: Lawrence then came outside and stabbed Antoinette in the breast as she sought to return to the front door. She slumped unconscious to the ground. Ashton, in a panic, rushed to the Sun public house nearby to summon help, whilst the other witnesses attempted to give assistance to the wounded. In the confusion, Lawrence re-entered the house, and a minute or so later another pistol shot was heard.

Two surgeons, Matthew Ball, of Barnes, and a Mr. King, were immediately called to the house. King, assisted by Hebditch, stripped the Comte (who had managed to stagger up to his bedroom) and attempted to treat the wound, but there was little that could be done, and he died very soon afterwards. Ball, who examined Antoinette, found that she had suffered a stab wound to her right breast; the blade had then penetrated deeply into her thoracic cavity, passing between the third and fourth ribs. She had lost a great deal of blood, and died within minutes of Ball's arrival.

Lawrence's body was found lying face down on the floor of the Comte's room. He had shot himself in the mouth. A bullet was found lodged in his cervical vertebrae, indicating that he would have been killed instantly.

An inquest was held by the coroner for Surrey, Charles Jemmett, at the White Hart Hotel in Barnes, on 23 July 1812. After viewing the three bodies and hearing the evidence provided by various witnesses under oath, the jury, after only five minutes' deliberation, returned a verdict that, firstly, the Comte and Comtesse had been murdered by Lawrence, and that, secondly, Lawrence had then committed suicide, "being in his senses" (sic).

After the inquest, Lawrence's body was buried in a shallow grave on land not far from some houses. A few days afterwards, a correspondent wrote a letter to The Times to denounce the fact that the grave had been opened on a number of occasions purely "to gratify the horrible curiosity of some idle people." Two stagecoaches conveying men, women and children had paused in order to allow the passengers to view "the disgusting scene" for what was claimed to have been twenty minutes. Even the two hearses which were carrying the bodies of the Comte and Comtesse had drawn up beside the murderer's grave so that the hearse attendants might take a glimpse of his corpse.

On 27 July 1812, most likely after a Requiem Mass, the bodies of the Comte and Comtesse d'Antraigues were buried in the graveyard of St Pancras Old Church, London. In the early 1980s Duckworth searched the cemetery but was unable to find any headstone or other marker of their grave, which, he assumes, must have been disturbed during excavation work in the 1860s when the Midland Railway was building its new London terminus.

The reasons for the murders are unclear. At the time, rumours spread that the Comte and Comtesse had been assassinated on the orders of the British government or Napoleon Bonaparte.

Among the deceased Comte's papers, secret clauses pertaining to a number of diplomatic treaties were discovered, together with the original copy of the will made by Louis XVI. These documents were of the very highest political importance.

== In fiction and film ==
La chanteuse poignardée is a fictionalized biography of Madame Saint Huberty written by Germaine Beauguitte and published as a paperback in April 1962. Beauguitte describes her book as a une biographie romancée rather than an accurate representation of historical fact. The plot appears to follow Edmond de Goncourt's biographical study to a large extent, which, in its turn, may be less than reliable. An unusual feature about Beauguitte's book is that it includes a preliminary chapter written by the artist and historical biographer Marie-Magdeleine de Rasky (1897–1982), who claimed to be the reincarnation of Madame Saint-Huberty. Rasky's assertion was made on the basis that (i) her mind was haunted by scenes and visions of places which, although she had never visited them, somehow appeared familiar; on visiting these places (sometimes quite by chance) and recognising that they corresponded with the earlier visions, she discovered that they had a close association with Saint-Huberty: and that (ii) although she had not been injured, she nevertheless carried a large scar above her left breast, which seemingly tallied with de Goncourt's account of Saint-Huberty's death. (Although 1812 accounts of the murder were not always consistent, this part of de Rasky's claim contradicts Matthew Ball's testimony at the inquest that the dagger had entered Saint-Huberty's right breast.)

The character Mme de Saint-Huberty appeared in the 1979 television serial Joséphine ou la comédie des ambitions, directed by Robert Mazoyer. The role was played by Gisèle Grimm.
