= Louis Fauche-Borel =

French counter-revolutionary

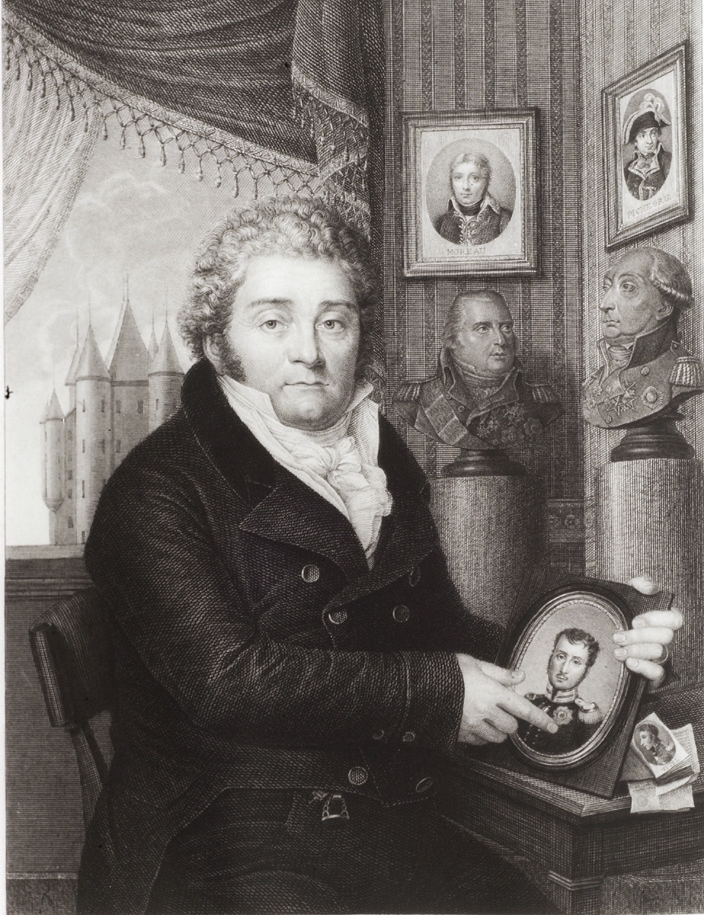
- Born: April 12, 1762
- Died: September 4, 1829 (aged 67); Neuchâtel, Switzerland
- Occupation: Counter revolutionary

Louis Fauche-Borel (12 April 1762 – 4 September 1829) was a French counter-revolutionary and member of the Royalist movement during the French Revolution and First French Empire. He was born and died in Neuchâtel.

== French Revolution ==
Printer to the king of Prussia - the Principality of Neuchâtel was at that point Prussian - a Freemason and a Calvinist, Fauche-Borel welcomed the French Revolution. However, the influx of French émigrés radically altered his opinions and he became affiliated with the counter-revolution. In 1795, Montgaillard made him responsible for making contact with Jean-Charles Pichegru and Louis Joseph, Prince of Condé. He succeeded in this mission, was arrested but released, and returned to Switzerland.

He made contact with Pichegru in June 1796 at Arbois, and then in Paris in August. The Coup of 18 Fructidor (4 September 1797) put an end to the conspiracy. He tried to get in touch with Paul Barras to rally him to the Bourbon cause. In London, he regained contact with Pichegru, who had escaped from French Guiana. He worked for the agence royaliste of Augsburg, or Swabia. Assisted by the marquis of Maisonfort, he tried again to bring Barras into the royalist camp. He met with Louis XVIII in Mitau. The coup of 18 Brumaire (9 November 1799) put an end to his efforts.

== Consulate and First Empire ==
In 1801, he sought to reconcile Moreau and Pichegru to have them embrace the royalist cause. Denounced and arrested at Paris in July 1802, he escaped on January 1, 1804, but was recaptured nine days later. He was released in February 1806, after having promised to work for the French government. He wrote some insignificant reports, but secretly printed the proclamations of Louis XVIII to send to Paris. Joseph Fouché ordered his arrest. He fled to London. A machination by Fouché led him to believe that a royalist committee was bringing together high-ranking personages in Paris. This brought him into conflict with Joseph-Geneviève de Puisaye, who did not believe in the existence of this committee. He was exiled to Jersey, where he remained until the Restoration.

== Restoration ==
Following the accession of Louis XVIII, it was discovered that he had been manipulated by the Imperial police. Following a suit demonstrating his innocence, he received compensation for services rendered. But, suffering from neurasthenia, he committed suicide by defenestration in his home at Neuchâtel.

He left behind his Mémoires, published at Paris in 1829.
