= Camma =

Galatian princess and priestess of Artemis

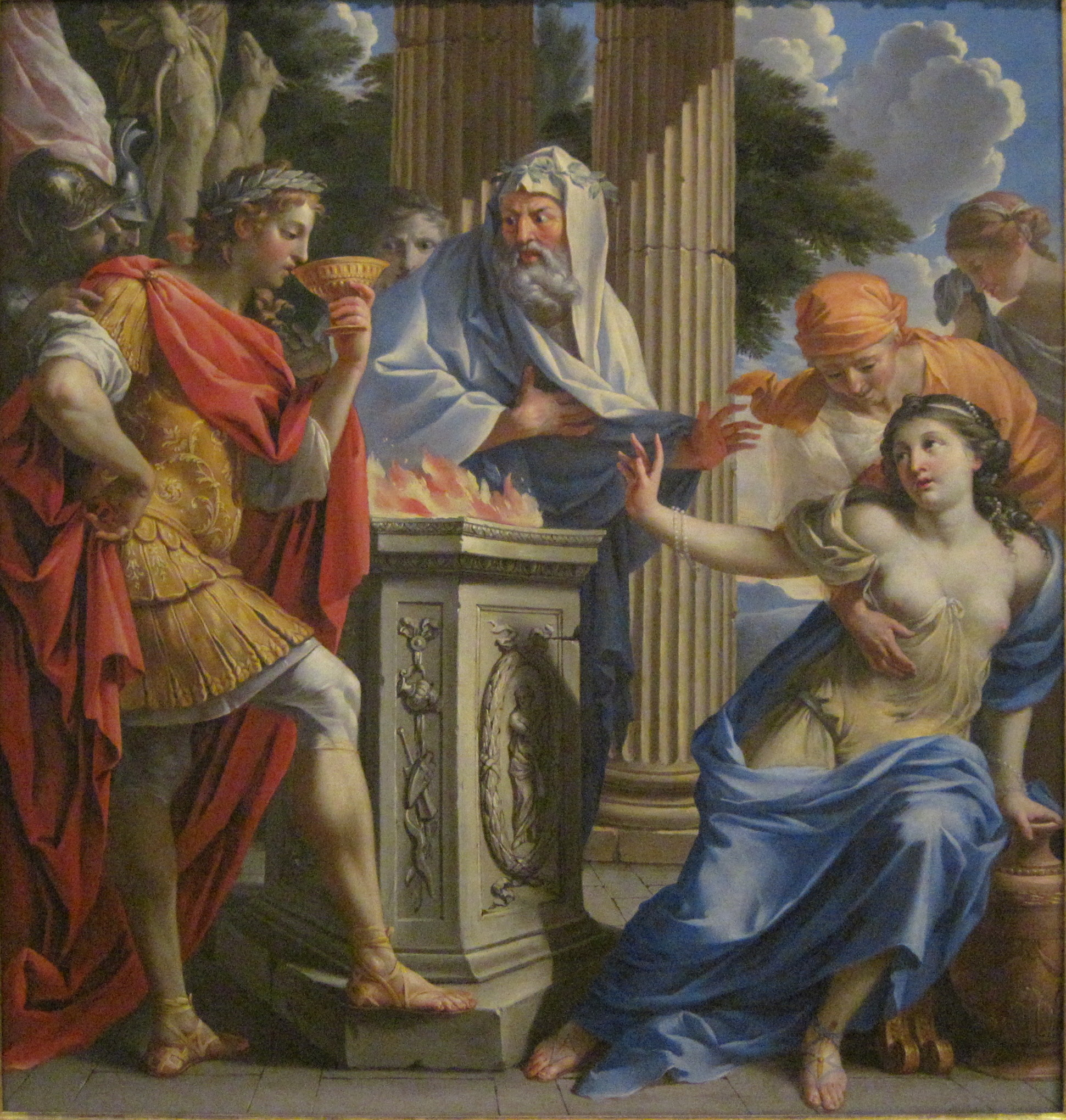
The poisoning of Camma and Synorix in the temple of Diana (Charles Poerson, 17th century).

Camma (Ancient Greek: Κάμμα) was a Galatian princess and priestess of Artemis whom Plutarch writes about in both On the Bravery of Women and the Eroticus or Amatorius. As Plutarch is the only source on Camma, her historicity cannot be independently verified. In both works, Plutarch cites her as an exemplar of fidelity and courage in love.

In Plutarch's accounts, Camma was wedded to the tetrarch Sinatus, and became known and admired for her virtue and beauty. Sinatus' rival, another tetrarch named Sinorix, murdered Sinatus and proceeded to woo Camma herself. Rather than submit to Sinorix' advances, Camma took him to a temple of Artemis where she served poison to both herself and him in a libation of either milk and honey or mead. Camma died happily, according to Plutarch, in the knowledge that she had avenged the death of her husband.

John Koch and Antone Minard derive "Sinatus" from Galatian *Sugnātos "well-suited" and Sinorix from Galatian *Seno-rīxs "old king". They suggest that the meanings of the names are indicative of legend.

Plutarch's story of Camma inspired a number of works of later art and literature. Polyaenus briefly reprises Plutarch's tale in his 2nd-century CE Stratagems of War. In the Renaissance, the story of Camma enjoyed considerable popularity, inspiring De re uxoria by Barbaro, De institutione feminae christianae by Vives, the Libro del cortegiano by Castiglione, and Orlando furioso by Ariosto (where Camma is renamed Drusilla). Thomas Corneille wrote a play named Camma (1661) about the story of the Galatian princess. The opera Nephté (1789) by Jean-Baptiste Lemoyne uses the story of Camma but moves the setting to Ancient Egypt. Tennyson subsequently wrote the tragedy The Cup (1884), in which Camma is again a Galatian princess. The poem ‘Camma’ by Oscar Wilde has been seen as a hedonistic commentary on Plutarch's Camma.
