= Louis-Alexandre de Launay, comte d'Antraigues =

French pamphleteer, diplomat, spy and political adventurer (1753 - 1812)

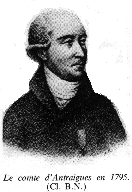
- Born: 25 December 1753; Montpellier, France
- Died: 22 July 1812 (aged 58); Barnes, Surrey, England
- Occupations: Spy; pamphleteer; diplomat; political adventurer
- Family: Antoinette Saint-Huberty (wife)

Emmanuel Henri Louis Alexandre de Launay, comte d'Antraigues (25 December 1753 – 22 July 1812) was a French pamphleteer, diplomat, spy and political adventurer during the French Revolution and Napoleonic Wars.

== Early life ==
At the age of 14, d'Antraigues joined the army. Initially a member of the Garde du Corps at the Palace of Versailles, he eventually became a captain of the Royal Piedmont Cavalry Regiment. Increasingly, though, he became dissatisfied with army life as he became acquainted with several of the leading lights of the Age of Enlightenment. In 1770, he met Jean-Jacques Rousseau and struck up a relationship with him that lasted until Rousseau's death. Later, in 1776, he spent several months at Ferney with Voltaire. Imbued with the democratic ideals of these mentors, d'Antraigues happily resigned his military post in 1778. Soon afterward, he accompanied his uncle, François-Emmanuel Guignard, comte de Saint-Priest, the French ambassador to the Ottoman Empire, to Constantinople. Later that year, he made an excursion to see Egypt. In 1779, he began his trip home, visiting the cities of Warsaw, Kraków and Vienna.

On his return to Paris, he entered the circles of philosophes and artists, where he became friendly with the future revolutionaries Nicolas Chamfort and Mirabeau.

== French Revolution ==
Initially a firm supporter of the French Revolution, d'Antraigues published a Mémoire sur les Etats Généraux ("Dissertation on the Estates-General") in 1788. In it, he was one of the first to identify the Third Estate as "the nation". In a famous passage, he wrote:

"The Third Estate is the People and the People is the foundation of the State; it is in fact the State itself... It is in the People that all national power resides and it is for the People that all states exist."

In 1789, he was elected as a deputy to the Estates-General by the noblesse of Vivarais. Although he opposed the creation of the National Assembly, he took the Tennis Court Oath, and subsequently joined the National Constituent Assembly. Later, however, he abandoned his revolutionary principles when Versailles was stormed by an angry mob from Paris on 5 October 1789. Horrified at the near death of Queen Marie Antoinette, whom it was rumored he had unsuccessfully tried to seduce years earlier, he suddenly changed his vision completely, becoming a defender of the Bourbon Monarchy. He soon became part of a plot by the Marquis de Favras to help the royal family escape from the Tuileries Palace in Paris where they had been forced to move by the mob that had attacked Versailles. In December, Favras was arrested, and d'Antraigues was exposed. In February 1790, after Favras had been executed, d'Antraigues fled France and became an émigré.

== Diplomat, conspirator, and spy ==
He first escaped to Lausanne, Switzerland where he was quickly followed by his mistress, Madame de Saint-Huberty, one of Marie Antoinette's favorite opera singers. They soon married and moved to Italy where a son was born. In the Republic of Venice, he became an attaché to the Spanish embassy, and then to the Russian legation. In 1793, he became a secret agent for the comte de Provence, the future King Louis XVIII. When Provence moved his court-in-exile to Verona, a town controlled by the Venetians, d'Antraigues acted as his minister of police. The Venetian government later expelled Louis XVIII from its territory in 1796 as a direct result of threats from France, but d'Antraigues remained in Venice.

He was forced to leave, however, when the French Directory invaded Italy in 1797. Travelling with the Russian ambassador to Venice and his entourage as they attempted to flee, d'Antraigues was arrested in Trieste by French troops, who then transported him and his family to Milan. There, he was interrogated by Napoleon Bonaparte. When Napoleon went through d'Antraigues' private papers, which had been confiscated, he discovered that among them were notes concerning a 1796 interview d'Antraigues had had with a supposedly counter-revolutionary spy, the comte de Montgaillard, who was seeking money from d'Antraigues to finance future intrigues. In the interview, Montgaillard detailed his past negotiations with General Charles Pichegru over the betrayal of the French Republic. Despite this discovery and being under house arrest, d'Antraigues and his family were able to escape to Austria.

Soon after, Louis XVIII dismissed him as an agent because he feared that d'Antraigues had willingly betrayed the Pichegru negotiations and other Royalist secrets to Napoleon in exchange for his freedom. More likely, the escape was due to the intervention of Napoleon's aristocratic wife, Joséphine de Beauharnais, who greatly admired the singing skills of d'Antraigues' famous wife. The experience greatly embittered d'Antraigues toward Louis XVIII. In 1798, he claimed that Malesherbes, Louis XVI's last lawyer, had entrusted him with papers written by the King shortly before his execution, stating that his brother, the future Louis XVIII, had betrayed the royal cause out of personal ambition and for that reason alone should not succeed him on the throne.

For the next five years, d'Antraigues and his family lived in Graz and Vienna on an allowance provided by Czar Paul I of Russia. In Vienna, he became friends with the Prince de Ligne and Baron Gustav Armfelt, the Swedish ambassador to the Holy Roman Empire.

In 1802, Czar Alexander I of Russia sent him as a Russian attaché to Dresden, the capital of the Kingdom of Saxony, but in 1806 he published a violent pamphlet against Napoleon and the French Empire, and was expelled by the Saxon government. He then went to London where he developed a close relationship with both George Canning, the British Foreign Secretary, and the Duke of Kent, one of King George III's sons. It was universally believed that d'Antraigues was the agent who revealed the secrets articles of the Treaty of Tilsit to the British cabinet, but his biographer, Leonce Pingaud, contests this. In England, he also became an intimate of fellow émigrés, Charles François Dumouriez and the duc d'Orléans (the future King Louis Philippe of the French).

Throughout his long exile (1790–1812), he published a number of pamphlets (Des monstres ravagent partout, Point d'accommodement, etc.) against both the French Revolution and Napoleon.

== Assassination ==
In 1812 he and his wife, the operatic soprano Antoinette Saint-Huberty, were assassinated with a stiletto at their country home at 27 Barnes Terrace in Barnes, Surrey, England by an Italian servant whom they had dismissed. It has never been established whether the murder was committed from private or political motives. Some claimed that the motive behind the murders was simply the fact that d'Antraigues' wife treated her servants badly. Others saw more sinister political machinations at work. Both Napoleon and Louis XVIII had ample cause to want d'Antraigues removed from the scene.

== Sources ==
- In turn, it cites as references:
  - Edmond de Goncourt, La Saint-Huberty et l'opéra au XVIIIe siècle
  - Leonce Pingaud, Un Agent secret sous la révolution et l'empire, le comte d'Antraigues (Paris, 1893)
  - H. Vaschalde, Notice bibliographique sur Louis Alexandre de Launay, comte d'Antraigues, sa vie et ses œuvres
- Colin Duckworth, The D'Antraigues Phenomenon: The Making and Breaking of a Revolutionary Royalist Espionage Agent (Newcastle upon Tyne, Avero Publications Ltd., 1986)
