= Électre (opera) =

Électre (Electra) is an opera by the French composer Jean-Baptiste Lemoyne, first performed at the Académie Royale de Musique (the Paris Opéra) on 2 July 1782. It takes the form of a tragédie lyrique in three acts. The libretto, by Nicolas-François Guillard, is based on the Greek myth of Electra.

== Roles ==
Roles, voice types, premiere cast
Cast	Voice type	Premiere cast
Égisthe (Aegisthus)	baritone	François Lays
Clytemnestre (Clytemnestra)	soprano	Françoise-Claude-Marie-Rosalie Campagne (called Mlle Duplant)
Électre (Electra)	soprano	Rosalie Levasseur
Oreste (Orestes)	basse taille (bass-baritone)	Henri Larrivée
Pilade (Pylades)	taille (baritenor)	Étienne Lainez
Arcas	basse taille (bass-baritone)	Moreau
Chrysothémis (Chrysothemis)	soprano	Antoinette Saint-Huberty
Un officer du palais (an officer of the palace)	basse taille (bass-baritone)	Simon Chénard
Le grand prêtre (the high priest)	basse taille (bass-baritone)	Simon Chénard
Une Argienne (a woman of Argos)	soprano	Suzanne Joinville
Un Argien (a man of Argos)	haute-contre	Jean-Joseph Rousseau
Chorus: Lords and ladies of the court, people of Mycenae, Trojan captives, Eumenides, demons

== Sources ==
- Original libretto: Electre,//Tragédie//en 3 actes,//Représentée//Pour la première fois,//Par l'Académie-royale//de musique,//Le Mardi 2 Juillet 1782, Paris, De Lormel, 1782, via Gallica – BNF (in French)
- Original printed score: Electre//Tragédie,//en Trois Actes,//Mise en Musique et Dediée//à la Reine//par Mr. Le Moyne, Paris, Chez l'auteur, 1782, via Gallica – BNF
- Félix Clément and Pierre Larousse, Dictionnaire des Opéras, p. 245. (in French)
- Benoît Dratwicki, "Foreigners at the Académie Royale de Musique" in Antonio Sacchini, Renaud, Madrid, Ediciones Singulares, 2013 (book accompanying the complete recording conducted by Christophe Rousset). ISBN 978-84-939-6865-6
