= Pénélope (Piccinni) =

French-language opera by Niccolò Piccinni

- Tragédie lyrique by Niccolò Piccinni
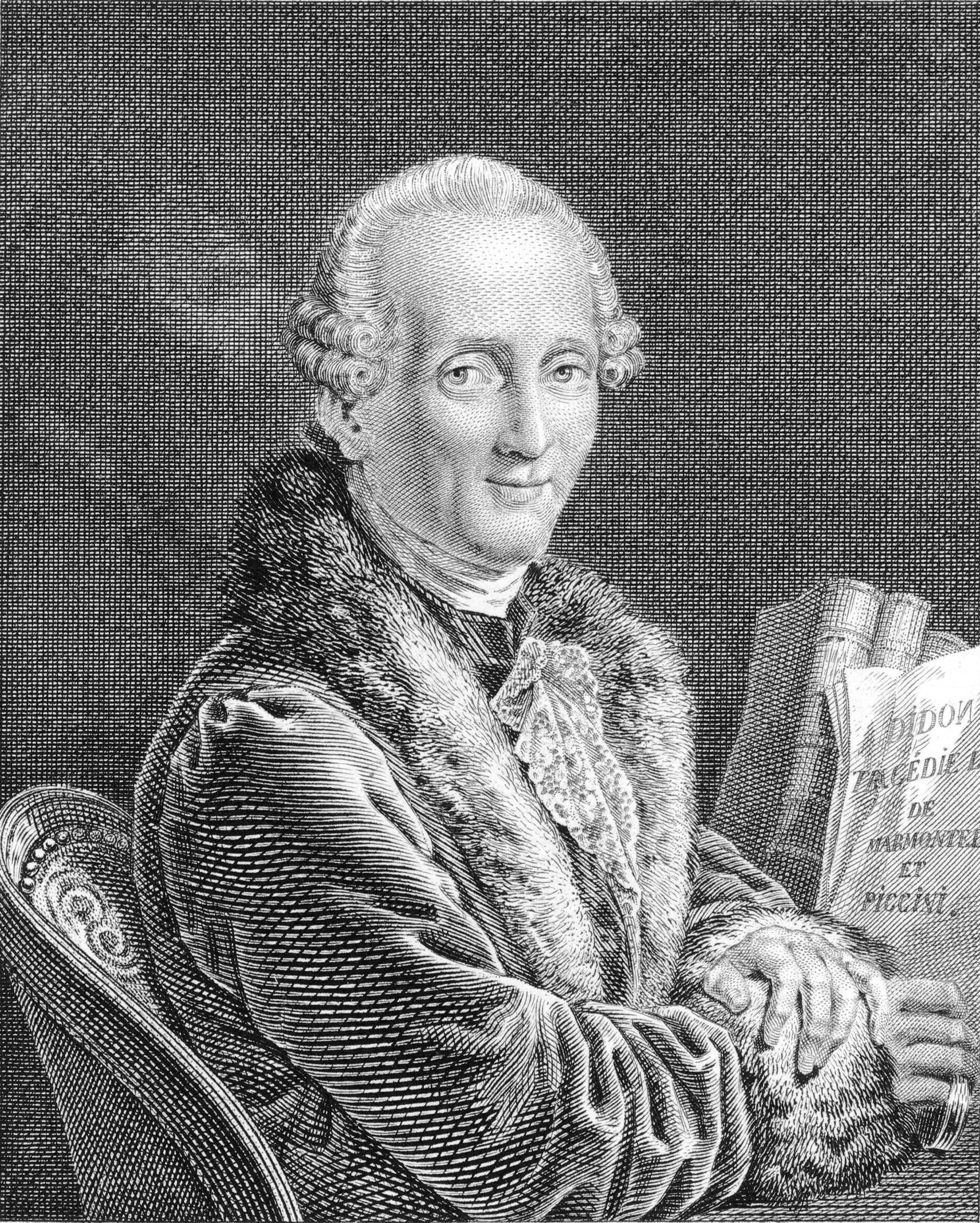
- Niccolò Piccinni, engraving by Hippolyte Pauquet
- Librettist: Jean-François Marmontel
- Language: French
- Based on: Homer's Odyssey
- Premiere: 2 November 1785; Fontainebleau

Pénélope is a French-language opera by the composer Niccolò Piccinni, first performed at Fontainebleau on 2 November 1785 in the presence of King Louis XVI and his queen Marie-Antoinette. It takes the form of a tragédie lyrique in three acts. The libretto, by Jean-François Marmontel, is based on the story of Odysseus (Ulysses) and Penelope in Homer's Odyssey. The opera transferred to the Académie Royale de Musique, Paris (the Paris Opera) on 6 December 1785, but it was not a success.

== Roles ==
Cast	Voice type	Premiere
Pénélope	soprano	Antoinette Saint-Huberty
Théone	soprano	Marie-Thérèse Davoux Maillard
Télémaque (Telemachus)	tenor	Étienne Lainez
Ulisse (Ulysses)	basse taille (bass-baritone)	Henri Larrivée
Laèrte (Laertes)	baritone	Louis-Claude-Armand Chardin ("Chardiny")
Eumée (Eumaeus)	haute-contre	Jean-Joseph Rousseau
Nésus	bass-baritone	Moreau
Minerve (the goddess Minerva)	soprano	Mlle Châteauvieux
Une coryphée	soprano	Mlle Buret
Chorus: Eight suitors of Penelope, people

== Sources ==
- (in French) Félix Clément and Pierre Larousse Dictionnaire des Opéras, p.523
- (in French) Original libretto at BNF Gallica
