= Pichegru Conspiracy =

Conspiracy concerning an overthrow of Napoleon Bonaparte

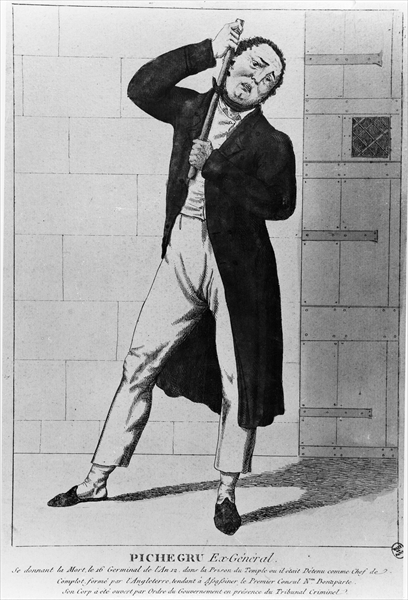
General Charles Pichegru strangling himself in the Temple Prison (engraving)

The Pichegru Conspiracy, otherwise known as the Cadoudal Affair was a conspiracy involving royalists Jean-Charles Pichegru and Georges Cadoudal who wished to overthrow Napoleon Bonaparte's military regime. They were apprehended and sentenced to death, but not before the rumors of their plot reached Napoleon. Bonaparte believed Louis Antoine, Duke of Enghien, was in contact with the conspirators and his fear of the loss of his power prompted the execution of the innocent Duke. The affair provoked the old aristocracy to oppose the regime as well as strengthening the influence of the Minister of Police, Joseph Fouché.

== The plot ==
Originally exiled from France for his loyalty to the royalists in the Coup of 18 Fructidor, Pichegru made contact with Cadoudal in London of 1803. Cadoudal had a bitter hatred for Napoleon because he was responsible for the murder of his dear friend Pierre Mercier and his brother Colonel Julien Cadoudal. He wanted revenge for not only the murders, but because he saw Napoleon's abuse of power and what it could accomplish. He proposed a plan to assassinate the First Consul. After the assassination, two men would control the armies and the capitol while waiting for Louis XVIII to return to France and take control as king. Pichegru was meant to be one of the two, the other being Jean Moreau, a military rival of Napoleon. Moreau, being influenced by the discord between his wife and Napoleon's family, was put in contact with Pichegru. But in January 1804 when the conspirators smuggled themselves from England into France, Moreau was appalled with the unorganized nature of their planning. Many of their associates were in prison and at this point, it seemed as if the police were letting Pichegru and Cadoudal continue in hopes to officially implicate Moreau.

== Arrest and trial ==
Eventually, all three men were taken by the French police. Moreau was arrested February 14, 1804, and then Pichegru two weeks later on February 28. Cadoudal was arrested on March 9. Cadoudal's confession revealed that the plan was more of a revolution than just an assassination attempt. Moreau had convinced them to wait for the arrival of a French prince in order to carry out the assassination and legitimize their revolution and the prince who would take control of it.

On April 5, 1804, Pichegru was found dead in his cell, strangled with his own tie. The incident is still a mystery and it is still debated whether it was a murder or a suicide. Cadoudal, Moreau and the rest of the conspirators were brought to trial a month later, on May 28, 1804. Moreau struck a deal with Napoleon and ended up being exiled to the United States while Cadoudal was executed on June 25, 1804.
