= Nephté =

Opera by Jean-Baptiste Lemoyne

Nephté is an opera by the French composer Jean-Baptiste Lemoyne, first performed at the Académie Royale de Musique (the Paris Opéra) on 15 December 1789. It takes the form of a tragédie lyrique in three acts. The libretto, by François-Benoît Hoffman, is set in Ancient Egypt but is based on the story of Camma, Queen of Galatia taken from the ancient historian Plutarch.

The plot concerns Nephté, Queen of Egypt, whose husband King Séthos has been murdered by his brother Pharès. The widowed queen seeks revenge with the help of the high priest Amédès. However, Pharès has the support of the army and aims to take the throne and to marry Nephté himself. He also threatens the life of Nephté's son. Eventually, Nephté agrees to marry Pharès but she poisons the wedding cup, killing both the usurper and herself, thereby allowing her son to succeed to the throne as king of Egypt.

== Background and composition ==
=== Libretto ===
==== Camma in Plutarch ====
Hoffman based Nephté on the story of Camma, Queen of Galatia, which occurs in Plutarch's essay "Virtues in Women" Hoffman summarised Plutarch thus:

Camma, daughter of Leonorius, married Silatus, King of Galatia. Sinorix, Silatus' kinsman, had him assassinated so he could seize his crown and his wife. As he was loved by the soldiers, he took the throne with ease; but Camma continued to maintain an inflexible resistance to him. Finally, the queen, abandoned by everyone, threatened by Sinorix, little respected by her rebellious people, was forced to give her hand in marriage to the murderer of her husband. But, faithful to her previous vows, and preserving in her heart as much love for Sinatus as horror for his murderer, she poisoned the wedding cup, and died with the usurper.

==== Thomas Corneille's Camma, Reine de Galatie ====
In his preface to the printed libretto, Hoffman noted that the story had been used before on the French stage. In 1661, Thomas Corneille (brother of the more famous Pierre) had presented his tragedy Camma, Reine de Galatie. However, Hoffman avoided using Corneille because, to suit the fashion of the times, Corneille had introduced love interest to the plot. The widowed queen is not devoted to her dead husband but in love with a young prince she wishes to make king in the usurper's place. Hoffman writes that he had preferred to "preserve the historical episode in all its purity", refusing such additions.

==== The Egyptian setting ====
The major change Hoffman made was to alter the names and setting. He moved the scene of the action to ancient Egypt (in "mythological times") "to introduce new costumes and new manners to the stage of the Opéra". Plutarch's Camma is renamed Nephté, Sinatus becomes Séthos and Sinorix becomes Pharès. Hoffman writes that he had not invented the name "Nephté". Citing the German theologian and antiquarian Paul Ernst Jablonski, he says that "Nephté" is a conflation of two Egyptian gods, Neith (the equivalent of the Roman Minerva) and Ptah (the Roman Vulcan), signifying "wisdom" and "courage". Hoffman was also struck by the similarities between the plot of the opera and the Egyptian myth of Isis and Osiris. The goddess Isis "was always faithful to Osiris, her brother and husband; she took vengeance on Typhon, Osiris' murderer, and saved the crown for her son Horus."

From the Dutch scholar Cornelius de Pauw, Hoffman took the idea that it was forbidden for women to inherit the throne of Egypt, an important plot point in the opera. He also researched details of Egyptian funerary rites in Herodotus and Diodorus Siculus.

=== Lemoyne and the Opéra management ===
Lemoyne spent a long time working on the score. There are references to its composition as early as November 1787. Antoine Dauvergne, of the Opéra management, complained that Lemoyne and his pupil, the leading soprano Antoinette Saint-Huberty, only liked operas with "plots concerning incest, poison or assassinations". The response of the Opéra committee to Nephté was more positive, their report describing the work as "one of the darkest and most beautiful, both in its libretto and its score".

=== Scenery ===
Hoffman also used his research into Egyptian history to provide detailed descriptions for the scenery, which was designed by Pierre-Adrien Pâris. Hoffman printed one such description in the stage directions for act 1 of Nephté:

The whole of the right-hand side of the theatre should represent an arid mountain, beneath which twelve crypts or sepulchral grottoes have been carved out of the rock. Each of these grottoes contains the tomb of one of the kings of Egypt and each is lit by a funeral lamp. Séthos' tomb is the first and appears the newest to be built. Four priests, robed in linen, are sitting on four stones placed at the four corners of the tomb. The left-hand side is occupied by the façade of the palace of Memphis. At the far edge of the mountain rises the Great Temple of Osiris (or the Sun), of which only the doors are visible. This temple occupies only part of the background so that in the gap between it and the caves we can see in the distance some of the fertile fields which border the Nile, and one of the pyramids, whose top is lost on the horizon. An avenue of colossal sphinxes leads from the temple to the palace portico. The space remaining between the sphinxes and the caves is planted with cypress trees. Day has not yet broken and the theatre seems illuminated only by the light from the funeral lamps.

== Performance history ==
Nephté was first performed at the Académie Royale de Musique (the Paris Opéra) on 15 December 1789. The young soprano Madame Maillard took the title role, replacing Lemoyne's protégée Antoinette Saint-Huberty. According to some sources, the premiere was so successful, Lemoyne was called onto the stage after the final curtain, the first time this had happened in the history of the Opéra. Nephté ran for 39 performances, the last given on 18 March 1792. Hoffman angrily claimed that the withdrawal of the work was to prevent him receiving the pension which would have been his due had it reached 40 performances. In support of Hoffman's argument is the fact that the season did not end until 27 March, allowing time for another staging. Hoffman had also dedicated the libretto to Antoinette Saint-Huberty, who was disliked by the Opéra management, and had refused to add dance divertissements to Nephté on artistic grounds, against the recommendations of the Opéra board. On the other hand, ticket receipts had recently been falling off as the opera was losing popularity in spite of the good press it enjoyed.

== Reception ==
Reviews were generally favourable, with praise for the music, the scenery and the singing of Maillard and Lainez. The Correspondence littéraire was more guarded, liking some aspects, but finding the work too static and emotionally uniform. It suggested this might have been remedied had Nephté's motivation been changed: instead of guessing Pharès' guilt almost from the beginning, she might have only slowly come to realise the truth, possibly after being infatuated with the usurper. Other critics complained about the lack of the dance—customary in French opera—, which in their opinion made the work monotonous. In a later assessment, Jean-François de La Harpe criticised the music for being "harsh and loud, with the exception of a few pieces, as one would expect from a disciple of Gluck".

== The work ==
Nephté appeared when the French musical world was still divided between the supporters of two foreign composers who had made their mark on Paris in the 1770s: the German Christoph Willibald Gluck, famous for his operatic reforms, and Niccolò Piccinni, representative of the Italian school. This caused difficulties for native French composers, such as Lemoyne, who found it hard to devise a style of their own. Lemoyne had promoted himself as a member of the Gluckist camp with his first opera for Paris, Électre, in 1782. However, it failed and Gluck refused to accept Lemoyne as his disciple, so for his next work, Phèdre (1786), Lemoyne tried a more Italianate style in the manner of Piccinni. Nephté was regarded as an opera in the Gluckian vein, with its emphasis on "majesty and sobriety" and its simple, direct plot (there are only four main characters). It was dedicated to Gluck's champion, Queen Marie Antoinette. On the other hand, some features, such as the lavish and exotic scenery were not part of the Gluckian aesthetic.

Nephté was premiered towards the beginning of the French Revolution. The exotic subject was seemingly at a safe remove from the political situation of 1789, but the scholar Mark Darlow believes that the opera's themes of royal legitimacy and usurpation and concern for the future survival of a dynasty would have had contemporary resonance.

== Roles ==
Roles, voice types, premiere cast
Cast	Voice type	Premiere cast, 15 December 1789
Nephté	soprano	Marie Thérèse Davoux Maillard
Pharès	tenor	Étienne Lainez
Amédès	basse-taille (bass-baritone)	Martin-Joseph Adrien
Chemmis	basse-taille (bass-baritone)	Dufresne
Maiden of the Temple of Osiris	soprano	Marie-Wilhelmine de Rousselois
Priests of the tombs	basses-tailles (bass-baritones)	Châteaufort, Poussez, Legrand; Pierre-Charles Le Roux (the younger),
High Priest of Hymen	basse-taille (bass-baritone)	Châteaufort
Nephté's infant son	mute role	Mlle. Rosette
Chorus: 25 young maidens of the Temple of Osiris; grandees of the state, priests, Nephté's waiting women; soldiers, Egyptian people

== Synopsis ==
Setting: the palace of the Kings of Memphis

=== Act 1 ===
Scene: the tombs of the kings of Egypt
It is just before dawn. Four priests are mourning the death of King Séthos. They wish he had died an honourable death in battle, but the terrible truth is that he was murdered by the brother he loved. Dawn breaks as Queen Nephté arrives with her young son to pay tribute to her dead husband. Nephté says that it is only the thought of her child which keeps her alive, otherwise life is barren for her without Séthos. She asks the priests to reveal who killed him. When the arrival of her brother-in-law Pharès is announced, the priests are horrified and Nephté begins to suspect he is the murderer. Pharès tries to flatter Nephté. He also claims it was Séthos' dying wish that he should become her new husband. Nephté admits this is true but she thinks it wrong to talk of marriage while Séthos is still unavenged. However, Pharès seems reluctant to search for the assassin, but at Nephté's insistence he finally agrees to swear on his brother's tomb that he will bring the criminal to justice. The priests are shocked at this sacrilege. After Pharès has left, the chief priest Amédès reveals what Nephté has suspected: Pharès is the killer. Nephté demands vengeance, but she also fears for her son's safety. Amédès agrees to hide the boy among the tombs. He says it will be difficult to get revenge because Pharès is both respected and feared by the Egyptians. The temple opens as the statesmen and common people arrive for Séthos' funeral rites. The temple girls reveal that Sethos is now an immortal in heaven. Nephté implores the Egyptians to avenge her husband. They swear on the altar to do so. Amédès says he will reveal the murderer's name that evening.

=== Act 2 ===
Scene: the palace hall with the throne of the kings of Egypt
Pharès is angry that Amédès might reveal his guilt. Chemmis says that the people still love him and to cement his position as new king, he should be crowned and marry Nephté that very day. But Pharès suggests that he will only be safe when Amédès is dead and Chemmis promises to kill him if he reveals the secret. The statesmen, heads of the army and soldiers march in. Pharès tells them that the peoples of Asia are in revolt against Egypt after Séthos' death; it is vital that Egypt has a commander for its army. The soldiers acclaim Pharès as their new general. Their shouts of congratulation are interrupted by the arrival of Nephté. Nephté is outraged at Pharès' behaviour but says that Amédès will soon reveal the killer's name. The soldiers, who have not heard this conversation, urge Pharès and Nephté to marry. Pharès asks where Nephté's son is; he should be brought up in the palace in the view of his people. He sends soldiers to search for the boy. He leaves with the soldiers, promising them that the military campaign will begin at dawn. Alone with her waiting women, Nephté says she can see no escape from her predicament: if she seeks revenge, her son's life will be in danger; if she does not, justice will not be done and she will be a criminal. Her waiting women try to comfort her, but Nephté asks to be alone. Amédès now enters, shadowed by Chemmis. Amédès tells Nephté he is in danger and the gods seem to have abandoned them, but the priests will defend her son to the death. Chemmis emerges and threatens Amédès but the priest says he is willing to sacrifice his life. However, Nephté vows to die in his place to secure revenge for her husband. News comes that the soldiers have found her son's hiding place. The people arrive and beg Nephté to marry Pharès. Nephté finally agrees.In an aside, she reveals she has a secret plan.

=== Act 3 ===
Scene: the Temple of Osiris (or the Sun), with an altar in the middle
Nephté enters alone and calls on the gods to help her carry out her plan. Soon she will die but her son will be saved. She reveals nothing of this to Amédès, who is amazed she has agreed to marry Pharès. Amédès is prepared to risk his life by naming Pharès as the murderer rather than let the wedding go ahead. The priests, soldiers and people enter for the ceremony. Nephté sees her son amid the procession. Pharès is pleased to find Nephté already at the temple; she promises to be faithful to him unto death. The ceremony takes place and Nephté and Pharès both drink from the wedding cup. In an aside, Nephté reveals she has poisoned it. Amédès enters and announces that Séthos' murderer is Pharès. Amédès is about to stab Pharès when Nephté halts him. She tells everyone Séthos is already avenged: she has poisoned Pharès and herself. The enraged Pharès is led away to die offstage. Nephté dies after she has had her son proclaimed the new king of Egypt.
