= Phèdre (opera) =

Opera Tragedy

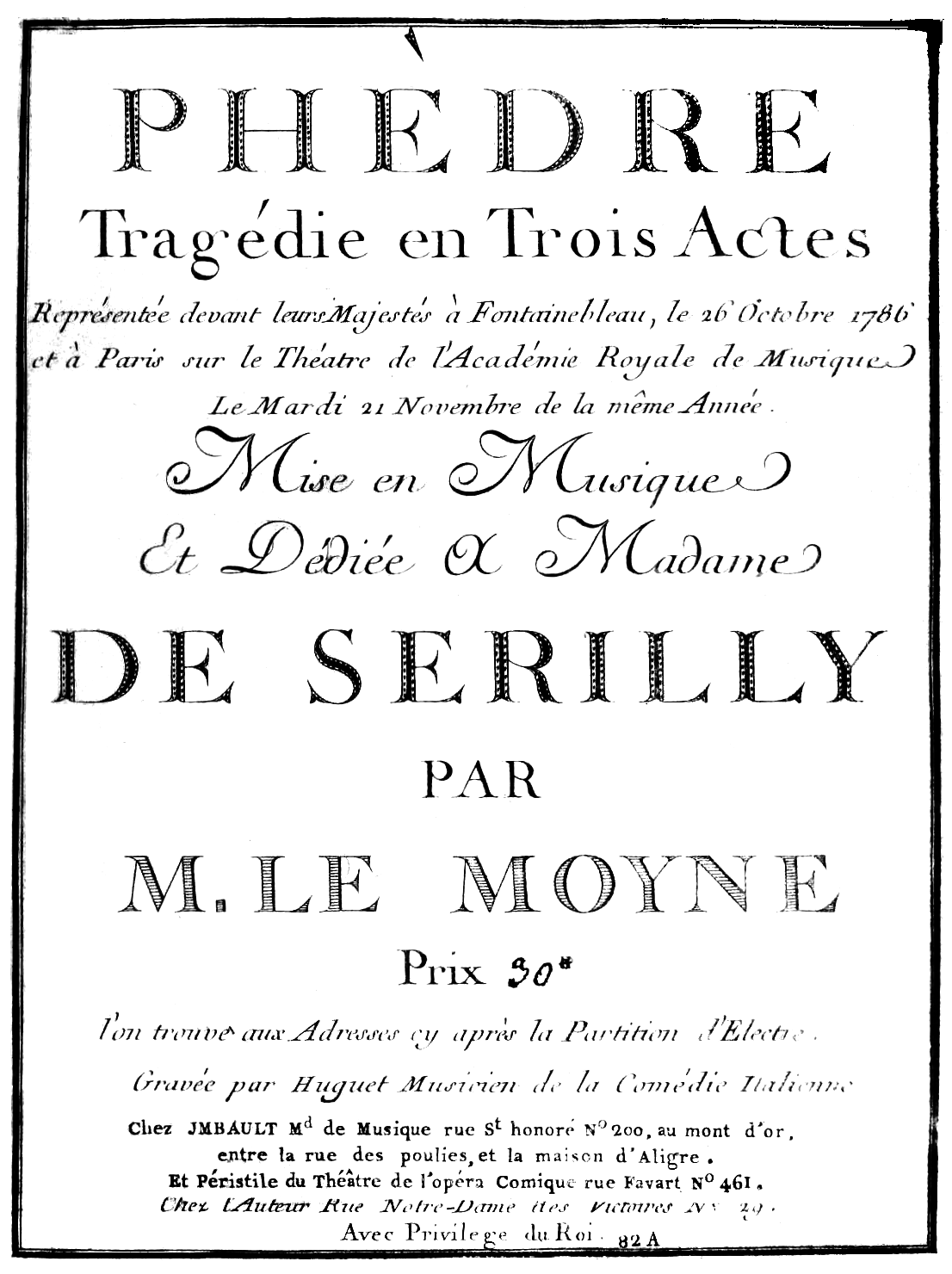
Phèdre, title page of the score, 1786

Phèdre (French pronunciation: [fɛdʁ], Phaedra) is an opera by the French composer Jean-Baptiste Lemoyne, first performed at Fontainebleau on 26 October 1786. It takes the form of a tragédie mise en musique in three acts. The libretto by François-Benoît Hoffman is based on the Greek myth of the obsessive love of Phaedra for her stepson Hippolytus.

== Roles ==
Cast	Voice type	Premiere cast
Phèdre (Phaedra)	soprano	Antoinette Saint-Huberty
Thésée (Theseus)	basse-taille (bass-baritone)	Auguste-Athanase (Augustin) Chéron
Hippolite (Hippolytus)	haute-contre	Jean-Joseph Rousseau
Œnone	soprano	Adelaïde Gavaudan, cadette (the Younger)
La grande prêtresse de Vénus (the high priestess of Venus)	soprano	Anne-Marie Jeanne Gavaudan, l'ainée (the Elder)
Un grand de l'état (an important statesman)	baritone	Louis-Claude-Armand Chardin ("Chardiny")
Un chasseur (a huntsman)	bass-baritone	Moreau

== Recordings ==
- Concert de la Loge Olympique, Julien Chauvin
- Orfeo Orchestra Purcell Choir, György Vashegyi. Palazzeto Bru Zane (2020)

== Sources ==
- (in French) Original libretto on BNF Gallica
