= Jean-Baptiste Lemoyne (composer) =

French composer (1751–1796)

Jean-Baptiste Le Moyne, or Lemoyne, (French pronunciation: [ʒɑ̃ batist ləmwan]; 3 April 1751 – 30 December 1796) was a French composer, chiefly of operas. Born in Eymet, Dordogne, he first worked as a musician in Berlin and Warsaw, where in 1775 he produced his first opera, Le bouquet de Colette, starring his pupil Antoinette de Saint-Huberty (née Clavel). He returned to France and wrote the tragic opera Électre, which received its premiere in 1782. Lemoyne claimed his music was following the example of Christoph Willibald Gluck, then the greatest influence on French opera, but when Électre failed, Gluck rejected any association with the younger composer. Lemoyne turned to Gluck's rivals, Niccolò Piccinni and Antonio Sacchini, as musical models for his next two tragedies, Phèdre (1786) and the Egyptian-set Nephté (1789), which had more success. His later operas are less important. He died in Paris.

== Operas ==
- Le bouquet de Colette, premiered 1775 in Warsaw
- Électre, tragédie lyrique in three acts, libretto by Nicolas-François Guillard, premiered 2 July 1782 at the Académie Royale de Musique (Paris opera)
- Phèdre, a tragédie mise en musique in three acts, libretto by François-Benoît Hoffman, premiered 26 October 1786 at Fontainebleau
- Nadir, ou Le dormeur éveillé, 1787, unstaged "for purely financial reasons"
- Les prétendus, comédie lyrique in two acts in verse, libretto by Rochon de Chabannes, premiered 2 June 1789 at the Académie Royale de Musique (Paris Opera)
- Nephté, tragédie lyrique in three acts, libretto by François-Benoît Hoffman, premiered 15 December 1789 at the Académie Royale de Musique (Paris Opera)
- Les pommiers et le moulin, comédie lyrique, premiered 22 January 1790 at the Académie Royale de Musique (Paris Opera)
- Louis IX en Égypte, opéra, libretto by Guillard and Andrieux, premiered 15 June 1790
- Elfrida, libretto by Guillard, premiered 17 December 1791 at the Théâtre des Italiens (the Opéra-Comique)
- Miltiade à Marathon, opéra, libretto by Guillard, premiered 5 November 1793 at the Paris Opera
- Toute la Grèce, ou Ce que peut la liberté, tableau patriotique, libretto by Beffroy de Reigny, premiered 5 January 1794 at the Paris Opera
- Le compère Luc, ou Les dangers de l'ivrognerie, opera in two acts, premiered 19 February 1794 at the Théâtre Feydeau
- Les vrais sans-culottes, ou L'hospitalité républicaine, tableau patriotique avec chants, libretto by Rézicourt, premiered 12 May 1794
- Le mensonge officieux, comédie in one act, libretto by Nicolas-Julien Forgeot, premiered 13 March 1795 at the Cirque National

== Sources ==
- Amanda Holden, ed. (1993). The Viking Opera Guide. Viking.
- Darlow, Mark (2012). Staging the French Revolution: Cultural Politics and the Paris Opera, 1789–1794. Oxford University Press USA.
- Kennedy, Emmet (1996). Theatre, Opera, and Audiences in Revolutionary Paris: Analysis and Repertory. Greenwood Publishing.
- Rushton, Julian. "Jean-Baptiste Lemoyne". The New Grove Dictionary of Music and Musicians.
- Tissier, André (2002). Les spectacles de Paris pendant la Révolution (in French). Vol. 2. Librairie Droz.
