= Les Planches-près-Arbois =

Commune in Bourgogne-Franche-Comté, France

- Commune
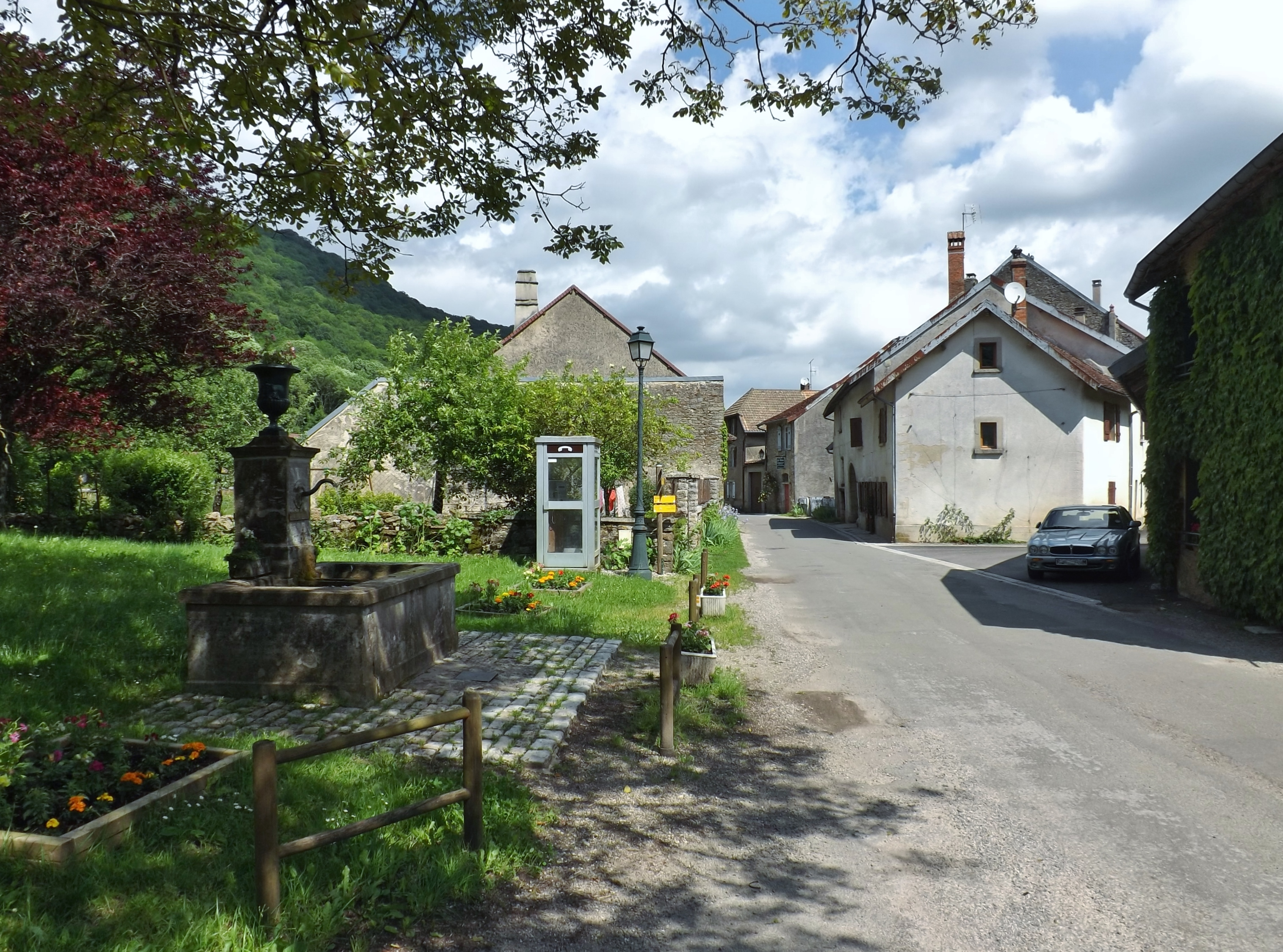
- A view within Les Planches-près-Arbois
- Location of Les Planches-près-Arbois
- Location within France Location within Bourgogne-Franche-Comté
- Coordinates: 46°52′46″N 5°48′27″E
- Country: France
- Region: Bourgogne-Franche-Comté
- Department: Jura
- Arrondissement: Dole
- Canton: Arbois
- Intercommunality: CC Arbois, Poligny, Salins, Cœur du Jura

Government
  - Mayor (2020–2026): François Perrin
- Area^{1}: 1.39 km^{2} (0.54 sq mi)
- Highest elevation: 571 m (1,873 ft)
- Lowest elevation: 320 m (1,050 ft)
- Population (2023): 88
  - Density: 63/km^{2} (160/sq mi)
- Time zone: UTC+01:00 (CET)
  - Summer (DST): UTC+02:00 (CEST)
- INSEE/Postal code: 39425 /39600
- ^{1} French Land Register data, which excludes lakes, ponds, glaciers > 1 km^{2} (0.386 sq mi or 247 acres) and river estuaries.

Les Planches-près-Arbois (French pronunciation: [le plɑ̃ʃ pʁɛ aʁbwa], literally Les Planches near Arbois; Arpitan: Lës Plintsës-près-d'Arbois) is a commune in the Jura department in Bourgogne-Franche-Comté in eastern France.

== Population ==
Historical population
Year	Pop.	±% p.a.
1968	87	—
1975	65	−4.08%
1982	75	+2.07%
1990	67	−1.40%
1999	79	+1.85%
2007	93	+2.06%
2012	101	+1.66%
2017	96	−1.01%
2023	88	−1.44%
Source: INSEE

== Geography ==
The village is located in the Reculée des Planches, a gorge which is home to a series of impressive caves and ends in abrupt, limestone cliffs and scree slopes, making it one of the Jura's most prized natural sites. The whole of the gorge is a protected, natural area and also a Natura 2000 site.

The landscapes and the viewpoints are protected. This protection strictly limits any expansion of the village but seems to correspond to the current inhabitants' desire to treasure their shared heritage.

== See also ==
- Communes of the Jura department
