= Jean Gabriel Maurice Rocques =

French politician (1761–1841)

Jean Gabriel Maurice Rocques, comte de Montgaillard (November 16, 1761 – February 8, 1841) was a French political agent of the Revolution and First Empire era.

== Biography ==
=== Early life ===
Born at Montgaillard-Lauragais, near Villefranche-de-Lauragais (Haute-Garonne), to a family of the minor noblesse, he was educated at the military school of Sorze, where he attracted the notice of King Louis XVI's younger brother, the Comte de Provence.

After serving for some years in the French Caribbean, Maurice de Rocques returned to France and settled in Paris as a secret diplomatic agent in 1789, and, although he was an émigré to Great Britain after the 10th of August 1792 attack on the Tuileries, he returned six weeks later to Paris, where his safety during the Reign of Terror was most probably purchased by services to the French Republic.

=== With the comte de Provence ===
He was again serving the Bourbon princes when he met Emperor Francis II at Ypres (in the Austrian Netherlands) in 1794 and met with William Pitt the Younger in London, where he published his État de la France au mois de mai 1794, predicting the fall of Maximilien Robespierre and the start of the Thermidorian Reaction.

Rocques was also employed by Louis XVIII to secure Habsburg aid in the release of Louis XVI's only surviving child, Madame Royale (Princess Marie-Thérèse-Charlotte), from the Temple Prison in Paris; Rocques also drafted the proposition made by the prince to General Charles Pichegru in exchange for his betrayal of the Republic.

=== Support for Bonaparte ===
In June 1796, Rocques made a journey to the Italian Peninsula in the hope of opening direct relations with Napoleon Bonaparte. On his return to the princes at Blankenburg am Harz, he was regarded with suspicion, and he departed for Paris to await events. He is thought to have indicated to the French Directory the possession by the Comte d'Antraigues, an agent of Louis XVIII, of documents compromising Pichegru. In April 1798 he surrendered to Claude Roberjot, at the time envoy of the Directory to the government of Hamburg (nominally, to the Hanseatic League), other papers relating to the matter.

He followed Roberjot to the Batavian Republic, and there wrote a memorandum to prove that the only hope for France lay in the immediate return of Bonaparte from the Egyptian campaign, followed by assumption of the supreme power. This note reached Bonaparte in Alexandria, after passing through of Berlin and Constantinople.

After the 18 Brumaire coup, when he returned to Paris in the hope of recognition by Napoleon, Rocques was imprisoned, and on his release he was kept under police supervision. Napoleon, who appreciated his real insight into European politics and his extraordinary knowledge of European courts, attached him to the Empire's secret cabinet in spite of his past intrigues.

=== Later diplomatic activities ===
He received a salary of 14,000 francs, reduced later to 6,000, for reports on political questions for Napoleon's use, and for pamphlets written to help the imperial policy. He tried to dissuade Napoleon from his Habsburg matrimony plans with Marie Louise and the invasion of Russia, and warned against expansion of the Empire beyond the Rhine, the Alps and the Pyrenees.

The Bourbon Restoration made no change in his position: he was maintained as confidential adviser on foreign and home politics, and gave apt advice to the new government. His career ended after the July Revolution, and he died in obscurity at Chaillot.
