= Montgaillard-Lauragais =

- Commune
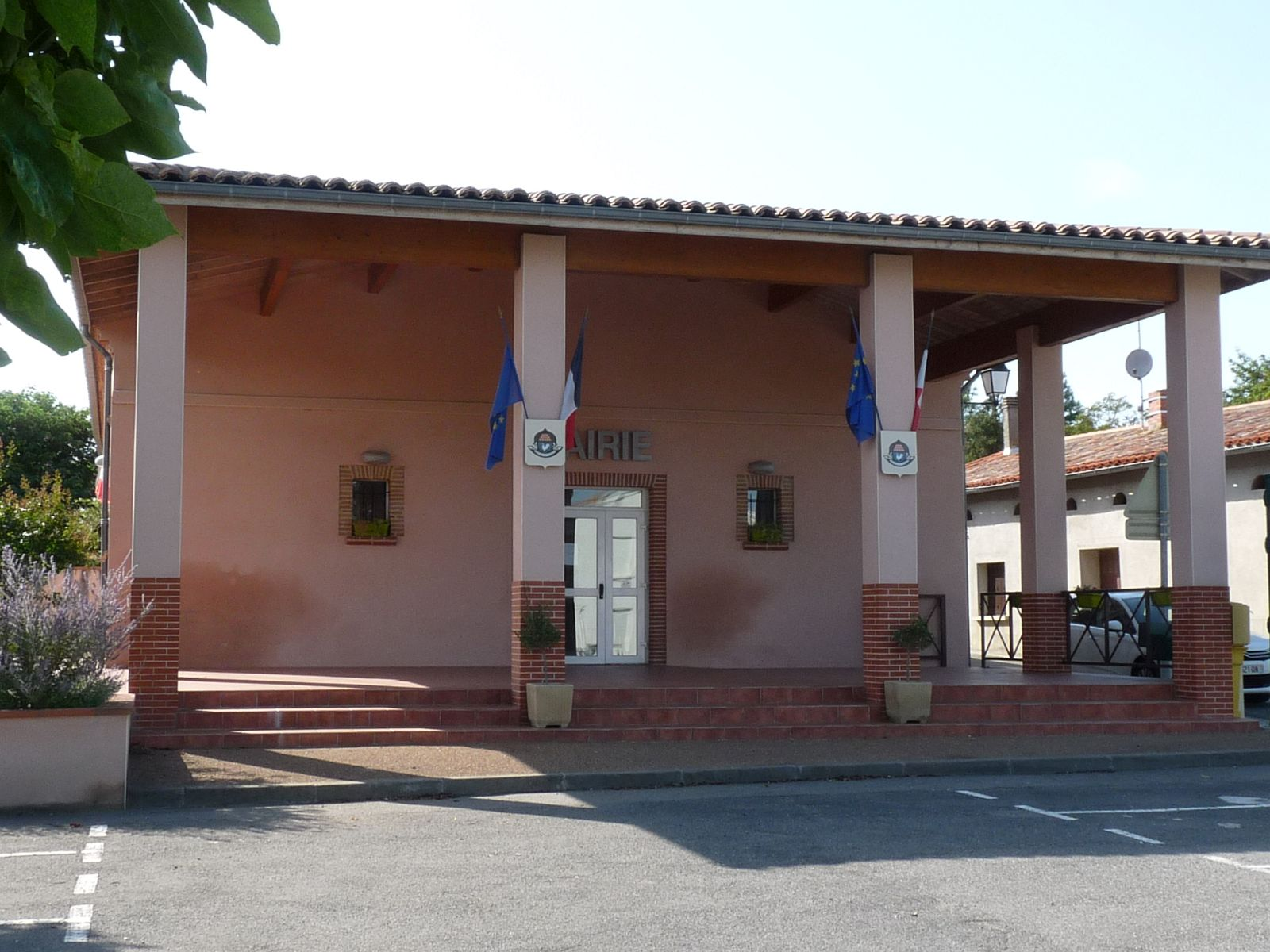
- The town hall in Montgaillard-Lauragais

- Coat of arms
- Location of Montgaillard-Lauragais
- Location within France Location within Occitanie
- Coordinates: 43°25′57″N 1°41′57″E
- Country: France
- Region: Occitania
- Department: Haute-Garonne
- Arrondissement: Toulouse
- Canton: Revel

Government
  - Mayor (2020–2026): Bruno Mouyon
- Area^{1}: 11.12 km^{2} (4.29 sq mi)
- Elevation: 250 m (820 ft)
- Highest elevation: 259 m (850 ft)
- Lowest elevation: 164 m (538 ft)
- Population (2023): 683
  - Density: 61.4/km^{2} (159/sq mi)
- Time zone: UTC+01:00 (CET)
  - Summer (DST): UTC+02:00 (CEST)
- INSEE/Postal code: 31377 /31290
- ^{1} French Land Register data, which excludes lakes, ponds, glaciers > 1 km^{2} (0.386 sq mi or 247 acres) and river estuaries.

Montgaillard-Lauragais (French pronunciation: [mɔ̃gajaʁ loʁaɡɛ]; Occitan: Montgalhard de Lauragués) is a commune in the Haute-Garonne department of southwestern France.

== Population ==
Historical population
Year	Pop.	±% p.a.
1968	321	—
1975	434	+4.40%
1982	459	+0.80%
1990	528	+1.77%
1999	547	+0.39%
2007	649	+2.16%
2012	642	−0.22%
2017	743	+2.97%
2023	683	−1.39%
Source: INSEE

== See also ==
- Communes of the Haute-Garonne department
