= Amadis (disambiguation) =

Amadis usually refers to the romance novel Amadis de Gaula.

Amadis may also refer to:

- Amadis of Greece, 1530 sequel by Feliciano de Silva to the novel Amadis de Gaula
- Amadis (Lully), 1684 opera by Jean-Baptiste Lully
- Amadis de Grèce, 1699 opera by André Cardinal Destouches
- Amadigi di Gaula, 1715 opera by George Frideric Handel
- Amadis de Gaule (La Borde and Berton), 1771 opera by Jean-Benjamin de La Borde and Pierre Montan Berton
- Amadis de Gaule (J. C. Bach), 1779 opera by Johann Christian Bach
- Amadis (Massenet), 1922 opera by Jules Massenet

== See also ==
- L'Amadigi, 1560 epic poem by Tasso
