= Adèle de Ponthieu =

Adèle de Ponthieu is the name of several operas set to the same libretto:

- Adèle de Ponthieu (1772) by Jean-Benjamin de La Borde and Pierre Montan Berton
- Adèle de Ponthieu (1773) by Joseph Starzer
- Adèle de Ponthieu (1781) by Niccolò Piccinni
- Adèle de Ponthieu (1887) by André Wormser
