= Lobera =

Lobera or La Lobera is the Spanish word for "wolves' lair", “wolf trap”, "wolf pack" or "wolf woman." It is equivalent to Portuguese Lobeira and Italian Luparia.

It may refer to:

== Places ==
- Lobera de Onsella
- Lobera de la Vega
- Lobera de Orense
- Cave on San Pedro Nolasco Island
- "Wolf's Lair," or La Lobera, isolation blockhouse in Callao Naval Base prison in Peru housing inmates such as Shining Path terrorist leader Abimael Guzman.

== People ==
- Lobera, a common Spanish surname
  - Pedro Mariño de Lobera
- Ana María García, la Lobera, who appeared before the Inquisition of Toledo in 1648 accused of controlling seven demonic wolves

== Other ==
- a wolf trap, funnel-like walls leading to a pit with stakes for hunting wolves in Spain
- Wolf-slayer Lobera (sword)
- Digitalis purpurea
- Wolf apple Solanum lycocarpum common in the Brazilian savanna.
