= Lobeira =

Lobeira may refer to:

- Lobeira, Spain, a town in Galicia. The Spanish name is Lobera ("wolves' lair", "wolf trap", "wolf woman").
- João de Lobeira (c.1233–1285), medieval Portuguese romance writer, author of Amadis de Gaul
- Vasco de Lobeira, soldier, author of Amadis de Gaul in one source
- Roberta Lobeira Alanís, Mexican visual artist
- Disocactus or Lobeira, a cactus genus
- Solanum lycocarpum, or lobeira, a species of flowering shrub. The plant is called lobeira ("Wolf's Plant") or fruta-do-lobo ("Wolf's Fruit") in Portuguese.

== See also ==
- Lupăria (disambiguation)
- Lobería, town in Buenos Aires Province, Argentina
