= Jean-Paul-André Razins de Saint-Marc =

French playwright (1728–1818)

Jean-Paul-André des Razins
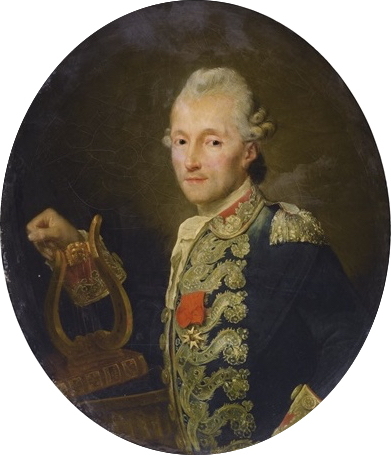
- Born: 29 November 1728; Château des Razins in Saint-Selve
- Died: 11 September 1818 (aged 89); Bordeaux
- Occupations: Playwright, librettist

Jean-Paul-André des Razins, marquis de Saint-Marc, (29 November 1728 – 11 September 1818) was an 18th-century French playwright and librettist.

A former officer of the French Guards Regiment, Saint-Marc wrote the libretto for Adèle de Ponthieu, a 1772 opera by Jean-Benjamin de La Borde and Pierre Montan Berton, and a 1781 opera by Niccolò Piccinni. He wrote several opéra comique librettos and numerous pieces of fleeting poetry.

In 1778, attending in Paris the famous presentation of Irène, after which the bust of Voltaire was crowned, Saint-Marc improvised this quatrain which made him famous:

Voltaire, reçois la couronne
Que l’on vient de te présenter;
II est beau de la mériter,
Quand c’est la France qui la donne!

Voltaire, receive the crown
That one just presented to you;
It is beautiful to deserve it,
When it is France who gives it!

Saint-Marc was a member of the Académie de Bordeaux. The mansion in the city where he lived and died was registered as Monument historique 23 July 1921.

== Sources ==
- Actes de l’Académie nationale des sciences, belles-lettres et arts de Bordeaux, Paris, E. Dentu, 1880, p. 39.
