= Amadís de Gaula =

Iberian chivalric romance

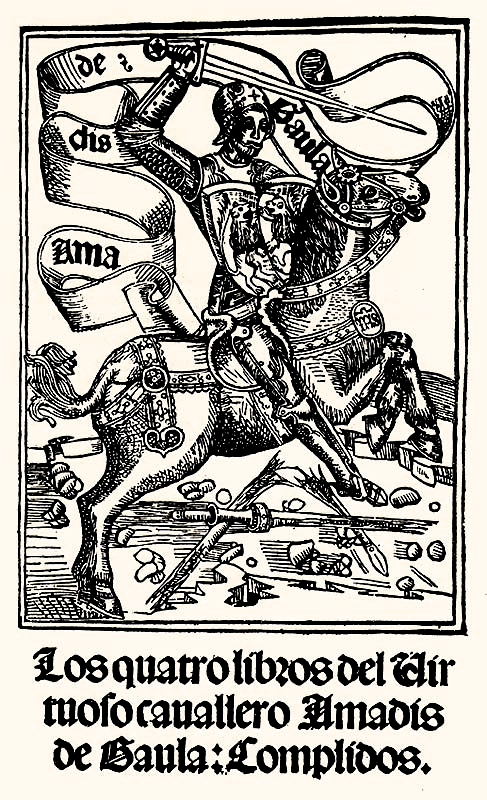
- First printed Spanish edition of Amadis de Gaula, Zaragoza, 1508
- Author: Garci Rodríguez de Montalvo
- Original title: Amadís de Gaula
- Language: Early Modern Spanish
- Genre: Chivalric romance
- Publication date: Before 1508
- Publication place: Iberian Peninsula (Spain and Portugal)
- English publication date: 1590
- Followed by: Las sergas de Esplandián

Amadís de Gaula (in English Amadis of Gaul; Spanish: Amadís de Gaula, IPA: [amaˈðis de ˈɣawla]; Portuguese: Amadis de Gaula, IPA: [ɐmɐˈdiʒ ðɨ ˈɣawlɐ]) is a landmark chivalric romance first composed in Spain or Portugal. The narrative originates in the late post-Arthurian genre and was likely based on French sources. The earliest version(s) may have been written in an unidentified location on the Iberian Peninsula in the early 14th century as it was certainly known to the Castilian statesman, poet and chancellor Pero López de Ayala, as well as Castilian poet Pero Ferrús. The Amadís is mentioned by the Spanish priest and confessor to Maria of Portugal, Queen of Castile Juan García de Castrojeriz in a document dated between 1342 and 1348.

The earliest surviving print edition of the text was compiled by Garci Rodríguez de Montalvo and published in four volumes in Zaragoza, Spain, in 1508. It was written in Spanish. There were likely earlier printed editions, which are now lost. Fragments of a manuscript of Book III dating from the first quarter of the 15th century, discovered in a bookbinding (now in The Bancroft Library, University of California, Berkeley) show that, in addition to making amendments, Montalvo also made an abbreviation to the older text. In the introduction to his publication, Montalvo explains that he edited the first three volumes from texts in circulation since the 14th century and added a fourth volume not previously published in book form. He later also published a sequel to the romance under the title Las sergas de Esplandián, which he claimed was discovered in a chest buried in Constantinople and transported to Spain by a Hungarian merchant (the famous motif of the found manuscript).

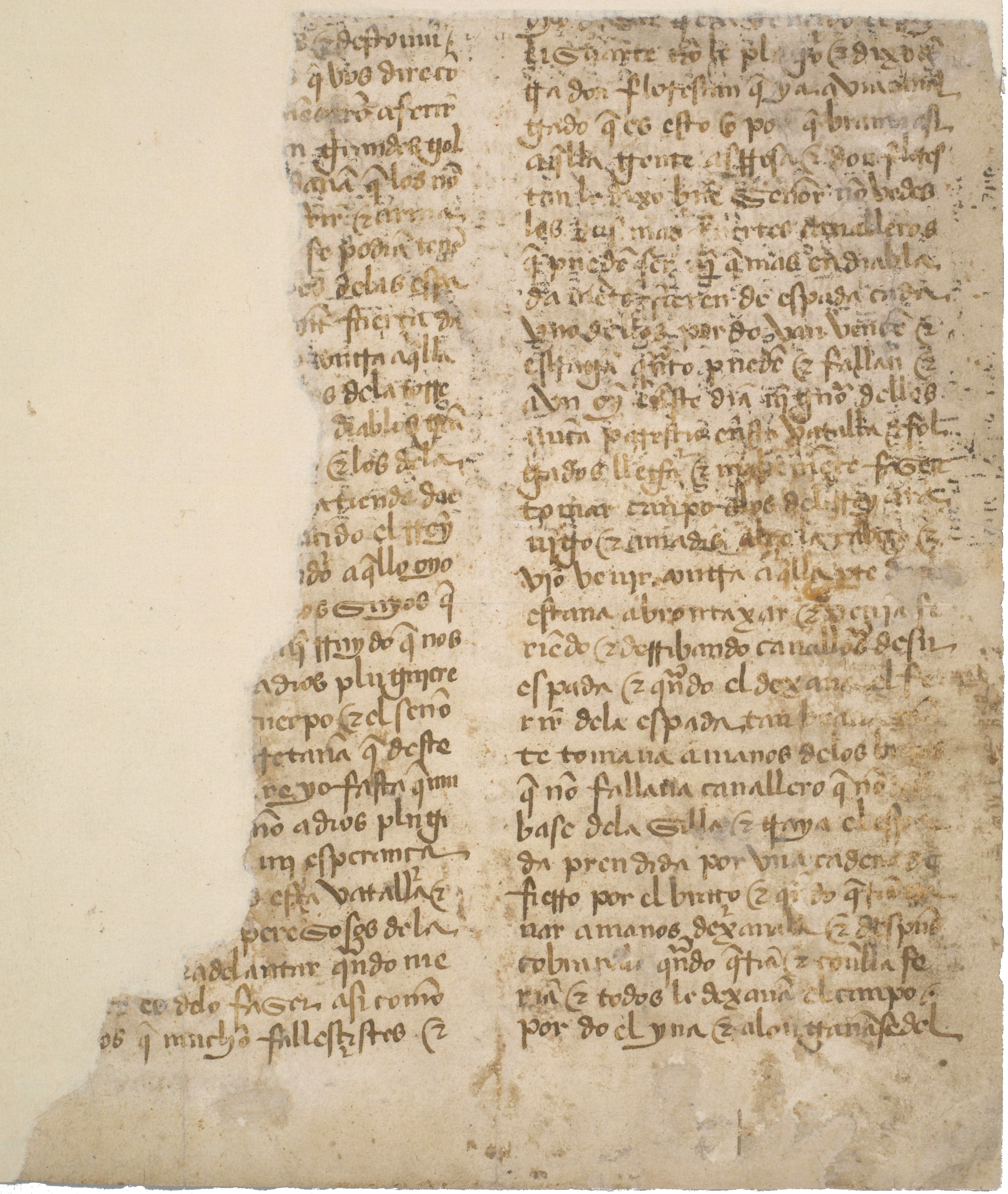
Fragment of manuscript of Book III of the Amadís, The Bancroft Library, UC Berkeley

In the Portuguese Chronicle by Gomes Eanes de Zurara (1454), Amadis is attributed to the Portuguese writer Vasco de Lobeira (died in 1403). Other traditional sources claim that the work was first put into prose by a Portuguese troubadour João de Lobeira (c. 1233–1285). No printed principal version in Portuguese is known. A more recent source attributes Amadis to Henry of Castile on the basis of supposed links between his biography and certain events in Amadis. The inspiration for the romance may have been the forbidden marriage of Infanta Constanza of Aragon with Henry in 1260 (see Don Juan Manuel's Libro de las tres razones of 1335) which is mirrored in the plot line of the forbidden marriage between Oriana and Amadis.

Many translations of Amadís de Gaula were produced already in the first century of its publication including into Hebrew, French, Italian, Dutch, German and English and remained for several centuries in Europe an important reference point in courtly, cultural, and social matters. It was the favorite book of the fictional titular character in Don Quixote by Miguel de Cervantes.

== Plot ==
The story narrates the star-crossed love of King Perión of Gaula and Elisena of England, resulting in the secret birth of Amadís. The place called Gaula is a fictional kingdom within Brittany. It has in the past been identified with Wales or France, but it is best understood as a completely legendary place. Abandoned at birth on a raft in England, the child is raised by the knight Gandales in Scotland and investigates his origins through fantastic adventures.

He is persecuted by the wizard Arcaláus, but protected by Urganda la Desconocida (Urganda the Unknown or Unrecognized), an ambiguous priestess with magical powers and a talent for prophecy. Knighted by his father King Perión, Amadís overcomes the challenges of the enchanted Ínsola Firme (a sort of peninsula), including passing through the Arch of Faithful Lovers.

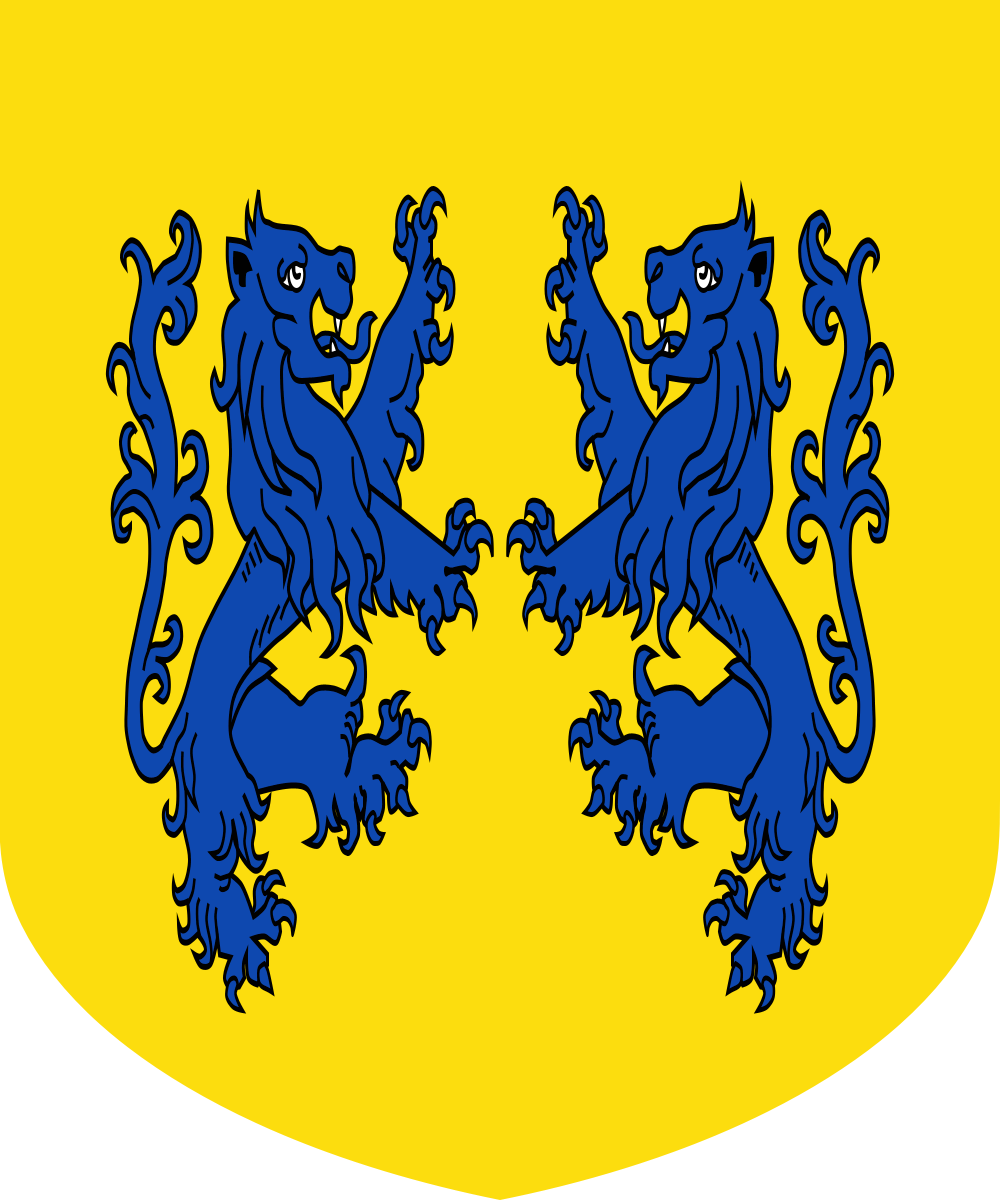
Coat of arms of Amadis: On a field or, two lions combatant azure

Despite Amadís' celebrated fidelity, his childhood sweetheart, Oriana, heiress to the throne of Great Britain, becomes jealous of a rival princess and sends a letter to chastise Amadís. The knight changes his name to Beltenebros and indulges in a long period of madness on the isolated Peña Pobre (Poor Peak or Mountain).

He recovers his senses only when Oriana sends her maid to retrieve him. He then helps Oriana's father, Lisuarte, repel invaders. A short time later he and Oriana scandalously consummate their love. Their son Esplandián is the result of this one illicit meeting.

Rodríguez de Montalvo asserts that in the "original" Amadís, Esplandián eventually kills his father for this offense against his mother's honor; however, Montalvo amends this defect and resolves their conflict peaceably.

Oriana and Amadís defer their marriage for many years due to enmity between Amadís and Oriana's father, Lisuarte. Amadís absents himself from Britain for at least 10 years, masquerading as "The Knight of the Green Sword". He travels as far as Constantinople and secures the favor of the child-princess Leonorina, who will become Esplandián's wife. His most famous adventure during this time of exile is the battle with the giant Endriago, a monster born of incest who exhales a poisonous gas and whose body is covered in scales.

As a knight, Amadís is courteous, gentle, sensitive, and a Christian, who dares to defend free love. Unlike most literary heroes of his time (French and German, for example), Amadís is a handsome man who would cry if refused by his lady, but is invincible in battle and usually emerges drenched in his own and his opponents' blood.

== Principal characters ==
- Amadís: Greatest of knights-errant, renowned in feats of arms
- Perión: King of Gaula, father of Amadís
- Elisena: Queen of Gaula, mother of Amadís
- Galaor: Brother of Amadís
- Melicia: Sister of Amadís
- Gandales: Scottish knight, foster-father of Amadís
- Gandalin: Son of Gandales, squire of Amadís
- Lisuarte: King of Britain
- Brisena: Queen of Britain
- Oriana: Daughter of Lisuarte and Brisena, beloved of Amadís
- Esplandián: Son of Amadís and Oriana
- Leonorina: Princess of Constantinople, beloved of Esplandián
- Languines: King of Scotland
- Agrajes: Son of Languines
- Mabilia: Daughter of Languines
- Ardian: Dwarf who serves Amadís
- Abies: King of Ireland, defeated by Amadís
- Endriago: Monster defeated by Amadís
- Arcaláus: Wizard who opposes Amadís
- Urganda the Unknown: Sorceress who protects Amadís

== Literary significance ==
Called also Amadís sin tiempo (Amadis without Time) by his mother (in allusion to the fact that being conceived outside marriage she would have to abandon him and he would probably die), he is the most representative Iberian hero of chivalric romance. His adventures ran to four volumes, probably the most popular such tales of their time. François de la Noue, one of the Huguenot captains of the 16th century, affirmed that reading the romances of Amadis had caused a "spirit of vertigo" even in his more rationally-minded generation. The books show a complete idealization and simplification of knight-errantry. Even servants are hardly heard of, but there are many princesses, ladies and kings. Knights and damsels in distress are found everywhere. The book's style is reasonably modern, but lacks dialogue and the character's impressions, mostly describing the action.

The book's style was praised by the usually demanding Juan de Valdés, although he considered that from time to time it was too low or too high a style. The language is characterized by a certain "Latinizing" influence in its syntax, especially the tendency to place the verb at the end of the sentence; as well as other such details, such as the use of the present participle, which bring Amadís into line with the allegorical style of the 15th century.

Nevertheless, there is a breach of style when Garci Rodriguez de Montalvo presents the fourth book. It becomes dull and solemn, reflecting the nature of the intruding writer. The first three books are inspired in deeds and feats by knights-errant, dating back to the 13th century, while the fourth book emerges as a less brilliant attachment of the 15th century. The pristine style of Amadís can be perceived in the few original famous pages analyzed by Antonio Rodríguez Moñino: It is lively and straight to the facts of war and love, with brief dialogs, all quite elegant and amusing. Amadís of Gaula is frequently referenced in the humorous classic Don Quixote, written by Miguel de Cervantes in the early 17th century. The character Don Quixote idolizes Amadís and tries to imitate him.

Historically, Amadís was very influential amongst the Spanish conquistadores. Bernal Díaz del Castillo mentioned the wonders of Amadís when he marveled at his first sight of Tenochtitlan (modern Mexico City) – and such place names as California come directly from the work.

The English literary historian Helen Moore in her 2020 book Amadis in English: A Study in the Reading of Romance suggested the book has been popular over the centuries because:

it is essentially ... a good story: plenty of plot, numerous characters through whom readers can experiment … with what I call imaginative "transforms of the self," and highly-elaborated familial, erotic and political relationships. Amadis himself … successively plays the roles of righter-of-wrongs, melancholy lover and poet, and ruler of a new world. There are exotic and magical locations, and an expansive willingness to embrace in literary form the issues of its day, many of which are themes of continuing human fascination such as the boundaries (or not) of individual autonomy, the ideal forms of human society, and the relationship between the human and the material worlds.

The British writer C.S. Lewis said that Amadis was among his "own favourite reading" and that he had an "early & lasting love of Oriana."

== Origins ==
As mentioned above, the origins of the book of Amadís are disputed.

=== The existing texts ===
==== The version of Montalvo ====
The only known complete text of Amadís de Gaula is that of Garci Rodríguez de Montalvo, a Castilian writer. The earliest surviving text (book) is from 1508, although scholars accept that there were earlier editions.

If this text had been based on a Portuguese original, there would be linguistic evidence in the text. As there is none, the text of Montalvo must have been written in Castilian.

==== Manuscript fragments ====
The existence of a prior version of Books I to III has been supported by Antonio Rodríguez-Moñino's identification of four 15th-century manuscript fragments (c. 1420) which had been used for binding another book. The name "Esplandián" is clearly visible in one of these. The fragments are part of the collection of Bancroft Library, University of California, Berkeley. They show that, contrary to the usual view that Montalvo expanded the first three books, he instead abbreviated them.

=== Earlier mentions of Amadis ===
In the Spanish translation of Egidio Colonna's De regimine principum, Amadís is mentioned and also the poet Enrico, who could well be Enrico de Castiglia. Egidio Colonna was in Rome in 1267 when Henry of Castile was elected Senator. The translation was made around 1350 under King Peter the Cruel. This is the oldest mention of Amadís.

== Sequels in Spanish ==
Amadis of Gaul's popularity was such that in the decades following its publication, dozens of sequels of sometimes minor quality were published in Spanish, Italian, and German, together with a number of other imitative works. Montalvo himself cashed in with the continuation Las sergas de Esplandián (Book V), and the sequel-specialist Feliciano de Silva (also the author of Second Celestina) added four more books including Amadis of Greece (Book IX). Miguel de Cervantes wrote Don Quixote as a burlesque attack on the resulting genre. Cervantes and his protagonist Quixote, however, keep the original Amadís in very high esteem.

The Spanish volumes, with their authors and the names of their main characters:

- Books I–IV: 1508 (Garci Rodríguez de Montalvo): Amadís de Gaula
- Book V: 1510 (Garci Rodríguez de Montalvo): Las sergas de Esplandián
- Book VI: 1510 (Páez de Ribera): Florisando
- Book VII: 1514 (Feliciano de Silva): Lisuarte de Grecia
- Book VIII: 1526 (Juan Díaz): Lisuarte de Grecia
- Book IX: 1530 (Feliciano de Silva): Amadis of Greece
- Book X: 1532 (Feliciano de Silva): Florisel de Niquea (Parts I-II)
- Book XI: 1535 (Feliciano de Silva): Florisel de Niquea (Parts III-IV)
- Book XII: 1546 (Pedro de Luján): Silves de la Selva

== Translations, continuations and sequels in Castilian and other languages ==
Castilian sequels:

- Palmerin de Oliva – original anonymous text in Castilian: 1511
- Primaleon (son of Palmerin de Olivia) – original anonymous text in Castilian: 1512

=== French translations ===
The French translations did not follow the Spanish book divisions exactly, and the entire cycle in the French version extends to 24 books. Note that the book numbers of the French translation do not always correspond to the book numbers of the Spanish originals, and in both languages, "book" is not the same as "printed volume"; physical printed books sometimes contained more than one "book" of the series.

French translations, with their translators:

- Book I: 1540 (Nicolas de Herberay des Essarts)
- Book II: 1541 (Nicolas de Herberay des Essarts)
- Book III: 1542 (Nicolas de Herberay des Essarts)
- Book IV: 1543 (Nicolas de Herberay des Essarts)
- Book V: 1544 (Nicolas de Herberay des Essarts)
- (Spanish book VI was rejected as apocryphal)
- Book VI: 1545 (Nicolas de Herberay des Essarts) (actually Spanish Book VII)
- (Spanish Book VIII was rejected because it told of the death of Amadis)
- Book VII: 1546 (Nicolas de Herberay des Essarts) (actually Spanish Book IXa)
- Book VIII: 1548 (Nicolas de Herberay des Essarts) (actually Spanish Book IXb)
- Book IX: 1551 (Giles Boileau & Claude Colet) (actually Spanish Book Xa)
- Book X: 1552 (Jacques Gohory) (actually Spanish Book Xb)
- Book XI: 1554 (Jacques Gohory) (actually Spanish Book XIa)
- Book XII: 1556 (Guillaume Aubert) (actually Spanish Book XIb)
- Book XIII: 1571 (Jacques Gohory) (actually Spanish Book XIIa)
- Book XIV: 1574 (Antoine Tyron) (actually Spanish Book XIIb)
- Books XV–XXI: 1576–1581
- Books XXII–XXIV: after 1594

=== Flemish/Dutch translations ===
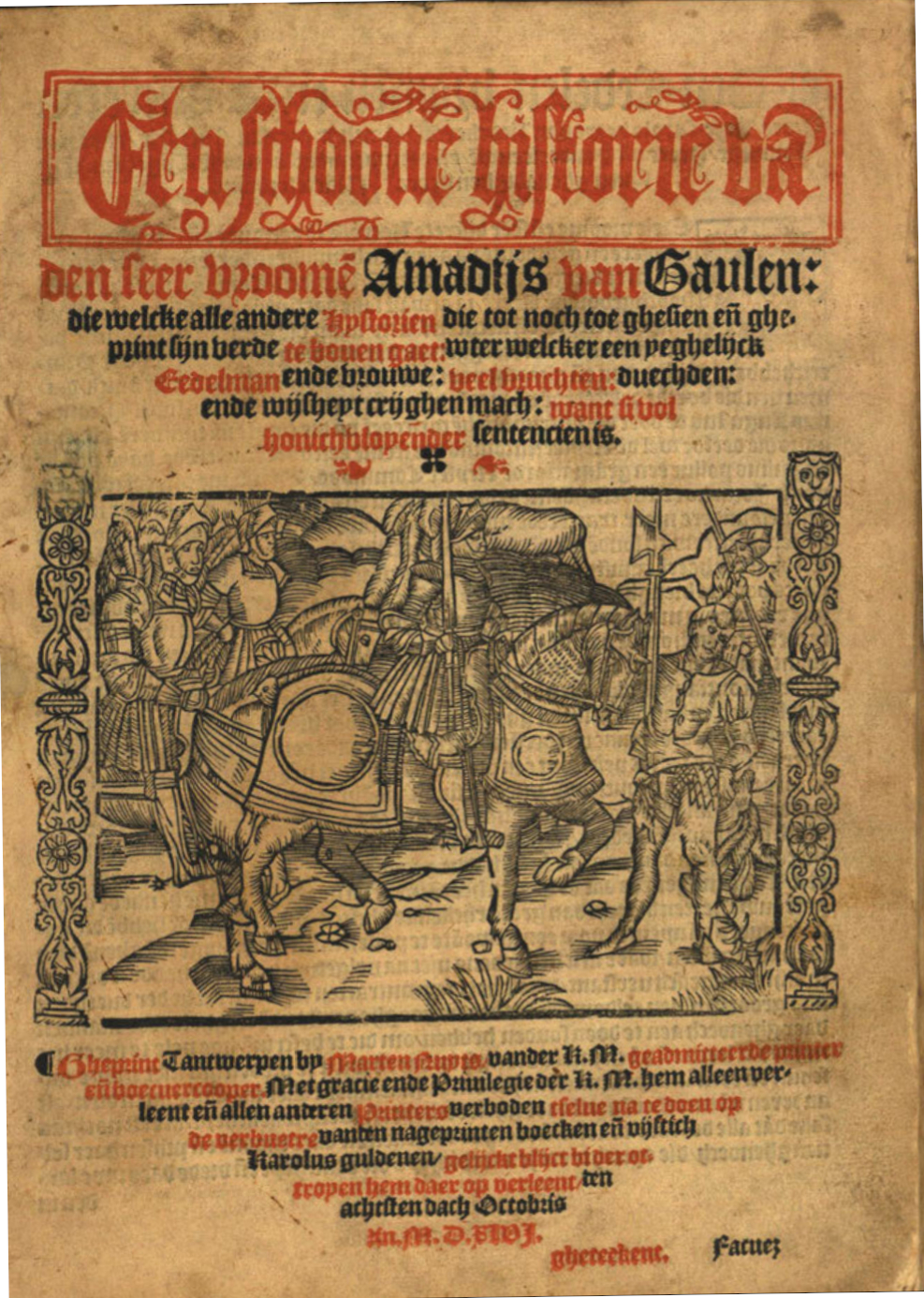
Title page of first Dutch language edition of the Amadis, Antwerp 1546

The first translation into Flemish/Dutch of the first book of the Amadís was published by Merten Nuyts in Antwerpen in 1546 under the title Een schoone historie van den seer vromen Amadijs van Gaulen (A beautiful story of the very pious Amadijs of Gaulen). The translation was made directly from the Spanish version. Only one copy of the first edition is still extant. This first edition was followed by a large number of Dutch Amadijs editions. By 1628, 66 editions of books I through XXI had been published.

=== Germany and England ===
In Germany and England, Amadís was known chiefly through its French translations, sometimes much revised, and in England the cycle was generally referred to by its French title Amadis de Gaule.

The German Continuation:

- Books XIX–XXI : 1594–5

The Italian Continuation:

- Books XIII–XVIII (Mambrino Roseo da Fabriano)

In Portugal, the Amadis cycle also launched other adventure series, such as:

- Palmeirim de Inglaterra (Palmeirim of England) – original Portuguese text by Francisco de Morais Cabral: c.1544 (published 1567)
- Dom Duardos – original Portuguese text by Diogo Fernandes
- Dom Clarisel de Bretanha – original Portuguese text by Gonçalves Lobato
- Crónica do Imperador Clarimundo (Chronicle of Emperor Clarimund) – original Portuguese text by João de Barros
- Sagramor – original Portuguese text by Gonçalo Fernandes Trancoso

== Operas ==
- Amadis (1684) by Jean-Baptiste Lully
- Amadis de Grèce (1699) by André Cardinal Destouches
- Amadigi di Gaula (1715) by George Frideric Handel
- Amadis de Gaule (1771) by Jean-Benjamin de La Borde and Pierre Montan Berton
- Amadis de Gaule (1779) by Johann Christian Bach
- Amadis (first performed 1922) by Jules Massenet
