= Adèle de Ponthieu (Piccinni) =

1781 French opera by Niccolò Piccinni

- Tragédie lyrique by Niccolò Piccinni
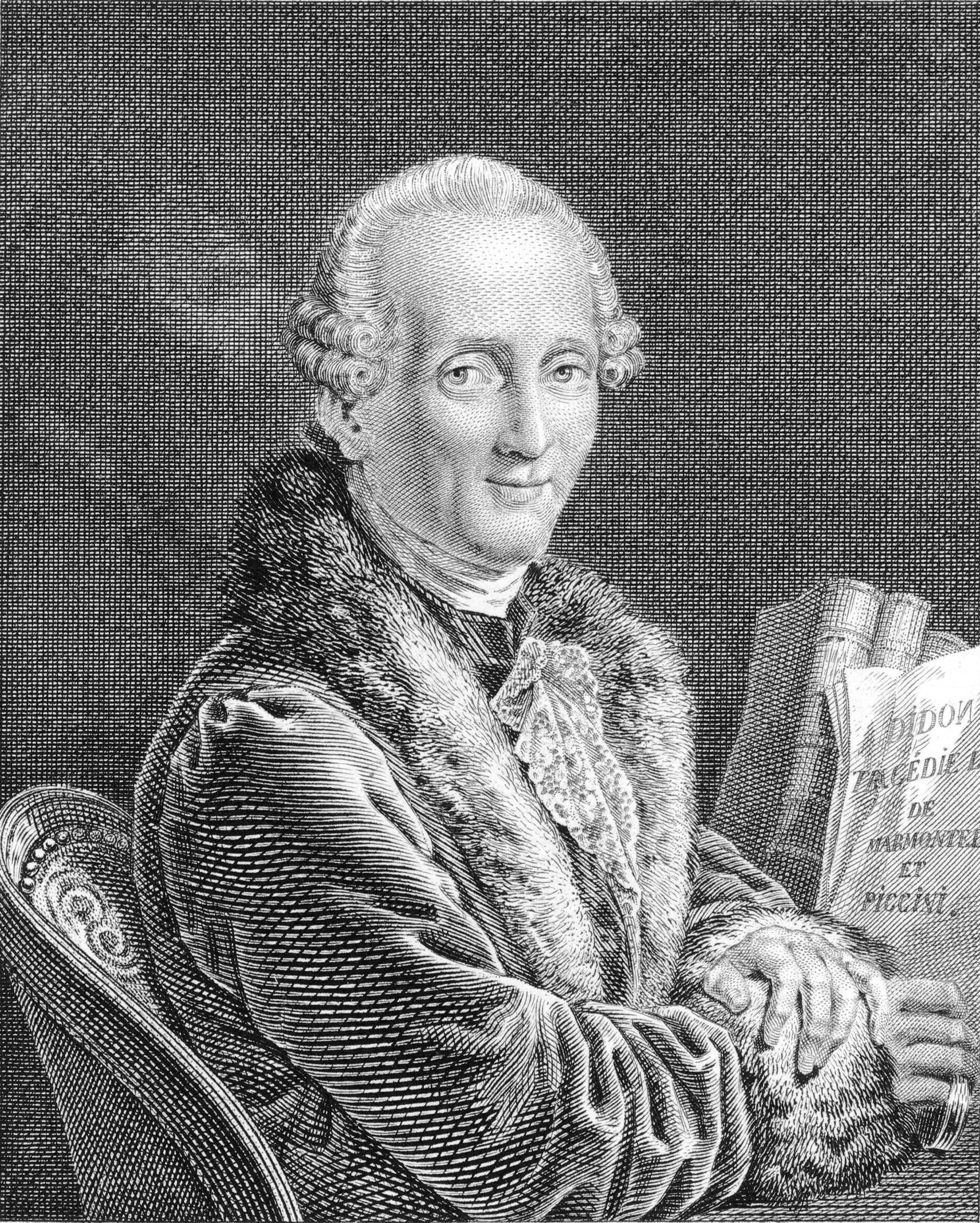
- Niccolò Piccinni, engraving by Hippolyte Pauquet
- Librettist: Jean-Paul-André Razins de Saint-Marc
- Language: French
- Premiere: 27 October 1781; Théâtre de la Porte Saint-Martin, Paris

Adèle de Ponthieu is a French-language opera by the composer Niccolò Piccinni, first performed at the Académie Royale de Musique, Paris (the Paris Opera) on 27 October 1781, to inaugurate the new venue of the theatre near the Saint-Martin gate. It takes the form of a tragédie lyrique in three acts. The libretto, by Jean-Paul-André Razins de Saint-Marc, had been previously set by the composers Jean-Benjamin de La Borde and Pierre Montan Berton in 1772.

== Roles ==
Cast	Voice type	Premiere, 27 October 1781
Guillaume III, Count of Ponthieu	basse-taille (bass-baritone)	Henri Larrivée
Adèle, the Count's daughter	soprano	Marie-Joséphine Laguerre
Alphonse of Est, an Italian knight	bass-baritone	Moreau
Raimond de Mayenne, a relative of the Count and a humble squire	haute-contre	Joseph Legros
Gérard d'Alsace, an old Knight, judge of the camp	bass-baritone	Auguste-Athanase (Augustin) Chéron
Enguerrand de Couci, another old Knight, judge of the camp	haute-contre	Cavalies (or Cavalier)
Renaud de Sarcus, another old Knight, judge of the camp	baritone	Louis-Claude-Armand Chardin ("Chardiny")
A lady of the court/a troubadour	soprano	Anne-Marie Jeanne Gavaudan, l'ainée (the Elder)
Ladies of the court	sopranos	Gertrude Girardin, Thaunat, Rosalie, Ancé
Chorus: The court of the Count, knights, squires, pages, king of arms, heralds, officers of the joust, fiddlers, jongleurs, youths and girls, people
