= Sancho Pança (opera) =

1762 opera by André Danican Philidor

Sancho Pança dans son isle is a 1762 French-language opera in one act by François-André Danican Philidor to a libretto by Antoine-Alexandre-Henri Poinsinet based on Miguel de Cervantes' Don Quixote. It premiered at the Comédie-Italienne on 8 July 1762.

== Recording ==
- Sancho Pança Opera Lafayette Naxos
