= Amadis (Massenet) =

Opera by Jules Massenet

- Opera by Jules Massenet
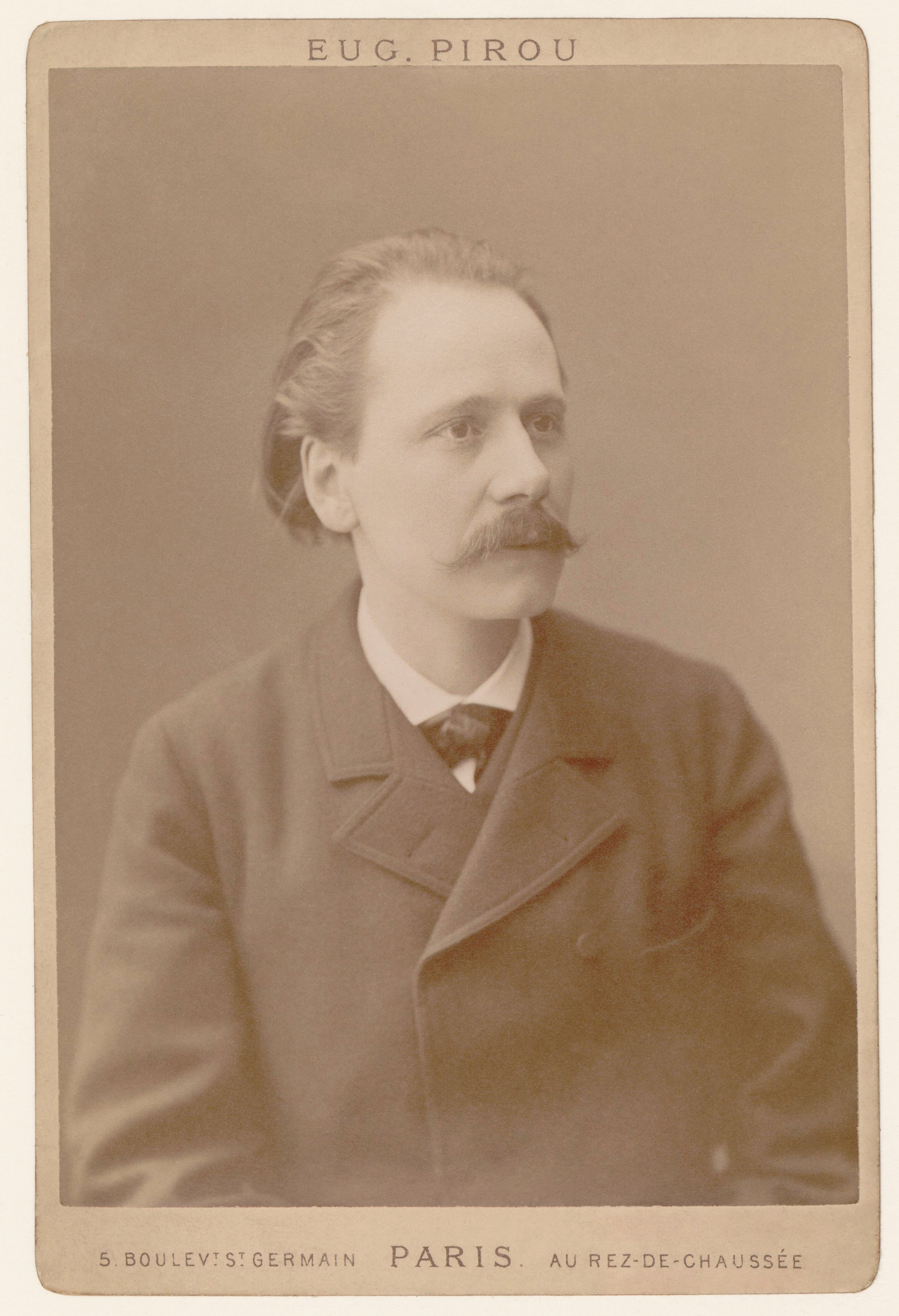
- The composer, Jules Massenet, photographed by Eugène Pirou, 1895
- Librettist: Jules Claretie
- Language: French
- Based on: Amadis de Gaula by Garci Rodríguez de Montalvo
- Premiere: 1 April 1922; Opéra de Monte Carlo

Amadis is an opera in three acts with prologue by Jules Massenet to a French libretto by Jules Claretie based on the Spanish knight-errantry romance Amadis de Gaula, originally of Portuguese origin, by Garci Rodríguez de Montalvo.

It was first performed at the Opéra de Monte-Carlo on 1 April 1922, nearly ten years after Massenet's death. Massenet had started to compose the piece in 1895 but shelved it and completed it clandestinely in the last years of his life. Amadis is one of three operas by Massenet to have been premiered posthumously; the others are Panurge (1913) and Cléopâtre (1914).

Amadis has gained no lasting popularity but was revived (and recorded on the Koch Swann label) during the Massenet Festival in Saint-Étienne, France in 1988.

== Roles ==
Role	Voice type	Premiere cast, 1 April 1922 (Conductor: Léon Jehin)
Amadis	contralto	"Djéma Vécla" (Margherita Grandi)
Floriane	soprano	Nelly Martyl
Galaor	tenor	Goffin
Le Roi Raimbert	bass	Gustave Huberdeau
Wenzel of Norway	tenor	Charles Delmas
Zorzi of Sicily	tenor	Carlo Bertossa
Curneval of Thuringe	tenor	Sini
Perdigon of Ireland	baritone	Ceresole
Arnaud of Aquitaine	baritone	Amurgis
Golias of Spain	baritone	Morange
Orlinde	soprano	Lucette Korsoff
Béatrice	soprano	Bilhon
Simone	soprano	Rossignol
Guillemette	soprano	Orsoni
Marguerite	soprano	Rogery
Hélène	soprano	Lecroix
La Fée	spoken	Féval
Hunter	spoken	Stéphane
Princess Elisène	mute	Sedova
Amadis and Galaor as children	mute	Rosa Brothers

== Synopsis ==
The story takes place in ancient Brittany and concerns the brothers Amadis and Galaor, separated at birth. Amadis kills Galaor in the final scene in a duel over the princess Floriane. When Amadis discovers magic stones around Galaor's neck identical to those given to him and his long lost brother by their dying mother, he realizes it is his brother he has killed.
