= Galaor =

Galaor was a hero of Portuguese romance. The book Amadís de Gaula is attributed to Portuguese authors, mainly Vasco de Lobeira.

The brother of Amadis de Gaul, Galaor was the model of a courtly paladin and was always ready with his sword to avenge the wrongs of widows and orphans. Unlike his more serious brother, Galaor is a profligate lover of women.

== See also ==
- Galaor, a comic book hero from Hexagon Comics
