= Lisuarte of Britain =

Character from Amadís de Gaula

Lisuarte of Great Britain is a character in the Spanish chivalric romance Amadís de Gaula and its sequel Las sergas de Esplandián, a work by Garci Rodríguez de Montalvo. Lisuarte is king of Great Britain and father of the peerless Oriana, beloved of Amadís de Gaula.
