= Jules Arsène Arnaud Claretie =

French literary figure and theatre director (1840–1913)

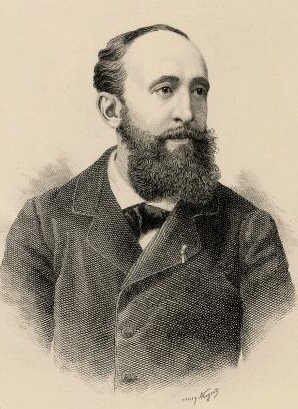
Jules Arsène Arnaud Claretie

Jules Arsène Arnaud Claretie (3 December 1840 – 23 December 1913) was a French literary figure and director of the Théâtre Français.

== Biography ==
He was born at Limoges. After studying at the lycée Bonaparte in Paris, he became a journalist, achieving great success as dramatic critic to Le Figaro and to the Opinion nationale. He was a newspaper correspondent during the Franco-Prussian War, and during the Paris Commune acted as staff-officer in the National Guard. In 1885 he became director of the Théâtre Français, and from that time devoted his time chiefly to its administration until his death. During the battle for Octave Mirbeau's comedy Les affaires sont les affaires ("Business Is Business"), the Comité de Lecture was abolished, in October 1901, and Jules Claretie obtained sole responsibility for choosing the modern plays to be performed. Claretie retired from the administration of the Théâtre Français in 1913.

He was elected a member of the Académie française in 1888, and took his seat in February 1889, being received by Ernest Renan.

== Works ==
The long list of his works includes:

- Histoire de la révolution de 1870-1871 (5 vols., 1875-1876)
- Cinq ans après: l'Alsace et la Lorraine depuis l'annexion (1876)
- some annual volumes of reprints of his articles in the weekly press, entitled La Vie à Paris; La Vie moderne au théâtre (1868-1869)
- Molière, sa vie et son œuvre (1871)
- Les Prussiens chez eux (1875)
- Histoire de la littérature française (2nd edition 1905)
- Candidat (1887), a novel of contemporary life
- Brichanteau, comédien français (1896)

La Vie à Paris was completed in 1913, and published after his death in 21 volumes in 1914.

Several plays, some of which are based on novels of his own:

- Les muscadins (1874)
- Le régiment de Champagne (1877)
- Les Mirabeau (1879)
- Monsieur le ministre (1883), and others

Claretie also wrote three operas for the music of Jules Massenet; La Navarraise (1894), based on his novel La cigarette and written with Henri Cain, Thérèse (1907), and Amadis (1922), a work begun by Massenet in 1895, but shelved and finished in the last years of his life and premiered posthumously.

=== Works in English translation ===
- (1876). Camille Desmoulins and His Wife.
- (1882). Monsieur le Ministre: A Romance in Real Life.
- (1896). The Crime of the Boulevard.
- (1897). Brichanteau: Actor.
- (1899). Vicomte de Puyjoli: A Romance of the French Revolution.
- (1905). Prince Zilah.
- (1911). Which Is My Husband?
- (2013). Obsession [L'Obsession (Moi et l'Autre), 1908] translated by Brian Stableford, Black Coat Press, ISBN 9781612272139

== See also ==
- A Clinical Lesson at the Salpêtrière – 1887 group tableau portrait by André Brouillet
