= Urganda =

Witch from Portuguese myths

Urganda is a mythological witch, the Portuguese equivalent of Circe, the witch whom Odysseus (according to the Odyssey) encountered on his journey home from Troy. She is an enchantress in the romances belonging to the Amadis and Palmerin series in the Spanish school of romance.

Urganda is one of the Fates who appear in Matteo Maria Boiardo's epic poem Orlando in Love (1495). In the poem she is the protector of Amadigi, along with fellow fate Oriana.

The Spanish poet Miguel Cervantes mentions her in the preliminary Poems of Don Quixote (1605). The part she plays in the poem is more like that of Merlin. She derives her title from the faculty which, like Merlin, she possessed: that of changing her form and appearance at will.

A hermitage folly designed in 1750 by Thomas Wright in the grounds of Badminton House, in Gloucestershire, England, and known as the Root House is dedicated to Urganda.
