= Saint-Selve =

- Commune
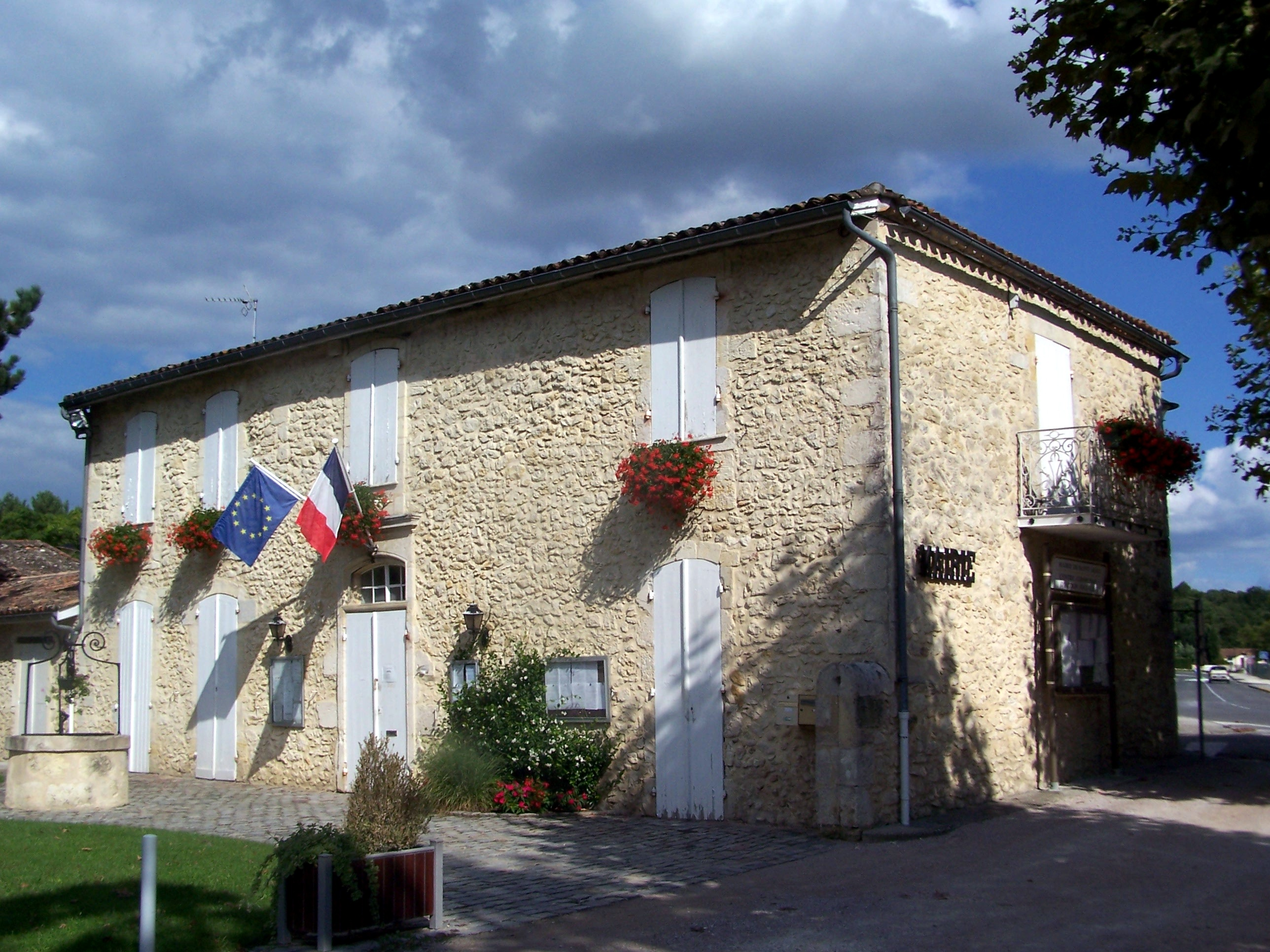
- The town hall in Saint-Selve
- Location of Saint-Selve
- Location within France Location within Nouvelle-Aquitaine
- Coordinates: 44°40′17″N 0°28′44″W
- Country: France
- Region: Nouvelle-Aquitaine
- Department: Gironde
- Arrondissement: Bordeaux
- Canton: La Brède
- Intercommunality: Montesquieu

Government
  - Mayor (2020–2026): Nathalie Burtin-Dauzan
- Area^{1}: 17.74 km^{2} (6.85 sq mi)
- Elevation: 45 m (148 ft)
- Highest elevation: 63 m (207 ft)
- Lowest elevation: 7 m (23 ft)
- Population (2023): 3,746
  - Density: 211.2/km^{2} (546.9/sq mi)
- Time zone: UTC+01:00 (CET)
  - Summer (DST): UTC+02:00 (CEST)
- INSEE/Postal code: 33474 /33650
- ^{1} French Land Register data, which excludes lakes, ponds, glaciers > 1 km^{2} (0.386 sq mi or 247 acres) and river estuaries.

Saint-Selve (French pronunciation: [sɛ̃ sɛlv]; Gascon: Sent Seuve) is a commune in the Gironde department in Nouvelle-Aquitaine in southwestern France. The 18th-century French playwright and librettist Jean-Paul-André Razins de Saint-Marc was born in the nearby château des Razins 29 November 1728.

== Population ==
Historical population
Year	Pop.	±% p.a.
1968	717	—
1975	789	+1.38%
1982	969	+2.98%
1990	1,324	+3.98%
1999	1,632	+2.35%
2007	1,897	+1.90%
2012	2,285	+3.79%
2017	3,026	+5.78%
2023	3,746	+3.62%
Source: INSEE

== See also ==
- Communes of the Gironde department
