= Le Père de famille =

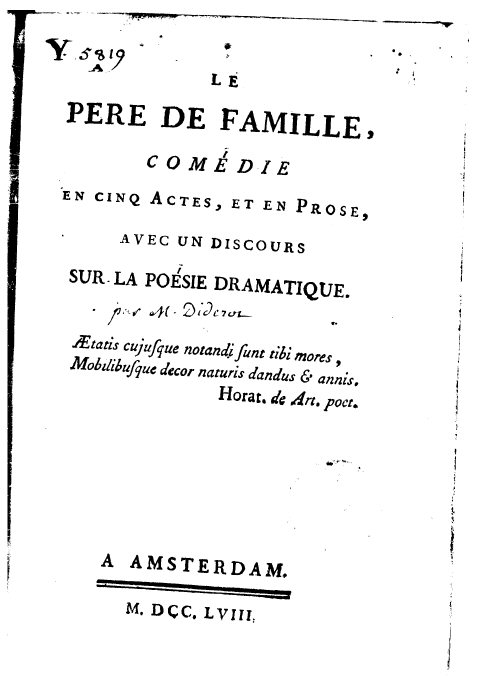
- Title page of first edition (1758)
- Original language: French
- Written by: Denis Diderot
- Characters: The father of the family Saint-Albin; Sophie; Germeuil; Cécile; The Commander
- Subject: Family relations
- Genre: Drama
- Setting: The Parisian home of the father of the family

Premiere
- Date: 1758
- Place: France

Le Père de famille (English: The Father of the family) is a 1758 play by Denis Diderot.

Diderot followed this play with a treatise on theatre entitled Discours sur la poésie dramatique.

In 1765, the play was parodised by Antoine-Alexandre-Henri Poinsinet.

The play was performed at the Richmond Theatre in Richmond, Virginia on the night of the fire of December 26, 1811.

Sophia Lee (English novelist and dramatist) based her first piece, a three-act drama (produced by George Colman the Elder performed at the Haymarket Theatre on 5 August 1780), called The Chapter of Accidents, on Le père de famille.

== Plot ==
In this play, Saint Albin, a young man, falls in love with Sophie, a poor young woman of unknown parentage. His father, the title character, is against the match, and his uncle actively plots against it by trying to force Sophie into a convent. Against her better judgement, Cécile, Saint-Albin's sister, hides Sophie in their home at the behest of Germeuil, a friend of the family. When the father discovers the disobedience of his children, he is dismayed; and the entire situation is exacerbated by the ill-intentioned uncle. When the uncle is confronted by the young woman in person, however, he realizes that she is his niece. With the question of her parentage solved, Saint-Albin is free to marry Sophie, Cécile is free to marry Germeuil, and the father welcomes all his children with open arms.
