= Perión =

In Spanish chivalric romance, Perión was the king of Gaula and father of Amadís de Gaula.
