= Arcaláus =

Arcaláus or Archelaus was an enchanter who persecuted the chivalric hero Amadís de Gaula.
