= The Chapter of Accidents =

1780 play by Sophia Lee

- Original language: English
- Written by: Sophia Lee
- Genre: Comedy

Premiere
- Date: 5 August 1780
- Place: Haymarket Theatre, London

The Chapter of Accidents is a 1780 comedy play by Sophia Lee. It was inspired by the play by Le Père de famille by Denis Diderot. The prologue was written by George Colman the Elder. It premiered at the Haymarket in London on 5 August 1780. The original cast included John Palmer as Woodville, Robert Bensley as Lord Glenmore, Richard Wilson as Governor Harcourt, Charles Bannister as Captain Harcourt, Francis Aickin as Grey, John Edwin as Jacob, Sarah Maria Wilson as Bridget and Elizabeth Farren as Cecelia.

== Bibliography ==
- Nicoll, Allardyce. A History of English Drama 1660-1900: Volume III. Cambridge University Press, 2009.
- Hogan, C.B (ed.) The London Stage, 1660-1800: Volume V. Southern Illinois University Press, 1968.
