= Lupăria =

Lupăria may refer to several villages in Romania:

- Lupăria, a village in Prăjeni Commune, Botoșani County
- Lupăria, a village in Cotnari Commune, Iași County
- Lupăria, a village in Ciolpani Commune, Ilfov County

and a village in Moldova:

- Lupăria, a village in Malinovscoe Commune, Rîșcani District

== See also ==
- Lobera (disambiguation)
- Lobeira (disambiguation)
