= Pierre-Antoine de La Place =

French writer and playwright (1707-1793)

Pierre-Antoine de La Place (1 March 1707, Calais – 14 May 1793, Paris) was an 18th-century French writer and playwright, the first translator of Shakespeare into French.

== Biography ==
A pupil at the English Jesuit College of Saint-Omer, Pierre-Antoine de La Place was compelled, after college, to get back to the study of French, which he had partly forgotten. His first literary attempts having been barely noticed, he imagined to send the news of his death in Paris where it was inserted in the Feuilles of abbot Desfontaines. If the scheme, once discovered, triggered laugh at the author's expense, the succès de scandale also drew him out of his darkness. The English literature being then fashionable, La Place was quick to exploit the genre from which he drew most of his income. In 1750, he became the first translator of Tom Jones, Henry Fielding's masterpiece, and the works of his sister, Sarah Fielding.

Having had the opportunity to do a favor to Madame de Pompadour, he obtained through her, the title of Secretary of the Academy of Arras and the privilege of the Mercure de France in 1760 but subscriptions under his leadership, diminished to the point that he had to withdraw about 1767, maintaining, in consolation, a 5,000-pound pension.

But what made him famous was his book, le Théâtre anglois, of which the first volume was published in Paris in 1745.

In the first four volumes of his work, The Place wrote a speech on the English stage (preface), an introduction to the life of Shakespeare, the translation of ten Shakespeare plays (Othello, Hamlet, Macbeth, Cymbeline, Julius Caesar, The Merry Wives of Windsor, Timon of Athens, Antony and Cleopatra, Henry VI, and Richard III), as well as summaries of twenty-six Shakespeare plays.

In the following four volumes, The Place translated plays by Ben Jonson, Thomas Otway, Edward Young, John Dryden, William Congreve, Nicholas Rowe, Thomas Southerne, Joseph Addison, Richard Steele and John Hughes.

If his translation work was widely appreciated (he also proposed a paraphrase of the first gothic novel by Clara Reeve, (The Champion of virtue), it also attracted him some enmity, especially that of Voltaire, who neither appreciated Shakespeare (as evidenced by his Lettres philosophiques (1734), nor the fact of losing his unique position of Shakespearean expert in France.

La Place also translated Oroonoko into French in 1745, but it was more an adaptation than a translation.

According to La Harpe, who wrote his biography, he was "a great braggart, but compelling, flexible, active, and over all a man of fun and good food."

Pierre-Antoine de La Place himself wrote some pieces which, however, had little success. It took nothing less than the formal order of the Duke of Richelieu to force the actors to represent Adèle de Ponthieu. He wrote under several pen-names, including "Skunk" and "Skupk".

== Works ==
- Le Théâtre anglais (1745–1748)

== Sources ==
- Ferdinand Hoefer, Nouvelle Biographie universelle, vol.40, Paris, Didot, 1862, (p. 1862).
- The Cambridge History of English and American Literature in 18 Volumes (1907–21). Volume V. The Drama to 1642, Part One. XII. Shakespeare on the Continent § 11. The Translations of La Place, and their effect on Voltaire and French Criticism. Online Version in Bartleby.com.
