= Amadis de Gaule (La Borde and Berton) =

Amadis de Gaule is an opera by the French composers Jean-Benjamin de La Borde and Pierre Montan Berton, first performed at the Académie Royale de Musique, Paris (the Paris Opera) on 26 November 1771. It takes the form of a tragédie en musique in five acts. The opera is a new setting of a libretto by Philippe Quinault, originally set by Jean-Baptiste Lully in 1684, based on Garci Rodríguez de Montalvo's Amadis de Gaula.

== Sources ==
- (in French) Félix Clément and Pierre Larousse Dictionnaire des Opéras, p. 26.
