= Adèle de Ponthieu (La Borde and Berton) =

Opera by Jean-Benjamin de La Borde and Pierre Montan Berton

Adèle de Ponthieu is an opera by the French composers Jean-Benjamin de La Borde and Pierre Montan Berton, first performed at the Académie Royale de Musique, Paris (the Paris Opera) on 1 December 1772. It takes the form of a tragédie lyrique in three acts. The libretto was written by Jean-Paul-André Razins de Saint-Marc, after a tragedy by Pierre-Antoine de La Place, staged at the Comédie-Française in 1757.

The opera had little success in its first run and was only revived in 1775 in five acts, for 38 performances, before being withdrawn for good. The three-act libretto, however, was later set by Niccolò Piccinni in 1781.

== Roles ==
Cast	Voice type	Premiere 1 December 1772
Guillaume, Count of Ponthieu	basse-taille (bass-baritone)	Henri Larrivée
Adèle, the Count's daughter	soprano	Sophie Arnould
Alphonse, a foreign knight	bass-baritone	Nicolas Gélin
Raimond de Mayenne, a relative of the Count and a humble squire	haute-contre	Joseph Legros
Alise, Adèle's confidante	soprano	Mlle Châteauneuf
Juges du camp (judges of the camp)	2 bass-baritones, haute-contre, taille (baritenor)	Cassaignade, de la Suze, Cavalier, Méon
Un berger (a shepherd)	bass-baritone	Durand
Une bergère (a shepherdess)	soprano	Mlle Beaumesnil (stage name of Henriette-Adélaïde de Villars)
Une jongleuse (a female jongleur)	soprano	Mlle Beaumesnil
Chorus: The court of the Count, knights, squires, king of arms, heralds, officers of the joust, fiddlers, male and female jongleurs, shepherds, shepherdesses
