= Lobera de la Vega =

Coordinates: 42°29′58″N 4°43′46″W

- Interactive map of Lobera de la Vega
- Country: Spain
- Autonomous community: Castile and León
- Province: Palencia
- Municipality: Pedrosa de la Vega
- Time zone: UTC+1 (CET)
  - Summer (DST): UTC+2 (CEST)

Lobera de la Vega is a hamlet of Pedrosa de la Vega located in the province of Palencia, Castile and León, Spain.

Lobera was quoted in the documentation of San Benito de Sahagún in times of Ramiro II of León as "Laenna laperca". From this village was originally Lobera family who in the 16th century went to San Cebrián Mazote and more was later extended to Galicia and Cuba. King Alfonso VIII of Castile, at the end of the 12th century, donated Lobera to the Monastery of San Zoilo in Carrión. Its parish church, dedicated to St. Andrew, is of brick, a nave covered with a vault of edge, highlighting its three neoclassical retables; side of the Gospel, Presibiterio and epistle.

== Other references ==
- http://www.vegavaldavia.com/Lobera
