= Amadis de Grèce =

1699 opera by André Cardinal Destouches

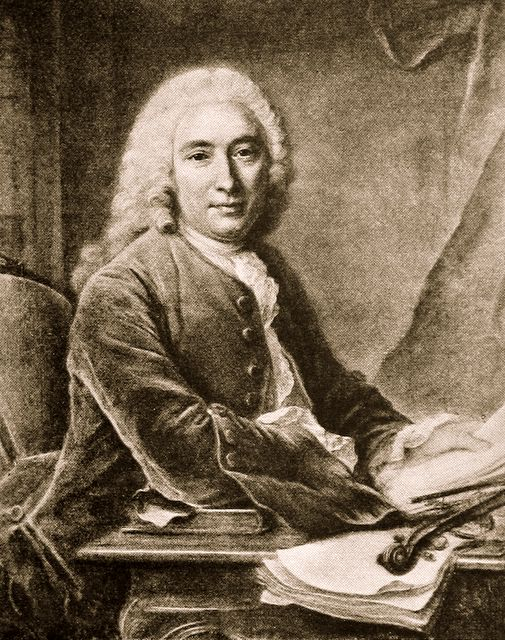
Composer André Cardinal Destouches

Amadis de Grèce (Amadis of Greece) is an opera by the French composer André Cardinal Destouches, first performed at the Académie Royale de Musique (the Paris Opera) on 26 March 1699. It takes the form of a tragédie en musique in a prologue and five acts. The libretto, by Antoine Houdar de La Motte, is based on the medieval romance Amadis de Gaula. La Motte's text was adapted to produce the Italian-language libretto for Handel's opera seria Amadigi di Gaula (1715).

== Characters ==
=== Main characters ===
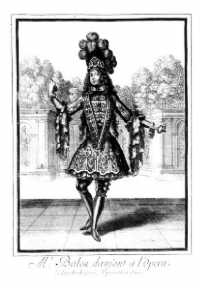
Amadis, character of the opera Amadis de Grèce by André Cardinal Destouches

Characters	Premiere Cast
Amadis	Gabriel-Vincent Thévenard
Zirpheus	Miss Poussin
Melissa	Francoise Journet
Nicated	Miss Moreau
Prince of Thrace	Louis Gaulard Dumesny
The shadow of the prince of Thrace	Louis Gaulard Dumesny

=== Others ===
- A young sailor
- An Enchanter
- An enchanted Knight
- An enchanted Princess
- The party leader
- Two Shepherds

== Rehearsals ==
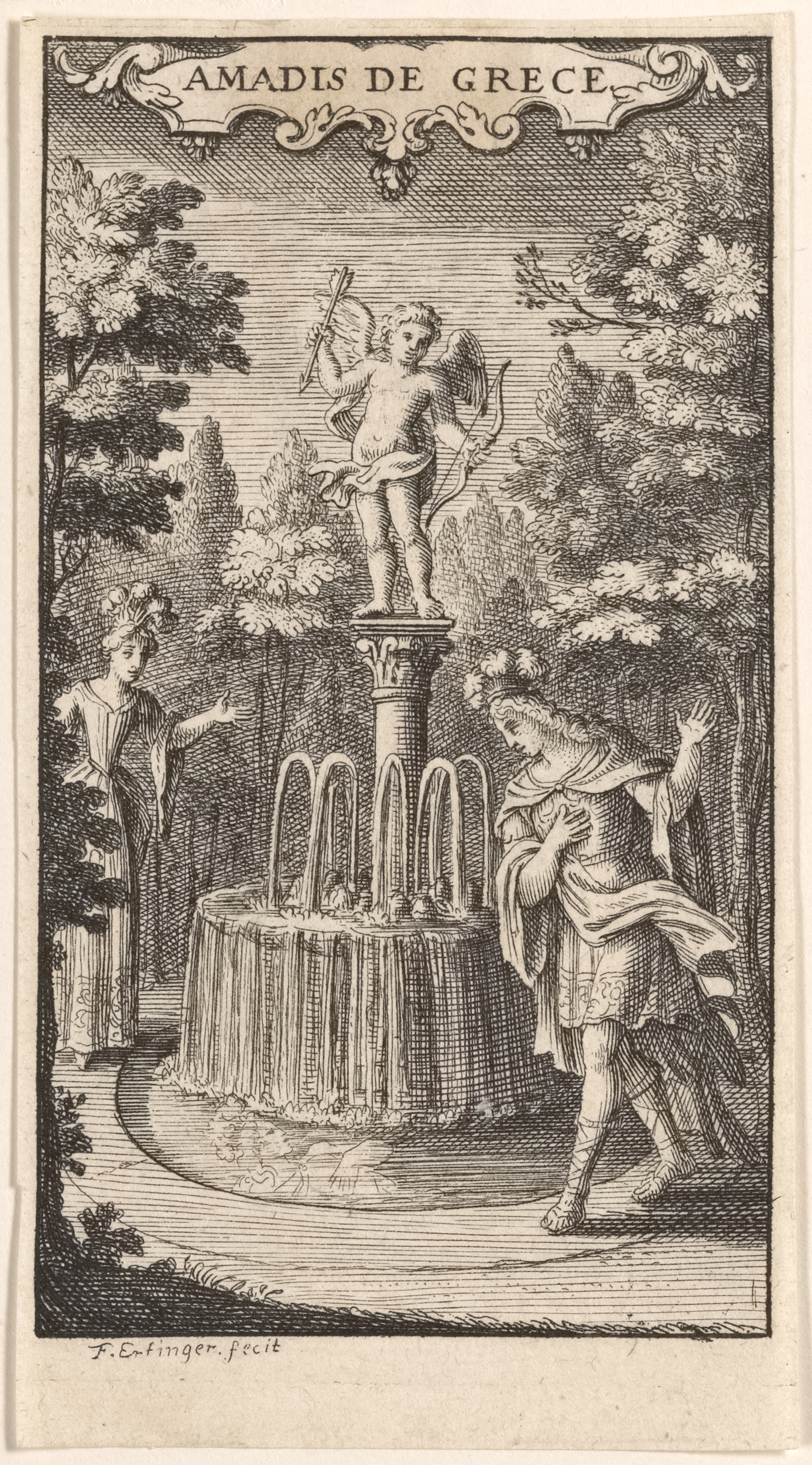
A scene from Act III of André Destouches's opera Amadis de Grèce. Amadis gazes at his reflection in the fountain of the truth of love; Melisse stands at left.

Rehearsals were held at Fontainebleau on October 17 and 24, as well as on November 7, 1698. Here is what the Marquis de Dangeau recorded in his Journal :

=== Friday 17th, at Fontainebleau ===
"The king went to shoot. In the evening he heard in the chamber of Saint-Louis the repetition of a music made by Destouches for a new opera."

— Journal by Marquis Dangeau

=== Friday, 24th, at Fontainebleau ===
"In the evening they repeated in the gallery des Cerfs half of the new opera made by Destouches."

— Journal by Marquis Dangeau

=== Friday, 7, at Fontainebleau ===
"In the evening, the last three acts of Destouches' new opera were repeated in the Galerie des Cerfs."

— Journal by Marquis Dangeau

== Early performances ==
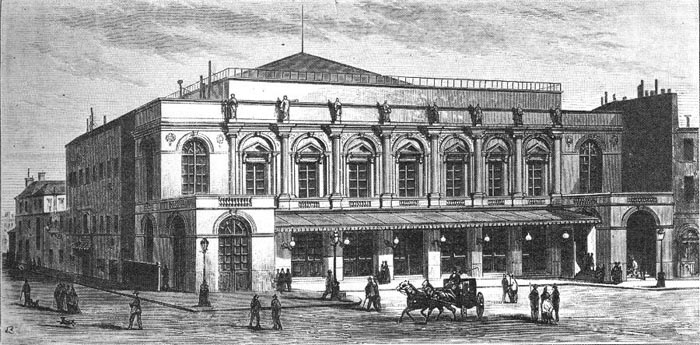
Académie Royale de Musique

=== Académie Royale de Musique in 1699 ===
Amadis de Grèce was premiered in the Académie Royale de Musique on the 26 of March, 1699.

=== Théâtre de la Monnaie in Brussels in 1711 ===
Amadis de Grèce was performed in the Théâtre de la Monnaie in Brussels in 1711.

=== Queen's Concerts in 1732 ===
Amadis de Grèce was performed during the Queen's Concerts in March 1732. The prologue and act I were performed on March 3 of 1732, then acts II and II on March 5, acts IV and V on March 10.
