= Antoine-Alexandre-Henri Poinsinet =

French playwright and librettist

Antoine-Alexandre-Henri Poinsinet, nicknamed "le jeune", (17 November 1735 in Fontainebleau – 7 June 1769, drowned in the Guadalquivir, in Córdoba) was an 18th-century French playwright and librettist.

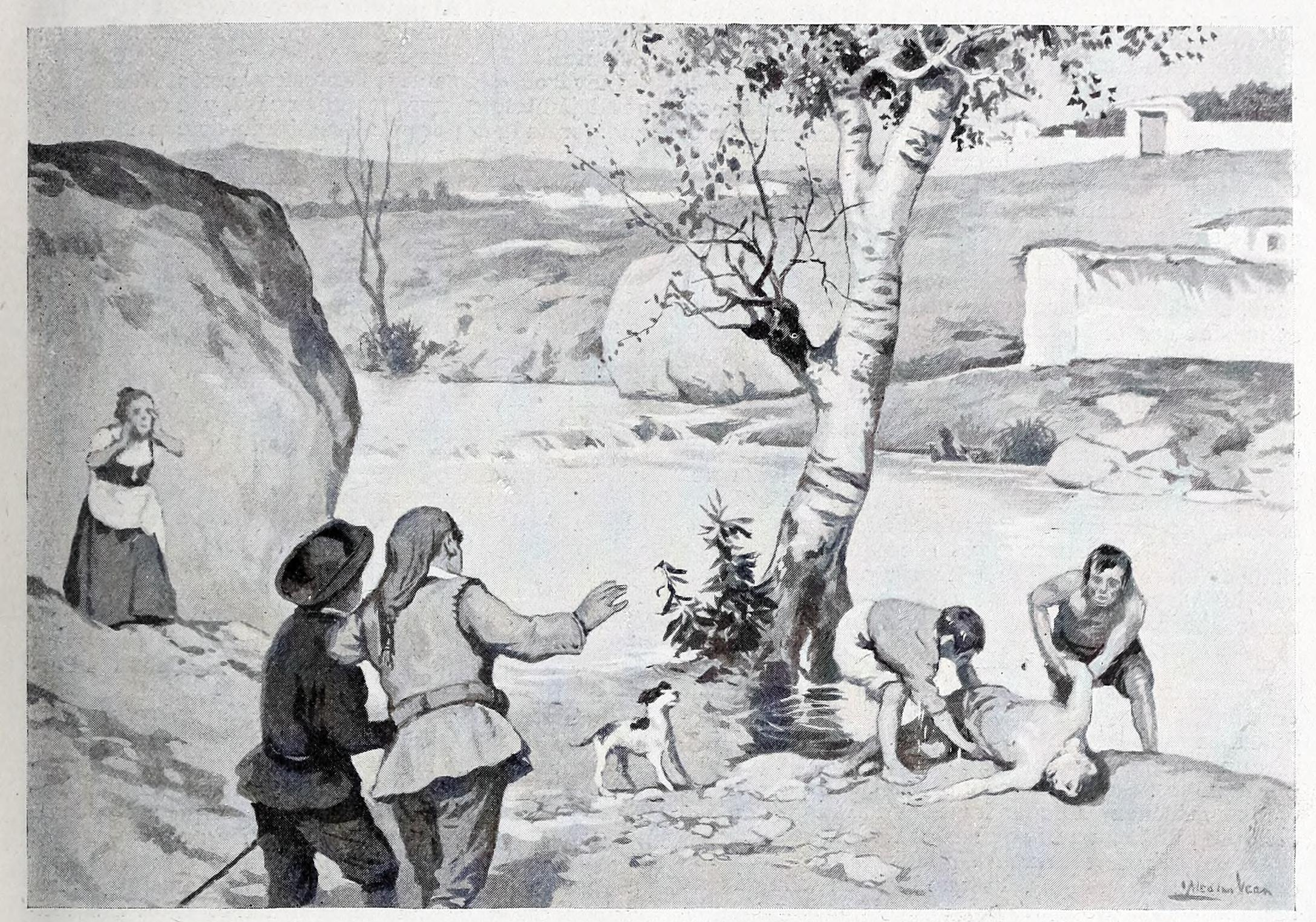
Death of Poinsinet

Born in a family long attached to the service of the House of Orleans where his father was a notary, Poinsinet deserted very young the basoche to indulge from his earliest youth to the taste of theater and poetry instead of following the example of his ancestors and take the job of his father. Although born with wit, he would not take the time to become better. Since the age of 18 when he had a parody of the opera Titon et l’Aurore (1753, in-8°) presented under the name Totinet, until his death, he continued to write and to be presented consecutively in all theaters of the capital. Some of his plays were successful, especially le Cercle, ou la Soirée à la mode (1771), which was long in the repertoire of Théâtre-Français.

He was a member of the Académie d'Arcadie and, for some time, of the Académie de Dijon.

Poinsinet worked with the composers Berton and Philidor who helped his reputation. The list of his works is very large, although his career was not long.

== Main works ==
- 1757: le Faux Dervis, opéra comique;
- 1758: Gilles, garçon peintre z’amoureux-t-et-rival, parody;
- 1760: le Petit Philosophe, comedy in one act and in free verse, parody of Philosophes by Palissot
- 1762: Sancho Pança dans son île, opéra bouffon;
- 1762: Tablettes des paillards (with Pressigny fils), in-24;
- 1763: la Bagarre, opéra bouffon;
- 1764: le Sorcier, comédie lyrique,
- 1764: Théonis, ou le Toucher, pastorale héroïque;
- 1764: les Fra-maçonnes, parody of the Cercle by Palissot (1755)
- 1765: Lettre à un homme du vieux temps sur l’Orphelin de la Chine (by Voltaire), in-8°;
- 1765: Сassandre aubergiste, parody of Le Père de famille;
- 1765: l’Inoculation, poem, in-8°;
- 1765: Tоm Jones, comédie lyrique;
- 1766: la Réconciliation villageoise, comédie lyrique;
- 1767: Gabrielle d’Estrées à Henri IV, héroïde, in-8°;
- 1767: Ernelinde, princesse de Norvège, tragédie lyrique en 5 actes (with Sedaine);
- 1769: Alexis et Alix, comedy mingled with ariettes; music by J. B. de La Borde;
- 1771: le Cercle, ou la Soirée à la mode on Gallica
- 1773: Sandomir, prince de Danemark, tragédie lyrique;
- Several Epîtres in verse.

== Sources ==
- Ferdinand Hoefer, Nouvelle Biographie universelle, t. 40, Paris, Paris, L. G. Michaud, 1862, p. 560-1.
- Chefs-d’œuvre des auteurs comiques, Paris, Firmin Didot Frères, 1846, p. 34.
- Nicolas-Toussaint Des Essarts, Les Siècles littéraires de la France, Paris, Chez l’auteur, 1801, p. 208-9.
