= Feliciano de Silva =

Spanish writer (1493-1554)

Feliciano de Silva (1491 – June 24, 1554) was a Spanish writer. Born in Ciudad Rodrigo to a powerful family, Silva wrote “sequels” to La Celestina and Amadis de Gaula. A prolific writer, his first chivalresque work, Lisurate de Grecia (nephew of Amadis de Gaula), was published in 1514. It is a relatively short work. His Amadis of Greece (1530) continued the success enjoyed by this first work. Amadis of Greece is divided into two parts which deal with the adventures of Amadis of Greece, Knight of the Burning Sword, son of Lisuarte of Greece and Onoloria of Trabizond (Trapisonda), as well as his love for both Princess Lucela of France and Princess Niquea of Thebes, whom he subsequently marries.

Silva followed this work with two others: Don Florisel de Niquea (Sir Florisel of Nicaea) (1532) – which deals with the knightly adventures and loves of first-born son of Amadís de Grecia and Princess Niquea – and Don Rogel de Grecia (Sir Rogel of Greece) (1535). In 1551, he published the voluminous Cuarta parte de don Florisel. Many of his chivalresque works were translated into English and French.

Feliciano's sequels to Amadis of Gaul:

- Book VII : 1514 Lisuarte de Grecia
- Book IX : 1530 Amadis de Grecia
- Book X : 1532 Don Florisel de Niquea
- Book XI : 1535 & 1551 Don Rogel de Grecia

His Segunda Celestina, his sequel to La Celestina, is an original work in its own right, and is a mixture of Erasmian satire, picaresque themes, and high-quality verses. One of many imitations of La Celestina, Silva's was the most popular, and features the love shared between Felides and Polandria.

He also wrote Sueño de Feliciano de Silva (Feliciano de Silva's Dream), added to the end of Amadis of Greece, which deals with the history of Silva's romance with the woman who would become his wife (in 1520), Gracia Fe, daughter of the converso Hernando de Caracena, against the wishes of his family. de Silva died in Ciudad Rodrigo, and was buried in the convent of Santo Domingo (no longer extant).

== Florisel of Niquea ==
Florisel of Niquea is a Spanish Chivalric romance of the sixteenth century, tenth in the series of Amadís de Gaula, and continues the action.

It was first printed in Valladolid in 1532. Its full title is 'The Chronicle of the Very Brave and Hard-working and Invincible Knights Don Florisel de Niquea and the Strong Anaxartes, sons of the very excellent Prince Amadís of Greece'. The work is divided into two books, the first of which has sixty-nine chapters and the second sixty-four. In accordance with the topic of false translation, the text is said to have been originally written in Greek language by Zirfea, queen of Argines, and later translated into Latin, from which Silva supposedly translated it into Spanish.

=== Summary ===
The work recounts the adventures of Don Florisel de Niquea, son of Amadís of Greece and Niquea, and of his half-brothers Anaxartes and Alastraxerea, extramarital children of Amadís of Greece and Zahara, queen of the Caucasus, and many other knights and maidens. The main characters are built on the Amadisian models of Amadís and Galaor, except that in this work the main protagonist, Don Florisel, is the fickle lover and Anaxartes, the secondary protagonist, is exemplary in his faithfulness.

==== First book ====
The twins Anaxartes and Alastraxerea, sons of Queen Zahara of the Caucasus, who believe they are children of the god Mars but whose real father is Amadís of Greece, are armed knights who set out in search of adventure. Florisel de Niquea is deceived by the princess Arlanda of Thrace, a relationship from which Florarlán will be born. Silvia, who is Florisel's aunt but thinks her parents are shepherds from Alexandria, arrives in Niquea and finds Alastraxerea, and together they decide to try to free Prince Anastarax, whom Silvia is in love with and who is enchanted in the Tower of the Universe. On the way they join a group consisting of Zair of Trabzon (son of Lisuarte from Greece and his second wife Abra), Zair's twin sister Leonoria, and Oriana, daughter of Olorius from Spain and Luciana from Greece. Silvia manages to disenchant Anastarax and it is discovered that she is the daughter of Lisuarte de Grecia and the late Onoloria.

Florisel de Niquea falls in love with Elena, daughter of King Brimartes of Apollonia (Poland), fiancée of Prince Lucidor of France. Florisel manages to evade Arlanda's harassment by pretending that she is Alastraxerea, whom she remarkably resembles; Alastraxerea tries to free him by pretending that she is Florisel, but falls prey to Arlanda. Wanting to escape from there, Florisel, who is supposed to be Alastraxerea, accepts the commission to defend the Tower of the Universe. Arlanda discovers the deception and orders Alastraxerea to go kill the Guardian of the Tower. However, before his arrival, Anaxartes appears in the Tower and confronts Florisel, without knowing their identities. Their combat is very violent and both fall senselessly to the ground, which breaks the enchantment of the Tower and all the princes who were enchanted there are released, among which were Amadís de Gaula, Esplandián, Lisuarte de Grecia and Amadís from Greece.

Florisel goes to Apollonia, to try to prevent the marriage of Lucidor and Elena. Alastraxerea, still under the identity of Florisel, is kidnapped by Don Falanges de Astra, extramarital son of the King of Trapobana, who has fallen in love with her. To rescue her, Florisel disguises herself as Alastraxerea, is captured by Phalanges, and achieves her sister's freedom. Phalanges forgives the deception and decides to accompany Florisel to Apolonia, where they arrive shortly before Lucidor. Florisel secretly marries Elena and they escape to Constantinople, where the weddings are held.

==== Second book ====
Prince Lucidor, seized with anger, swears revenge on the Greek imperial house and a war breaks out between France and Greece. After several battles and challenges, the support of Lucidor from the troops of Breo, king of Russia, who until then was an ally of the Greeks, forces them to retreat, but later the king of Russia decides to attack the French. The Greeks support Lucidor's army and together they defeat the traitor.

After the war, Amadís of Greece feels his old love for Princess Lucela reborn and he retires to an uninhabited mountain, where he is the victim of an enchantment. Florisel and other gentlemen looking for him. In the course of this search, and to save Don Falanges de Astra from death, Florisel is forced to marry, under the feigned identity of Morayzel, the beautiful Sidonia, queen of the Guindaya island. Sidonia becomes pregnant with Florisel, but he abandons her as soon as possible. Sidonia gives birth to a daughter, Diana, whose hand is offered by the spiteful mother to whom she brings Florisel's head. During a trip to Constantinople, Lucela manages to disenchant Amadís from Greece.

At the end of the play, the main characters congregate in Rhodes, where, through the intervention of Zirfea, Alquife and 'Urganda the Unknown', Amadís of Greece recognizes Anaxartes and Alastraxerea as children. Again in Constantinople, the weddings of Falanges and Alastraxerea, Anaxartes and the second Oriana, Florisel and Elena, Anastarax and Silvia and Lucidor and Leonoria are celebrated.

=== Reception ===
The work presents the peculiarity, very rare in the chivalric genre, of beginning with its chronological location, since as it is said in the first lines of chapter I of the first book, Queen Zahara gave birth to twins Anaxartes and Alastraxerea in May of the year 115 AD.

Florisel de Niquea was a significantly popular work among readers of chivalric books, as it had at least six reprints: three in Seville (one in 1536 and two in 1546), one in Lisbon (1566) and two in Zaragoza (1584 and 1587).

=== Translations ===
Florisel de Niquea was translated into Italian and published in that language in Venice in 1551. It was also translated into French language, but its two books were published as separate works, the first in 1551 and the second in 1552, as Books IX and X of the French Amadisian cycle. Thus divided, the work was translated into German and published as books IX (1573) and X (1574) of the so-called Amadís cycle of France, and into Dutch (1596 and 1597).

=== Sequels ===
Feliciano de Silva continued the action of the book in Rogel de Grecia, which is the third part (or third book) of Florisel de Niquea and was published in 1535. This work was continued by Pedro de Luján in Silves de la Selva, published in 1546. Silva ignored Luján's work and in 1551 published a voluminous Fourth Part of Don Florisel de Niquea, which was the last work in the Spanish Amadisian cycle. Mambrino Roseo wrote in Italian a continuation of Silves de la Selva, the First part of Esferamundi of Greece, first published in Venice in 1558.

In 1554 the same Mambrino Roseo published in Italian another continuation of the Florisel called Florarlán de Thracia, in which the adventures of this son of Don Florisel de Niquea and Princess Arlanda of Thrace are related.

== Legacy ==
Silva's style was subsequently mocked by Miguel de Cervantes, who made Feliciano de Silva Don Quixote's favorite author:

Y de todos ellos ninguno le parecían tan bien como los que compuso el famoso Feliciano de Silva, porque la claridad de su prosa y aquellas intrincadas razones suyas le parecían de perlas.

— Miguel de Cervantes, Don Quixote, Chapter 1

Translation:

And of all of them, none of them seemed as good as those written by the famous Feliciano de Silva, because the clarity of his prose and those obscure words of his seemed to be pearls.

The majority of Don Quixote commentators and scholars have sided with Cervantes in mocking Silva's works, though many of them had neglected to read them. Though he is hardly remembered today, de Silva enjoyed considerable success during the sixteenth century. His works are currently being re-evaluated and examined for their contribution to Spanish literature in the Siglo de Oro.
