= João de Lobeira =

Portuguese troubadour (died 1285)

João Pires de Lobeira (c. 1233–1285) was a Portuguese troubadour of the time of King Afonso III, who is supposed to have been the first to reduce into prose the story of Amadis de Gaula.

Carolina Michaëlis de Vasconcellos, in her masterly edition of the Cancioneiro da Ajuda (Halle, 1904, vol. 1, pp. 523–524), gives some biographical notes on Lobeira, who is represented in the Cancioneiro da Biblioteca Nacional (Halle, 1880) by five poems (Nos. 230–233). In number 230, Lobeira uses the same ritournelle that Oriana sings in Amadis de Gaula, and this has led to his being generally considered by modern supporters of the Portuguese case to have been the author of the novel, in preference to Vasco de Lobeira, to whom the prose original was formerly ascribed.

The folklorist A. Thomas Pires (in his Vasco de Lobeira, Elvas, 1905), following the old tradition, would identify the novelist with a man of that name who flourished in Elvas at the close of the 14th and beginning of the 15th century, but the documents he publishes contain no reference to this Lobeira being a man of letters. His name suggests he was from Lobeira, in the northernmost limits of Portugal.
