= Vasco de Lobeira =

Portuguese writer

Vasco de Lobeira (died 1403) was a Portuguese medieval writer to whom is attributed the prose original of the romance Amadis de Gaula. In the Portuguese Chronicle of Gomes Eannes de Azurara (1454), the writing of Amadís is attributed to Vasco de Lobeira, who was dubbed knight after the Battle of Aljubarrota (1385). However, other sources claim that in fact it was João Lobeira, and not the troubadour Vasco de Lobeira, and that rather than originating with him it was the revision of an earlier work from the beginning of the 14th century.

Another theory, postulated by the eminent scholar of Iberian literature, A. F. G. Bell, states that Vasco de Lobeira elaborated the work of his ancestor João Lobeira. Bell was of the opinion that Vasco had added romantic sections to the original text, which was mostly poetry written during the reign of King Dinis.

The query as to who authored Amadis de Gaula is further complicated by the fact that Vasco de Lobeira's name crops up in fifteenth and sixteenth century sources. The texts mention a Vasco de Lobeira receiving knighthood from King João I on the field of Aljubarrota, around 1385. But the first reference to Amadis de Gaula appears thirty-five years earlier, which would make Vasco over sixty years old when knighted or that he wrote his masterpiece in his youth. The only other possibility that remains is that 1350 reference was in fact to the poetic version by João de Lobeira.
