= Pierre Montan Berton =

French composer and conductor (1727–1780)

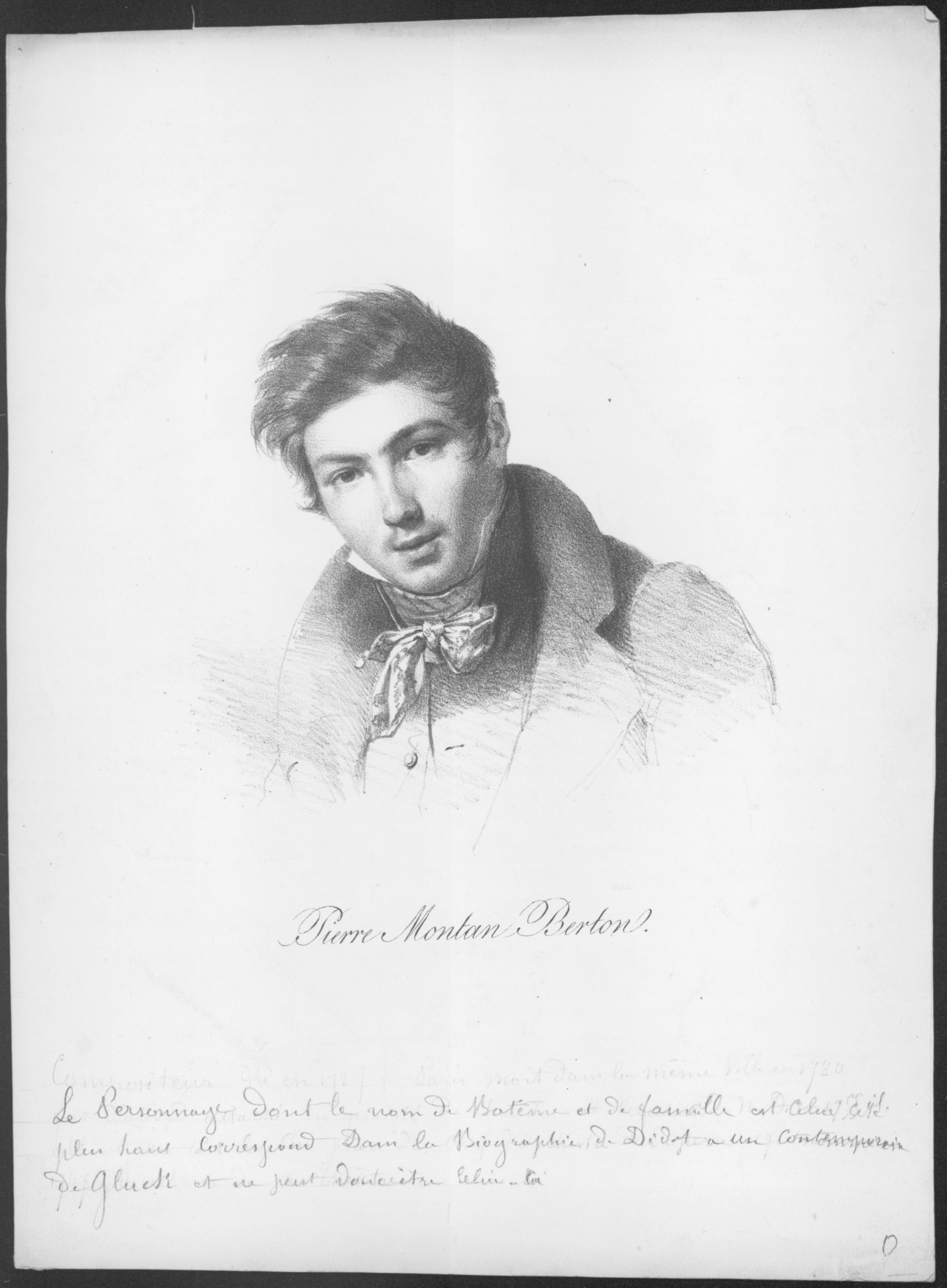
Pierre Montan Berton

Pierre Montan Berton (7 January 1727 – 14 May 1780) was a French composer and conductor. He resided primarily in Paris and was an opera director.

Pierre's son Henri Montan Berton (1767–1844) was also a composer, more famous than Pierre himself.

== Operas ==
Title	Genre	Number of acts	Libretto	Première date	Theatre
Sylvie (or Silvie)	pastorale-héroïque	3	Pierre Laujon	26 February 1749	Théâtre des Petits-Appartements, Versailles
Deucalion et Pyrrha (with François-Joseph Giraud)	acte de ballet	1	Pierre de Morand, Germain-François Poullain de Saint-Foix	30 September 1755	Théâtre du Palais-Royal, Paris
Erosine	pastorale-héroïque	1	Moncrif	9 November 1765	Château de Fontainebleau, Fontainebleau
Théonis, ou Le toucher	pastorale-héroïque	1	Antoine-Alexandre-Henri Poinsinet	11 October 1767	Salle des Machines, Paris
Amadis de Gaule (in collaboration with Jean-Benjamin de La Borde)	tragédie en musique	5	Philippe Quinault	26 November 1771	Académie Royale de Musique, Paris (Paris Opera)
Adèle de Ponthieu (in collaboration with Jean-Benjamin de La Borde)	tragédie en musique	3	Jean-Paul-André Razins de Saint-Marc	1 December 1772	Théâtre du Palais-Royal, Paris
Bellérophon	opéra	3	Jean-François Marmontel	20 October 1773	Théâtre du Palais-Royal, Paris

== Sources ==
- Article on Berton on the site CESAR (accessed on 31 October 2013)
