= Jean-Benjamin de La Borde =

French composer, patron, writer and fermier général (1734–1794)

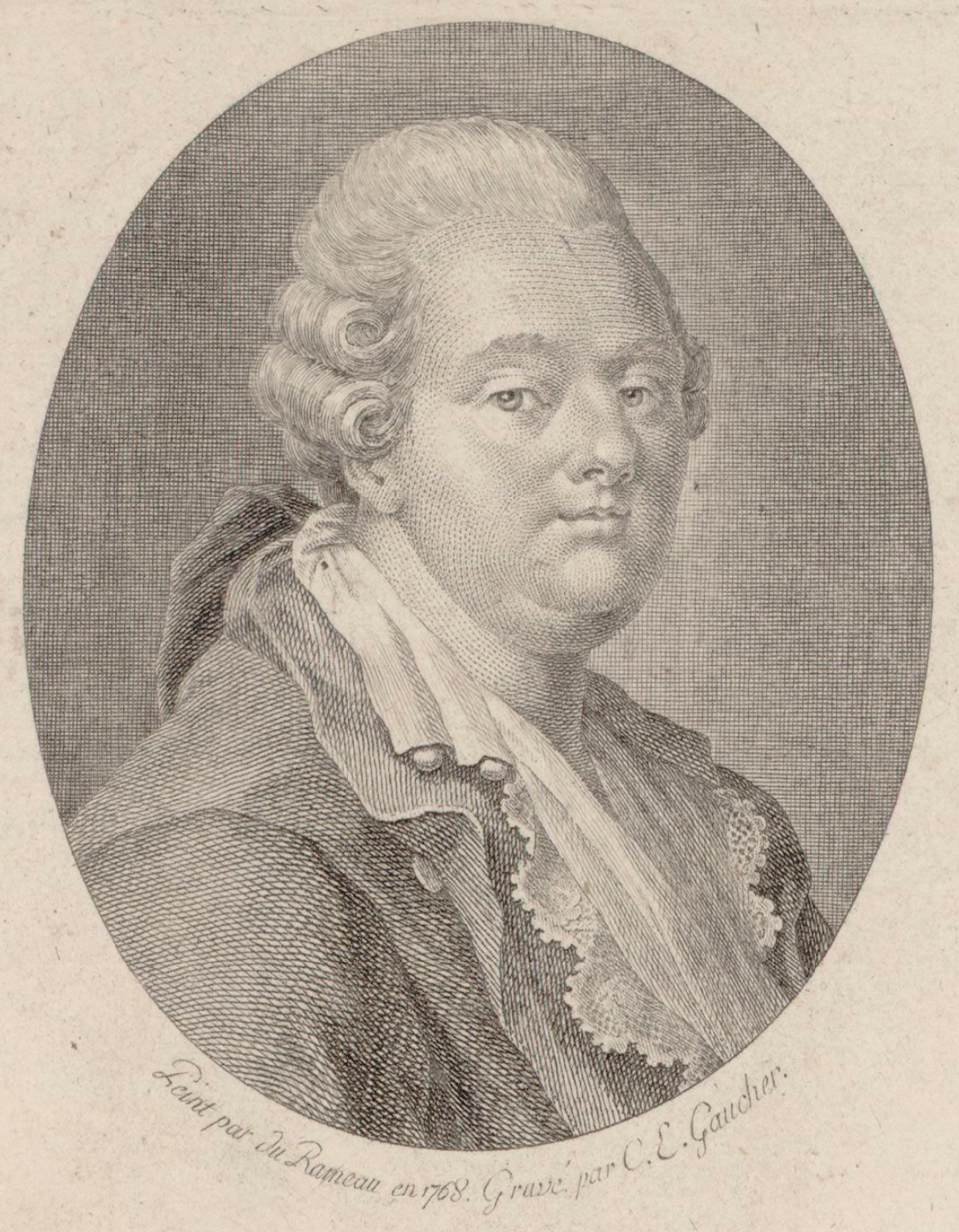
Jean-Benjamin de La Borde

Jean-Benjamin François de la Borde (5 September 1734 – 22 July 1794) was a French composer, writer on music and fermier général (farm tax collector). Born into an aristocratic family, he studied violin under Antoine Dauvergne and composition under Jean-Philippe Rameau. From 1762 to 1774, he served at the court of Louis XV as premier valet de la chambre, losing his post on the death of the king. He wrote many operas, mostly comic, and a four-volume collection of songs for solo voice, Choix de chansons mises en musique illustrated by Jean-Michel Moreau. Many of the songs from the collection were later published individually through the efforts of the English folksong collector Lucy Etheldred Broadwood. His Essai sur la musique ancienne et moderne was published in 1780. La Borde was guillotined during the French Revolution in 1794.

== Operas ==
Title	Genre	Number of acts	Libretto	Première date	Theatre
La chercheuse d'oiseaux	opéra comique en vaudeville	1	de Rozée	1748	?
Le rossignol ou le mariage secret	comédie en vaudeville	1	Charles Collé	18 November 1751	Château de Berny
Gilles garçon peintre, amoureux et rival	parody	1	Antoine-Alexandre-Henri Poinsinet	1757	Château de Berny
Les bons compères ou les bons amis	opéra comique	1	Michel-Jean Sedaine	5 March 1761	Foire Saint-Germain, Paris
Annette et Lubin	pastorale	1	Jean-François Marmontel	30 March 1762	Château de Choisy
Ismène et Isménias ou La fête de Jupiter	tragédie en musique	3	Pierre Laujon	13 June 1763	Château de Choisy
L'anneau perdu et retrouvé (in collaboration with Chardin)	opéra comique	2	Michel-Jean Sedaine	20 August 1764	Théâtre de l'Hôtel de Bourgogne Paris
Le dormeur éveillé	opéra comique	2	Louis Anseaume	27 October 1764	Château de Fontainebleau, Fontainebleau
Fanny	comédie-lyrique	1	Nicolas Chamfort	?	1765
Les amours de Gonesse	opéra comique (comédie mêlée d'ariettes)	1	Nicolas Chamfort, Charles-Simon Favart, the Marquis de Ménilglaise	8 May 1765	Théâtre de l'Hôtel de Bourgogne, Paris
Le coup de fusil	opéra comique (comédie mêlée d'ariettes)	1	?	1766	?
Le revenant	opéra comique	1	François-Georges Fouques Deshayes	1766	?
La bergère des Alpes (in collaboration with Josef Kohault)	pastorale	3	Jean-François Marmontel	19 February 1766	Théâtre de l'Hôtel de Bourgogne, Paris
Pandore (in collaboration with Joseph-Nicolas-Pancrace Royer)	opéra	5	Voltaire	14 February 1767	Menus Plaisirs du Roi, Paris
Amphion	pastorale	1	Antoine-Léonard Thomas	13 October 1767	Salle des Machines, Paris
Candide	opéra comique (comédie mêlée d'ariettes)	1	Le Prieur	1768	?
La meunière de Gentilly	opéra comique (comédie mêlée d'ariettes)	?	Pierre-René Lemonnier	13 October 1768	Théâtre de l'Hôtel de Bourgogne, Paris
Alix et Alexis	opéra comique (comédie mêlée d'ariettes)	?	Antoine-Alexandre-Henri Poinsinet	6 July 1769	Château de Choisy
Jeannot et Colin	opéra comique (comédie mêlée d'ariettes)	1	François-Georges Fouques Deshayes	1770	?
Colette et Mathurin	opéra comique (comédie mêlée d'ariettes)	?	François-Georges Fouques Deshayes	1771	?
La cinquantaine	pastorale	3	François-Georges Fouques Deshayes	13 August 1771	Théâtre du Palais-Royal, Paris
Amadis de Gaule (in collaboration with Pierre Montan Berton)	tragédie en musique	5	Philippe Quinault	26 November 1771	Académie royale de musique, Paris
Adèle de Ponthieu (in collaboration with Pierre Montan Berton)	tragédie en musique	3	Jean-Paul-André Razins de Saint-Marc	1 December 1772	Théâtre du Palais-Royal, Paris
L'amour quêteur	comédie	2	Alexandre-Louis-Bertrand Robineau ("Madame Beaunoir")	16 September 1777	Théâtre des Grands-Danseurs du Roi, Paris

== In popular culture ==
La Borde's role at court is embellished in a fictional book series about police commissioner "Nicolas Le Floch" by Jean-François Parot. The stories have also been adapted for a television series in which La Borde appears regularly.

He is portrayed by Benjamin Lavernhe in 2023 film Jeanne du Barry.
