= List of compositions by Johann Christian Bach =

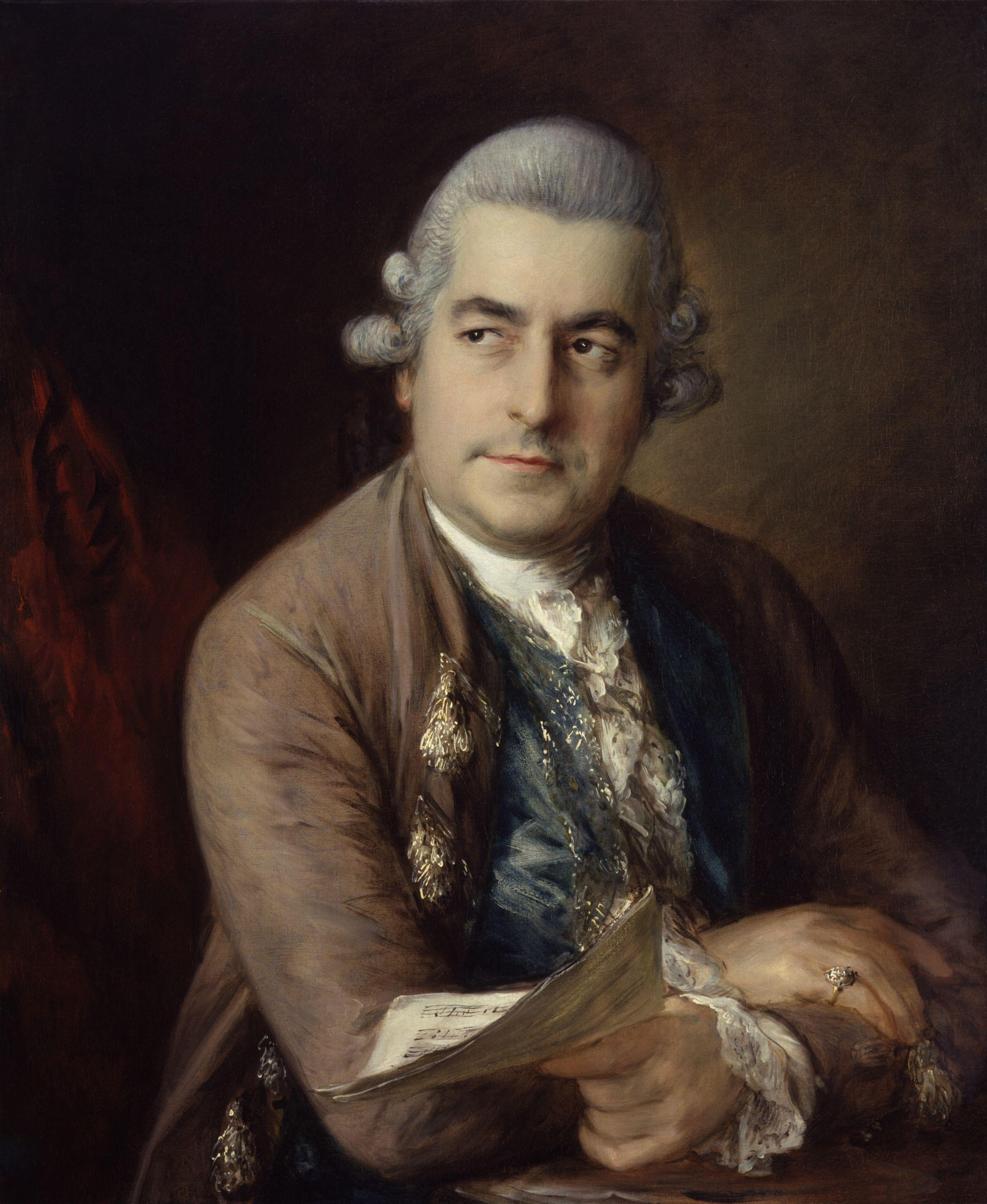
Portrait of Johann Christian Bach, painted in London by Thomas Gainsborough, 1776 (National Portrait Gallery, London)

This is a list of compositions by Johann Christian Bach. The opus numbers are taken from Ernest Warburton's The Collected Works of Johann Christian Bach.

== Keyboard works ==
- W A1. Keyboard Sonata Op. 5 No. 1 in B♭ major
- W A2. Keyboard Sonata Op. 5 No. 2 in D major
- W A3. Keyboard Sonata Op. 5 No. 3 in G major
- W A4. Keyboard Sonata Op. 5 No. 4 in E♭ major
- W A5. Keyboard Sonata Op. 5 No. 5 in E major
- W A6. Keyboard Sonata Op. 5 No. 6 in C minor
- W A7. Keyboard Sonata Op. 17 No. 1 in G major
- W A8a. Keyboard Sonata Op. 17 No. 2 in C minor
- W A8b. Keyboard Sonata in C minor
- W A9a. Keyboard Sonata Op. 17 No. 3 in E♭ major
- W A9b. Keyboard Sonata in E♭ major
- W A10a. Keyboard Sonata Op. 17 No. 4 in G major
- W A10b. Keyboard Sonata in G major "A Ne* W Lesson"
- W A11. Keyboard Sonata Op. 17 No. 5 in A major
- W A12. Keyboard Sonata Op. 17 No. 6 in B♭ major
- W A13. Keyboard Sonata in A minor
- W A14. Keyboard Sonata in A♭ major
- W A15. Toccata for keyboard in B♭ minor
- W A16. Keyboard Sonata in B♭ major
- W A17. Keyboard Sonata (lost)
- W A18. Sonata for keyboard 4-hands Op. 15 No. 6 in C major
- W A19. Sonata for keyboard 4-hands Op. 18 No. 5 in A major
- W A20. Sonata for keyboard 4-hands Op. 18 No. 6 in F major
- W A21. Sonata for 2 keyboards Op. 15 No. 5 in G major
- W A22. March for keyboard in F major
- W A23. Polonaise for keyboard in B♭ major
- W A24. Minuet for keyboard in C minor
- W A25. Minuet for keyboard in C major
- W A26. Polonaise for keyboard in E♭ major
- W A27. Aria for keyboard in A minor
- W A28. Minuet for keyboard in D minor
- W A29. Minuet and trio for keyboard in G minor
- W A30. Minuet and trio for keyboard in C major
- W A31. Minuet for keyboard in C major

== Chamber music ==
- W B1. Piece for harp (lost)
- W B2. Sonata for keyboard & violin Op. 10 No. 1 in B♭ major
- W B3. Sonata for keyboard & violin Op. 10 No. 2 in C major
- W B4. Sonata for keyboard & violin Op. 10 No. 3 in G major
- W B5. Sonata for keyboard & violin Op. 10 No. 4 in A major
- W B6a. Sonata for keyboard & violin Op. 10 No. 5 in F major
- W B6b. Sonata for viola da gamba in F major
- W B7. Sonata for keyboard & violin Op. 10 No. 6 in D major
- W B8. Sonata for keyboard & violin Op. 15 No. 3 in D major
- W B9. Sonata for keyboard & violin Op. 15 No. 4 in B♭ major
- W B10. Sonata for keyboard & violin Op. 16 No. 1 in D major
- W B11. Sonata for keyboard & violin Op. 16 No. 2 in G major
- W B12. Sonata for keyboard & violin Op. 16 No. 3 in C major
- W B13. Sonata for keyboard & violin Op. 16 No. 4 in A major
- W B14. Sonata for keyboard & violin Op. 16 No. 5 in D major
- W B15a. Sonata for keyboard & violin Op. 16 No. 6 in F major
- W B15b. Sonata for viola da gamba in F major
- W B16. Sonata for keyboard & violin Op. 18 No. 1 in C major
- W B17. Sonata for keyboard & violin Op. 18 No. 2 in D major
- W B18. Sonata for keyboard & violin Op. 18 No. 3 in E♭ major
- W B19. Sonata for keyboard & violin Op. 18 No. 4 in G major
- W B20. Sonata for keyboard & violin No. 1 in F major
- W B21. Sonata for keyboard & violin No. 2 in D major
- W B22. Sonata for keyboard & violin No. 3 in G major
- W B23. Sonata for keyboard & violin No. 4 in A major
- W B24. Sonata for keyboard & violin No. 5 in G major
- W B25. Sonata for keyboard & violin No. 6 in D major
- W B26. Sonata for keyboard & violin No. 7 in F major
- W B27. Sonata for keyboard & violin in A major
- W B28. Trio Sonata (lost)
- W B29. Trio Sonata (lost)
- W B30. Trio Sonata Op. 2 No. 5 in D major
- W B31. Trio Sonata Op. 2 No. 2 in A major
- W B32. Trio Sonata Op. 2 No. 6 in C major
- W B33. Trio Sonata Op. 2 No. 4 in G major
- W B34. Trio Sonata Op. 2 No. 3 in E♭ major
- W B35. Trio Sonata Op. 2 No. 1 in B♭ major
- W B36. Trio Sonata Op. 8 No. 3 in D major
- W B37. Trio Sonata Op. 8 No. 1 in G major
- W B38. Trio Sonata Op. 8 No. 2 in E♭ major
- W B39. Trio Sonata Op. 8 No. 5 in B♭ major
- W B40. Trio Sonata Op. 8 No. 6 in F major
- W B41. Trio Sonata Op. 8 No. 4 in E major
- W B42. Trio for 2 violins & cello in B♭ major
- W B43. Keyboard Trio Op. 2 No. 1 in F major
- W B44. Keyboard Trio Op. 2 No. 2 in G major
- W B45. Keyboard Trio Op. 2 No. 3 in D major
- W B46. Keyboard Trio Op. 2 No. 4 in C major
- W B47a. Keyboard Trio in A major (Milanese version)
- W B47b. Keyboard Trio Op. 2 No. 5 in A major
- W B48. Keyboard Trio Op. 2 No. 6 in E♭ major
- W B49. Keyboard Trio Op. 15 No. 1 in C major
- W B50. Keyboard Trio Op. 15 No. 2 in A major
- W B51. Quartet Op. 8 No. 1 in C major
- W B52. Quartet Op. 8 No. 2 in D major
- W B53. Quartet Op. 8 No. 3 in E♭ major
- W B54. Quartet Op. 8 No. 4 in F major
- W B55. Quartet Op. 8 No. 5 in G major
- W B56. Quartet Op. 8 No. 6 in B♭ major
- W B57. Flute Quartet in D major
- W B58. Flute Quartet in C major
- W B59. Flute Quartet in A major
- W B60. Quartet in B♭ major
- W B61. Quartet with 2 flutes Op. 19 No. 1 in C major
- W B62. Quartet with 2 flutes Op. 19 No. 2 in D major
- W B63. Quartet with 2 flutes Op. 19 No. 3 in G major
- W B64. Quartet with 2 flutes Op. 19 No. 4 in C major
- W B65. Quartet with 2 oboes (lost)
- W B66. Keyboard Quartet in G major
- W B67. Keyboard Quartet (lost)
- W B68. Keyboard Quartet (lost)
- W B69. Keyboard Quartet (lost)
- W B70. Quintet Op. 11 No. 1 in C major
- W B71. Quintet Op. 11 No. 2 in G major
- W B72. Quintet Op. 11 No. 3 in F major
- W B73. Quintet Op. 11 No. 4 in E♭ major
- W B74. Quintet Op. 11 No. 5 in A major
- W B75. Quintet Op. 11 No. 6 in D major
- W B76. Keyboard Quintet Op. 22 No. 1 in D major
- W B77. Keyboard Quintet Op. 22 No. 2 in F major
- W B78. Sextet for winds, strings & keyboard in C major
- W B79. Military Quintet No. 1 in E♭ major
- W B80. Military Quintet No. 2 in E♭ major
- W B81. Military Quintet No. 3 in B♭ major
- W B82. Military Quintet No. 4 in E♭ major
- W B83. March of the regiment "Prinz von Ernst" in E♭ major
- W B84. March of the regiment "Braunschweig" in E♭ major
- W B85. March of the regiment "Württemberg" in E♭ major
- W B86. March in E♭ major "zu Pferde"
- W B87. March in E♭ major "zu Fuß"
- W B88. March "vom ersten Bataillon Garde-Regiments in Hannover"
- W B89. March "vom zweiten Bataillon Garde-Regiments in Hannover"
- W B90. March in E♭ major
- W B91. March in E♭ major
- W B92. March in E♭ major
- W B93. March in B♭ major
- W BInc1. Sonata for guitar & violin in C major
- W BInc2. Trio for 2 flutes & cello in G major
- W BInc3. Trio for harp, violin & cello in B♭ major
- W BInc4. Keyboard Quartet in A major
- W BInc5. String Quintet in B♭ major
- W BInc6. Divertimento (lost)
- W BInc7. Symphony for winds No. 1 in E♭ major
- W BInc8. Symphony for winds No. 2 in B♭ major
- W BInc9. Symphony for winds No. 3 in E♭ major
- W BInc10. Symphony for winds No. 4 in B♭ major
- W BInc11. Symphony for winds No. 5 in E♭ major
- W BInc12. Symphony for winds No. 6 in B♭ major

== Orchestral works ==
- W C1. Symphony Op. 3 No. 1 in D major
- W C2. Symphony Op. 3 No. 2 in C major
- W C3. Symphony Op. 3 No. 3 in E♭ major
- W C4. Symphony Op. 3 No. 4 in B♭ major
- W C5. Symphony Op. 3 No. 5 in F major
- W C6. Symphony Op. 3 No. 6 in G major
- W C7a. Symphony Op. 6 No. 1 in G major
- W C7b. Symphony in G major
- W C8. Symphony Op. 6 No. 2 in D major
- W C9. Symphony Op. 6 No. 3 in E♭ major
- W C10. Symphony Op. 6 No. 4 in B♭ major
- W C11. Symphony Op. 6 No. 5 in E♭ major
- W C12. Symphony Op. 6 No. 6 in G minor
- W C13. Symphony Op. 8 No. 2 in G major
- W C14. Symphony Op. 8 No. 3 in D major
- W C15. Symphony Op. 8 No. 4 in F major
- W C16a. Symphony in C major (Venier No. 46)
- W C16b. Symphony in C major
- W C17a. Symphony in B♭ major
- W C17b. Symphony Op. 9 No. 1 in B♭ major (1773)
- W C18a. Symphony Op. 9 No. 3 in B♭ major (1773)
- W C18b. Symphony Op. 9 No. 2 in E♭ major (1773)
- W C19. Symphonie périodique in E♭ major
- W C20. Symphony Op. 12 No. 1 (lost)
- W C21. Symphony Op. 12 No. 2 (lost)
- W C22. Symphony Op. 12 No. 3 (lost)
- W C23. Symphony Op. 12 No. 4 (lost)
- W C24. Symphony Op. 12 No. 5 (lost)
- W C25. Symphony Op. 12 No. 6 (lost)
- W C26. Symphony Op. 18 No. 1 in E♭ major
- W C27. Symphony Op. 18 No. 4 in D major
- W C28. Symphony Op. 18 No. 5 in E major
- W C29. Symphony a 6 (lost)
- W C30. Overture a 6 (lost)
- W C31. Symphony for double orchestra (lost)
- W C32. Concertante for 2 violins & cello in G major
- W C33. Concertante for 2 violins & oboe in E♭ major
- W C34. Concertante for violin & cello in A major
- W C35. Concertante for 2 violins in D major
- W C36a. Concertante for 2 violins & cello in C major
- W C36b. Concertante for 2 violins & cello in C major
- W C37. Concertante for flute, oboe & bassoon in E♭ major
- W C38. Concertante for oboe & bassoon in F major
- W C39. Concertante for 2 flutes, 2 violins & cello in D major
- W C40. Concertante for 2 oboes, 2 horns & string quintet in E♭ major
- W C41. Concertante for flute, 2 clarinets, 2 horns & bassoon in E♭ major
- W C42. Concertante for 2 violins & cello in E♭ major
- W C43. Concertante for flute, oboe, violin & cello in C major
- W C44. Concertante for flute, 2 violins & cello in E major
- W C45. Concertante for oboe & string trio in G major
- W C46. Concertante for violin & cello in B♭ major
- W C47. Concertante for oboe, violin & 2 cellos (lost)
- W C48. Concertante for piano, oboe, violin & cello in B♭ major
- W C49. Keyboard Concerto Op. 1 No. 1 in B♭ major
- W C50. Keyboard Concerto Op. 1 No. 2 in A major
- W C51. Keyboard Concerto Op. 1 No. 3 in F major
- W C52. Keyboard Concerto Op. 1 No. 4 in G major
- W C53. Keyboard Concerto Op. 1 No. 5 in C major
- W C54. Keyboard Concerto Op. 1 No. 6 in D major
- W C55. Keyboard Concerto Op. 7 No. 1 in C major
- W C56. Keyboard Concerto Op. 7 No. 2 in F major
- W C57. Keyboard Concerto Op. 7 No. 3 in D major
- W C58. Keyboard Concerto Op. 7 No. 4 in B♭ major
- W C59. Keyboard Concerto Op. 7 No. 5 in E♭ major
- W C60a. Keyboard Concerto Op. 7 No. 6 in G major
- W C60b. Keyboard Concerto in G major
- W C61. Keyboard Concerto Op. 14 in E♭ major
- W C62. Keyboard Concerto Op. 13 No. 1 in C major
- W C63. Keyboard Concerto Op. 13 No. 2 in D major
- W C64. Keyboard Concerto Op. 13 No. 3 in F major
- W C65. Keyboard Concerto Op. 13 No. 4 in B♭ major
- W C66. Keyboard Concerto Op. 13 No. 5 in G major
- W C67. Keyboard Concerto Op. 13 No. 6 in E♭ major
- W C68. Harpsichord Concerto No. 1 in B♭ major
- W C69. Harpsichord Concerto No. 2 in F minor
- W C70. Harpsichord Concerto No. 3 in D minor
- W C71. Harpsichord Concerto No. 4 in E major
- W C72. Harpsichord Concerto No. 5 in G major
- W C73. Harpsichord Concerto No. 6 in F minor
- W C74. Concerto "nach Tartinis Manier" (lost)
- W C75. Piano Concerto in E♭ major
- W C76. Violin Concerto in C major
- W C78. Flute Concerto in G major
- W C79. Flute Concerto in D major
- W C80. Oboe Concerto No. 1 in F major
- W C81. Oboe Concerto No. 2 in F major
- W C82. Bassoon Concerto in E♭ major
- W C83. Bassoon Concerto in B♭ major
- W C84. Minuet for Her Majesty's Birthday in F major
- W C85. Minuet for Her Majesty's Birthday in C major
- W CInc1. Symphony in B♭ major
- W CInc2. Symphony in D major
- W CInc3. Symphony in E♭ major
- W CInc4. Symphony in F major
- W CInc5. Concertante for flute, 2 violins & cello in G major
- W CInc6. Harpsichord Concerto in E major
- W CInc7. Violin Concerto (lost)
- W CInc8. Flute Concerto in D major (lost)
- W CInc9. A Favorite Minuet in E♭ major

== Oratorios ==
- W D1. Gioas, re di Giuda
- W DInc1. Chorus for Piccinni's The Death of Abel (lost)
- W DInc2. Choruses for Pergolesi's Stabat Mater (lost)

== Liturgical works ==
- W E1. Kyrie in D major (lost)
- W E2. Kyrie in D major
- W E3. Gloria in D major
- W E4. Gloria in G major
- W E5. Credo in C major
- W E6. Invitatorium in F major
- W E7. Lectio del officio per gli morti I
- W E8. Lectio del officio per gli morti II
- W E9. Lectio del officio per gli morti III
- W E10. Miserere in B♭ major
- W E11. Ingresso e Kyrie della Messa de Morti in C minor
- W E12. Dies Irae in C minor
- W E13. Domine ad adjuvandum in D major
- W E14. Domine ad adjuvandum in G major
- W E15. Dixit Dominus in D major
- W E16. Confitebor tibi Domine in E♭ major
- W E17. Beatus vir in F major
- W E18. Laudate pueri in E major
- W E19. Laudate pueri in G major
- W E20. Magnificat a 8 in C major (unfinished)
- W E21. Magnificat a 8 in C major
- W E22. Magnificat a 4 in C major
- W E23. Salve Regina in E♭ major
- W E24. Salve Regina in F major
- W E25. Tantum ergo in F major
- W E26. Tantum ergo in G major
- W E27. Te Deum a 8 in D major (incomplete)
- W E28. Te Deum a 4 in D major

== Sacred works ==
- W F1. Pater Noster a 8 (lost)
- W F2. Attendite mortales in A minor
- W F3. Larvae tremendae in D major
- W F4a. Si nocte tenebrosa in G minor "for Raaf"
- W F4b. Si nocte tenebrosa in G minor "for Pompili"
- W F5. Let the solemn organs blo* W in D major
- W FInc1. Motet a 2 (lost)
- W FInc2. Motet a 3 (lost)

== Operas and incidental music ==
- W G1. Artaserse
- W G2. Catone in Utica
- W G3. Alessandro nell'Indie
- W G4. Orione, ossia Diana vendicata
- W G5. Zanaïda
- W G6. Adriano in Siria
- W G7. Carattaco
- W G8. Temistocle
- W G9. Lucio Silla
- W G10. La clemenza di Scipione
- W G11. Cantata a tre voci
- W G12. Galatea (lost)
- W G13. Cantata (lost)
- W G14. Serenata (lost)
- W G15. Endimione
- W G16. La tempesta
- W G17. O Venere vezzosa
- W G18. Amor vincitore
- W G19. Cefalo e Procri
- W G20. Rinaldo ed Armida (lost)
- W G21. Demofoonte
- W G22. La Giulia
- W G23. Gli Uccelatori
- W G24. Il tutore e la pupilla
- W G25. Astarto, re di Tiro
- W G26. La cascina
- W G27. La calamita de' cuori
- W G28. L'Olimpiade
- W G29. Orfeo ed Euridice (London, 1770)
- W G30. Aria (lost)
- W G31. Aria (lost)
- W G32. Aria (lost)
- W G33. Aria cantabile (lost)
- W G34. Vo solcando un mar crudele in D major
- W G35. Sventurata in van mi lagno in E♭ major
- W G36a. Perchè si ingrata, oh Dio! in E♭ major
- W G36b. Ah che gli stessi numi...Cara ti lascio
- W G37. A si barbaro colpo...Morte, vieni
- W G38. Scena di Berenice (lost)
- W G39. Amadis de Gaule
- W G40. Omphale (lost)
- W G41. Happy Morn, auspicious rise
- W G42. The Fairy Favour (lost)
- W G43. The Maid of the Mill
- W G44. The Summer's Tale
- W G45. The Genius of Nonsense (lost)
- W GInc1. Cantata (lost)
- W GInc2. Emira
- W GInc3. Gli equivoci
- W GInc4. Qualor da un galantuomo in B♭ major
- W GInc5. Coeurs sensibles in B♭ major
- W GInc6. Ode on the arrival of Queen Charlotte
- W GInc7. Menalcas
- W GInc8. Pharnaces (lost)
- W GInc9. Amintas (lost)

== Arias and songs ==
- W H1. Mezendore
- W H2. Der Weise auf dem Lande
- W H3. So fliehst du mich (lost)
- W H4. Canzonetta: Io lo so, che il bel sembiante
- W H5. Canzonetta: Trova un sol, mia bella Clori
- W H6. Canzonetta: Che ciascun per te sospiri
- W H7. Canzonetta: Chi mai di questo core
- W H8. Canzonetta: Ascoltami, o Clori
- W H9. Canzonetta: Lascia ch'io possa, o Nice
- W H10. Canzonetta: Parlami pur sincera
- W H11. Canzonetta: Eccomi alfin disciolto
- W H12. Canzonetta Op. 4 No. 1: Già la notte s'avvicina
- W H13. Canzonetta Op. 4 No. 2: Ah rammenta, o bella Irene
- W H14. Canzonetta Op. 4 No. 3: Pur nel sonno almen talora
- W H15. Canzonetta Op. 4 No. 4: T'intendo si, mio cor
- W H16. Canzonetta Op. 4 No. 5: Che ciascun per te sospiri
- W H17. Canzonetta Op. 4 No. 6: Ascoltami, o Clori
- W H18. Canzonetta Op. 6 No. 1: Torna in quell'onda chiara
- W H19. Canzonetta Op. 6 No. 2: Io lo so, che il bel sembiante
- W H20. Canzonetta Op. 6 No. 3: E pur fra le tempeste
- W H21. Canzonetta Op. 6 No. 4: Trova un sol, mia bella Clori
- W H22. Canzonetta Op. 6 No. 5: Chi mai di questo core
- W H23. Canzonetta Op. 6 No. 6: Se infida tu mi chiami
- W H24. Vauxhall Song: By my sighs you may discover
- W H25. Vauxhall Song: Cruel Strephon, will you leave me
- W H26. Vauxhall Song: Come Colin, pride of rural swains
- W H27. Vauxhall Song: Ah, why shou'd love with tyrant
- W H28. Vauxhall Song: In this shady blest retreat
- W H29. Vauxhall Song: Smiling Venus, Goddess dear
- W H30. Vauxhall Song: Tender Virgins, shun deceivers
- W H31. Vauxhall Song: Lovely yet ungrateful swain
- W H32. Vauxhall Song: When chilling winter hies away (lost)
- W H33. Vauxhall Song: Midst silent shades and purling streams
- W H34. Vauxhall Song: Ah seek to kno* W what place detains
- W H35. Vauxhall Song: Would you a female heart inspire
- W H36. Vauxhall Song: Cease a while ye winds to blow
- W H37. Vauxhall Song: See the kind indulgent gales
- W H38. Vauxhall Song: Oh ho* W blest is the condition
- W H39. Vauxhall Song: Hither turn thy wand'ring eyes
- W H40. Vauxhall Finale: Ode to Pleasure (lost)
- W H41. Vauxhall Finale: Ode to Summer (lost)
- W H42. Vauxhall Finale: The Pastoral Invitation (lost)
- W H43. Neptune
- W HInc1. Song(s) with unknown text(s) (lost)
- W HInc2. Canzonetta: Se tu m'ami, se sospiri

== Miscellaneous works ==
- W I1. Polonaise for keyboard in D minor
- W I2. Fughettas for organ (lost)
- W I3. Cadenzas for the concerto Op. 7 No. 5 in E♭ major

== Arrangements of other composers' works ==
- W LA1. Concerto for harpsichord solo No. 1 in C major
- W LA2. Concerto for harpsichord solo No. 2 in E♭ major
- W LA3. Concerto for harpsichord solo No. 3 in C major
- W LAInc1. Overture in D major
- W LG1. Orfeo ed Euridice (Naples, 1774)
- W LG2. Ebben si vada...Io ti lascio in A major
- W LG3. Mi scordo i torti...Dolci aurette in E♭ major
- W LG4. Sentimi non partir...Al mio bène in E♭ major
- W LG5. Infelice in van...Là nei regni in A major
- W LH1. The Braes of Ballenden
- W LH2. The Broom of Cowdenknows
- W LH3. I'll never leave thee
- W LH4. Lochaber
- W LH5. The yellow-hair'd Laddie (lost)
- W LHInc1. Not on beauty's transient pleasure

== Arrangements of J.C. Bach's works by other composers ==
- W XC 1. Symphony Op. 18 No. 6 in D major

== Attributed and spurious works ==
- W YA28. Sonata for keyboard 4-hands in D major
- W YA29. Sonata for keyboard 4-hands in G major
- W YA30. Sonata for keyboard 4-hands in C major
- W YA50. Fugue on BACH for organ in F major
- W YB22. Violin Sonata Op. 20 No. 2 in D major
- W YB43. Trio for flute or violin, violin & continuo in B♭ major
- W YB47. Trio for flute, flute or violin & cello in C major
- W YC90. Keyboard Concerto in E♭ major
- W YC91. Keyboard Concerto in A major
- W YLA3. Keyboard Sonata in D major
