= De Vismes =

De Vismes, Devismes, De Visme, Devisme is a French surname, the family comes from Vismes. Notable people with the surname include:

- Alphonse de Vismes (1746–1792), French playwright and librettist
- Jacques de Vismes (1745–1819), French writer
- Jeanne-Hippolyte Devismes (1770–1836), French composer
- Philip de Visme, stepfather of Theodosia Bartow Prevost
- William Francis de Vismes Kane (1840–1918), English entomologist
