= Amadis de Gaule (J. C. Bach) =

1779 opera by Johann Christian Bach

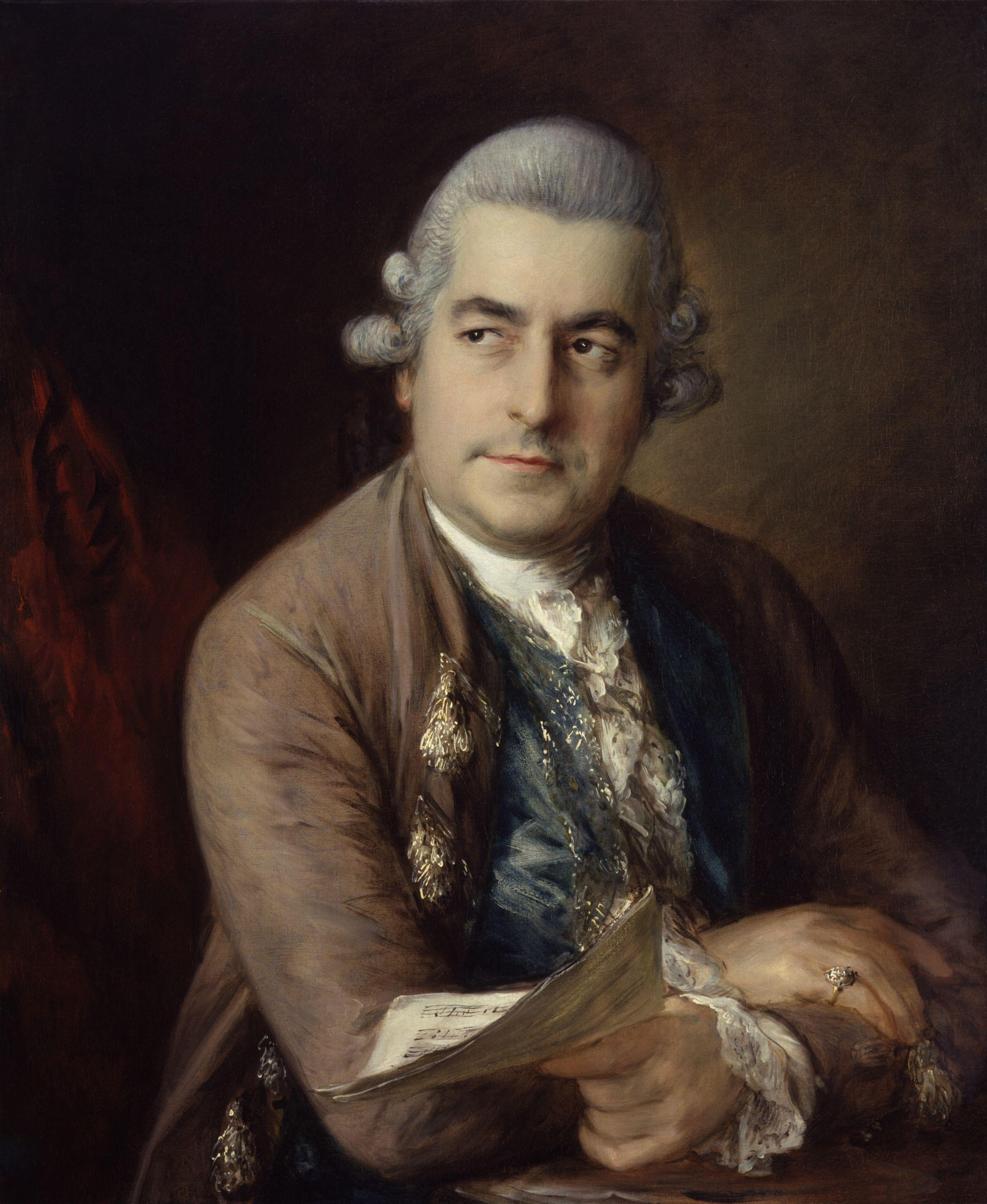
Portrait of Johann Christian Bach by Thomas Gainsborough, 1776

Amadis de Gaule, or Amadis des Gaules (Amadis of Gaul), is a French opera in three acts by the German composer Johann Christian Bach. The libretto is a revision by Alphonse de Vismes of Amadis by Philippe Quinault, originally set by Jean-Baptiste Lully in 1684, which in turn, was based on the knight-errantry romance Amadis de Gaula (1508). Bach's opera was first performed at the Académie Royale de Musique, Paris, on 14 December 1779. It followed the contemporary French fashion for resetting libretti by Quinault (Armide by Gluck and Roland by Piccinni are other examples of this trend). The work was not a success with the Parisian public, mainly because it pleased neither the supporters of Gluck nor those of Piccinni, the two leading rival opera composers in France at the time. It was the last opera J. C. Bach composed.

== Roles ==
Roles, voice types, premiere cast
Roles	Voice type	Premiere, 14 December 1779 Conductor: François Francoeur
Urgande	soprano	Mademoiselle Châteauvieux
Amadis	tenor	Joseph Legros
Oriane	soprano	Rosalie Levasseur
Arcabonne	soprano	Mademoiselle Durancy (Madeleine-Céleste Fieuzal de Frossac)
Arcalaüs	baritone	Moreau (Note: Henri Larrivée was scheduled to take the role but had to withdraw because of bad health.)
Ghost of Ardan Canile	bass	Péré

== Synopsis ==
=== Act 1 ===
Scene: A forest hung with trophies with a fortress in the background
The sorceress Arcabonne wrestles with her emotions. She has always tried to avoid love but has reluctantly fallen for the nameless knight who saved her life. Her brother Arcalaüs tells her to forget about the unknown knight and concentrate on destroying Amadis of Gaul, who was responsible for killing their brother Ardan Canil. Arcalaüs conjures up demons, including the allegorical figures of Hatred and Despair, to ruin Amadis' happiness. Amadis is in love with the English princess Oriane and the demons now use their magic to poison her with jealousy. Amadis does not understand why Oriane accuses him of unfaithfulness. She leaves him and he hears the sound of wailing; it comes from the prisoners Arcabonne has abducted and held captive in a fortress with her brother. Believing Oriane to be among the captives, Amadis attacks the fortress and puts Arcalaüs and his demons to flight when they block his way. But he is then deceived by another group of demons disguised as shepherds and shepherdesses, who disarm him and lead him into the fortress.

=== Act 2 ===
Scene: On one side, the tomb of Ardan Canil; on the other, a ruined palace and prison cells
In the prison, Arcabonne tells the captives that they are to be sacrificed to appease the ghost of her brother, Ardan Canil, and Amadis will be among them. As the ceremony is prepared, the voice of Ardan Canil's ghost is heard, prophesying that Arcabonne will betray him and soon die herself. As Amadis is led to execution, Arcabonne recognises him as the nameless knight who saved her life. In gratitude, she releases Amadis and his fellow prisoners.

=== Act 3 ===
Scene: A pleasant island
Arcalaüs wants to torment Oriane by showing her the corpse of Amadis. He is furious when his sister tells him she has released the knight. He tells Arcabonne he can prove her love for Amadis is in vain as Oriane and Amadis are still in love. He deludes Oriane into thinking she is seeing Amadis' dead body. Oriane now repents her jealousy, believing she has caused Amadis' death. Arcalaüs is about to kill the two lovers in earnest when the good fairy Urgande and her followers arrive. Arcalaüs prepares to fight, but Arcabonne – now realising Amadis will never return her love – kills herself, and the ghost's prophecy is fulfilled. Urgande touches Amadis and Oriane with a magic wand and they are freed from enchantments. Urgande now leads Amadis to free the prisoners in the enchanted palace of Appollidon.

The scene changes to the palace of Appollidon
Amadis frees the prisoners and the opera ends with general celebration.

== Recordings ==
- 1983: Martyn Hill, Bernadette Degelin, Felicity Palmer, Klein Omroepkoor, Radio Kamerorkest, conducted by Kenneth Montgomery (KRO, sung in French)
- 1993: James Wagner, Ulrike Sonntag, Ibolya Verebics, Bach-Collegium Stuttgart; Gächinger Kantorei, conducted by Helmuth Rilling (Hänssler, sung in German)
- 2012: Conducted by Didier Talpain (Ediciones Singulares, limited edition of 3000 copies (sung in French)
