= 2nd French Film Festival Kolkata =

Annual french film festival in Kolkata

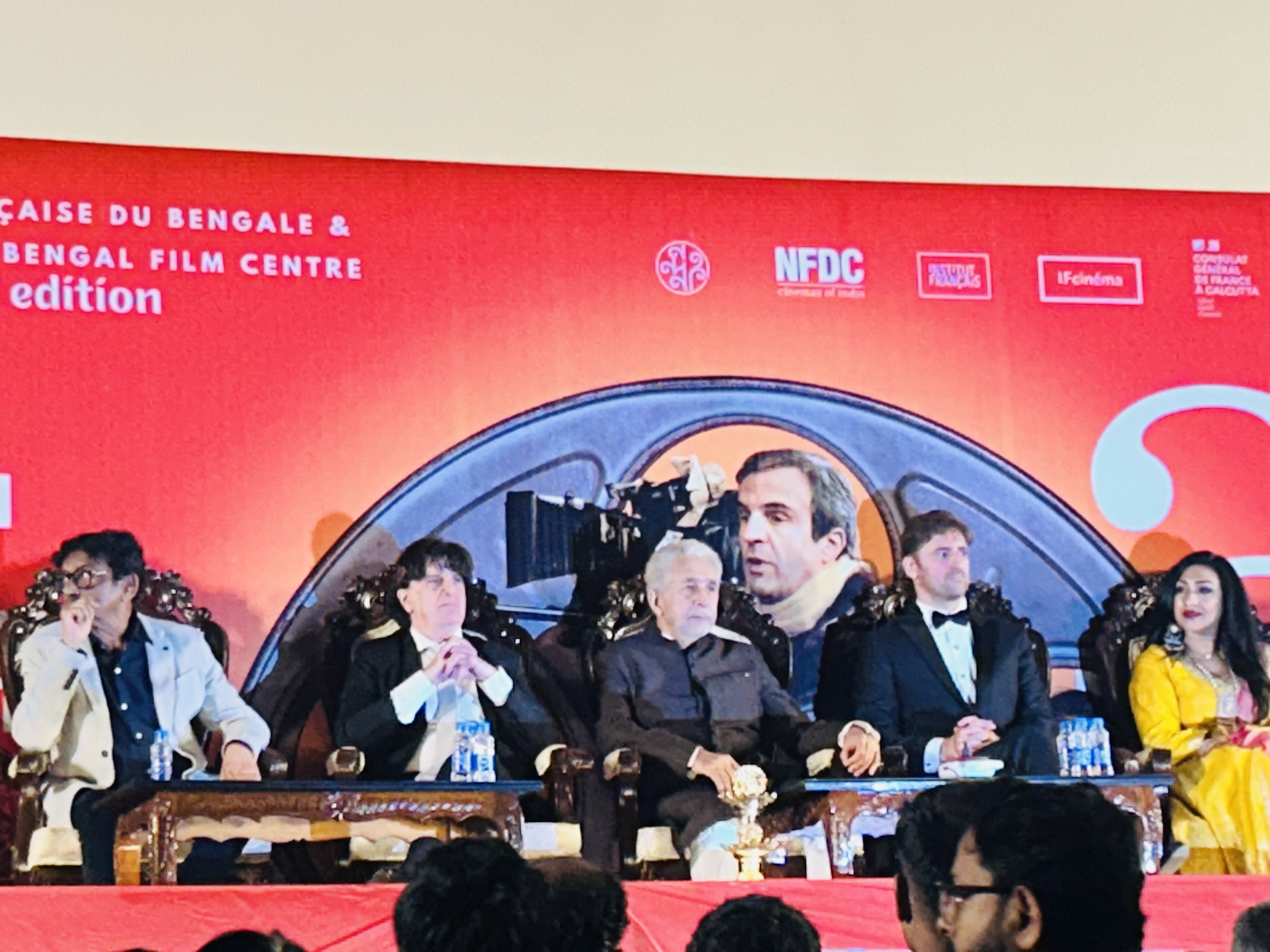
- Location: Kolkata, India
- Founded: 16 February 2024; 2 years ago (as French Film Festival Kolkata)
- Language: English, French
- Website: bengale.afindia.org/french-film-festival-kolkata-2025/#/

Current: 2025
- 2026 2024

The 2nd French Film Festival Kolkata is an annual film festival held in Kolkata.The event was held at Nandan Cinema hall in Kolkata for eight days during two weeks in the month of February and March 2025, from February 22 to March 1, 2025.

The festival's main objective was to promote cinematographic art by presenting high-quality feature film that showcases the crème de la crème of French cinema alongside Indian films that got appreciation in Cannes. Furthermore, as an audience one had cherished insightful discussions with the film crew after the film show.

This year, the festival showcased over 80 feature films more than last year's festival (42 feature films). The festival was inaugurated by film personalities like Naseeruddin Shah, Rituparna Sengupta, Anasuya Sengupta (actress), Anubhav Sinha, Goutam Ghose, Rukmini Maitra, Pritimoy Chakraborty and Trishaan Sarkar in the presence of Didier Talpain, Consul General of France in Kolkata; Nicola Facino, Director of Alliance Francaise du Bengale and Director of the festival, followed by the screening of the french feature film 'Delocalisés', directed by Ali and Redouane Bougheraba. from February 22 to March 1, 2025.

== History ==
The first inaugural French Film Festival was started in the year 2024 in the month of February, jointly organised by the Alliance Française du Bengale, the Consulate of France in Kolkata in association with the Government of West Bengal.
