= Florian Roski =

German entrepreneur and male beauty pageant titleholder

- Born: September 22, 1974 (age 51); Nuremberg, Bavaria, Germany
- Occupations: Entrepreneur, author and investor

Florian Roski (born September 22, 1974 in Nuremberg) is a German entrepreneur, business angel and former Mister Germany.

== Career ==
After graduating from high school, in 1995 Roski started studying business administration at the Friedrich-Alexander-University in Nuremberg. He graduated in 2001 and worked in various companies as an investment controller, head of controlling and accounting.

In 2005, together with a partner, he founded the "four-quarters group", whose managing director and principal shareholder he is. The start-up consulting company of the group now operates under the name "four-quarters EXIST GmbH". Since 2008, Roski has also been a founder and managing director of "IKSOR GmbH" (Family Office & Business Angel) and since 2012 authorized representative of "mein-mikrofinanzierer GmbH", a state-accredited microfinance institution.

Since August 2012 he has been a lecturer at the ICN Business School Nuremberg and the Technical University Nuremberg Georg-Simon Ohm. During his teaching activities and in addition to his activities as Managing Director of the automotive supplier industry, Florian Roski also continued to educate himself and was studying abroad in Beijing (China) and graduated in December 2006 from the European University of Applied Sciences in Hamburg with the Master of Business Administration (MBA). In 2012 he obtained his doctorate in Business Administration (DBA) from the University of Surrey in England. Florian Roski is a volunteer student of immigrant students at the Nuremberg association "DEGRIN - Begegnung und Bildung in Vielfalt e.V.”

== Mister Germany ==
In 1999, Florian Roski took part in the election to Mister Germany. After first winning the title "Mister South Germany", he prevailed in Berlin in the election at the Estrel Festival Center against his remaining competitors and won the title "Mister Germany 1999".

== Awards ==
- The Panzerknacker Book Prize Winner (listener price)
- TOP CONSULTANT - The Best Consultants of the German middle class - 1st place 2016
- 5-Euro-Business - 1st place with the project "Lerntüte"

== Books ==
- Das 1x1 des Immobilien Millionärs. Education Punk, Nuremberg 2016, ISBN 978-3-95471-521-3.
- Warum Immobilien King sind - by Dr. Florian Roski. Education Punk, Nuremberg 2017, ISBN 978-3-9817888-3-9.
- The ABC's of a Real Estate Millionaire: The German Way (English Edition), Nuremberg 2019, ISBN 978-3-9817888-4-6.
