= University of the Lagoons =

- Université des Lagunes
- Type: Private university
- Established: October 2010
- President: François Komoin
- Location: Abidjan, Ivory Coast
- Campus: Cocody Riviera Bonoumin
- Language: French
- Website: https://ulagunes.com/

The University of the Lagoons is a private university located in Abidjan, Ivory Coast.

== Description ==
The University of the Lagoons is a private higher education and research institution, created in Ivory Coast in 2010 by the International Center for Law Development (CIDD).

The university has benefited from the funding of various private actors, such as Total and Prosuma.

The educational project is focused on the comprehensive training of its students, ensuring excellent integration into professional life. This includes personalized training through academic support, ethical and anthropological training, mastery of English, cultural training (clubs for theater, music, cinema, etc.), sports, and mandatory internships starting from the second year.

The institution is non-denominational, but the chaplaincy of the University of the Lagoons is entrusted to Opus Dei, a personal prelature of the Catholic Church.

The University of the Lagoons won the African Moot Court Competition, held in Accra in 2018.

Valérie Pécresse is an honorary doctor (Doctor honoris causa) of the University of the Lagoons.

== Academic programs ==
- Faculty of Law: Business Law, Taxation, Maritime Law, Legal Advisor in Companies
- Faculty of Economics and Management: Logistics-Distribution, Banking-Finance-Insurance, and Audit-Control-Accounting
- Faculty of Science and Technology: Applied Mathematics, Mathematical Statistics, Operations Research, Decision Methods, Quantitative Finance, Risk Management

== Partnerships ==
- ICN Business School
- University Félix Houphouët-Boigny
- International University of Catalonia
- Catholic Institute of Toulouse
- University of Montpellier
