= Collected Works of Johann Christian Bach =

Complete edition of the works of Johann Christian Bach by Ernest Warburton

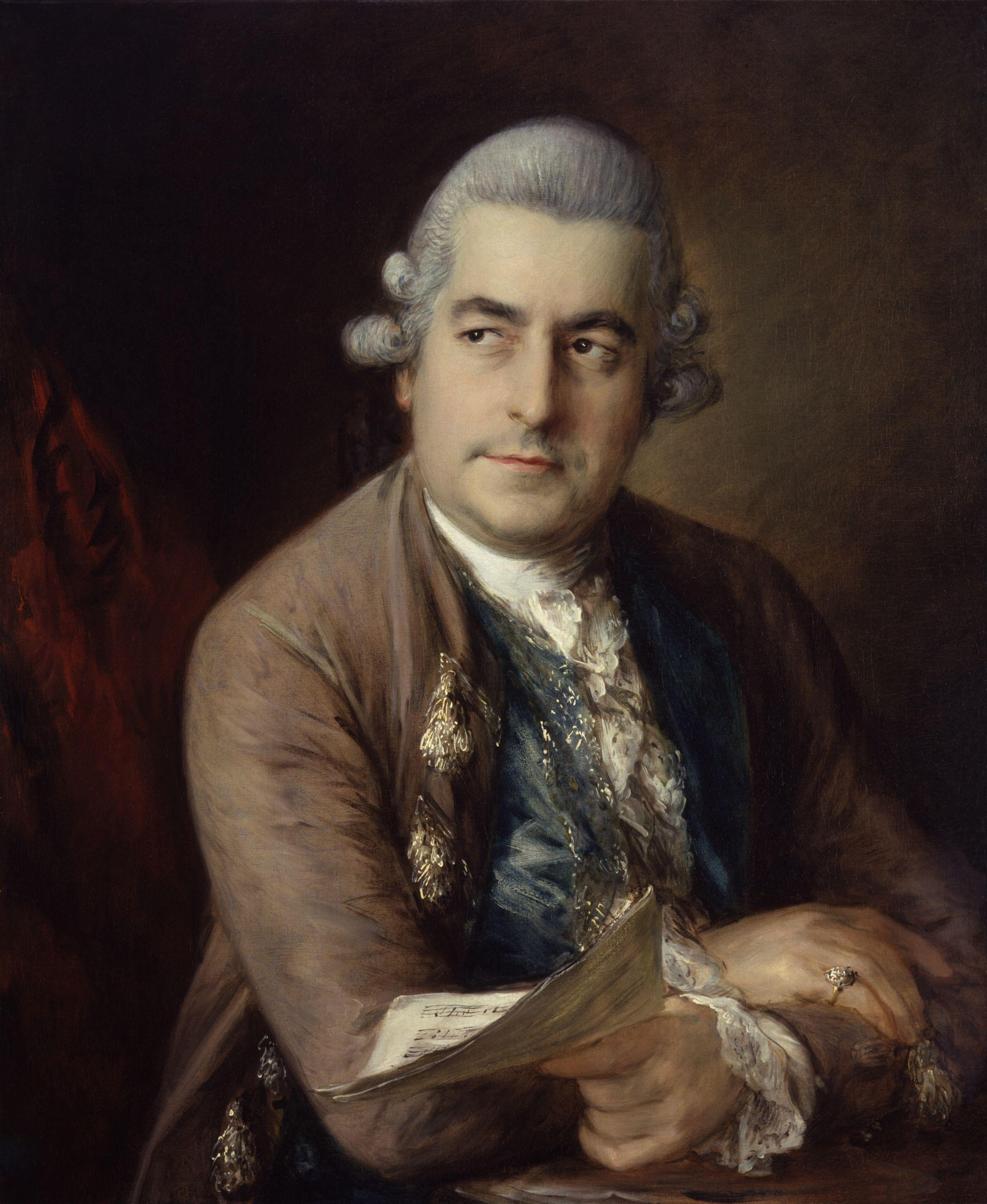
Portrait of Johann Christian Bach (1776)

The Collected Works of Johann Christian Bach is a 48-volume edition of the music of J.C. Bach published by Garland Publishing from 1984 to 1999. The general editor was the musicologist and J.C. Bach expert Ernest Warburton. Vol. 48 of the edition is a Thematic Catalog of this composer's work prepared by Warburton.

One notable feature of the edition is that it includes material which the obituary of Warburton in The Musical Times described as "drawn in Warburton's own elegant calligraphy." Rather than having scores set in musical type, much of the edition has been printed from scores transcribed by hand for the publication and then reproduced. It also includes some facsimiles of manuscript sources and librettos to vocal works by J.C. Bach.

Noted music scholar Richard Maunder (best known for his completion of Mozart's Requiem) also contributed to the edition.

== Sources ==
- Obituary of Ernest Warburton (retrieved 28 Feb 2011 from archive.org).
- Summary of a review of the edition by Sterling E. Murray
