= Masséré Touré =

Ivorian politician

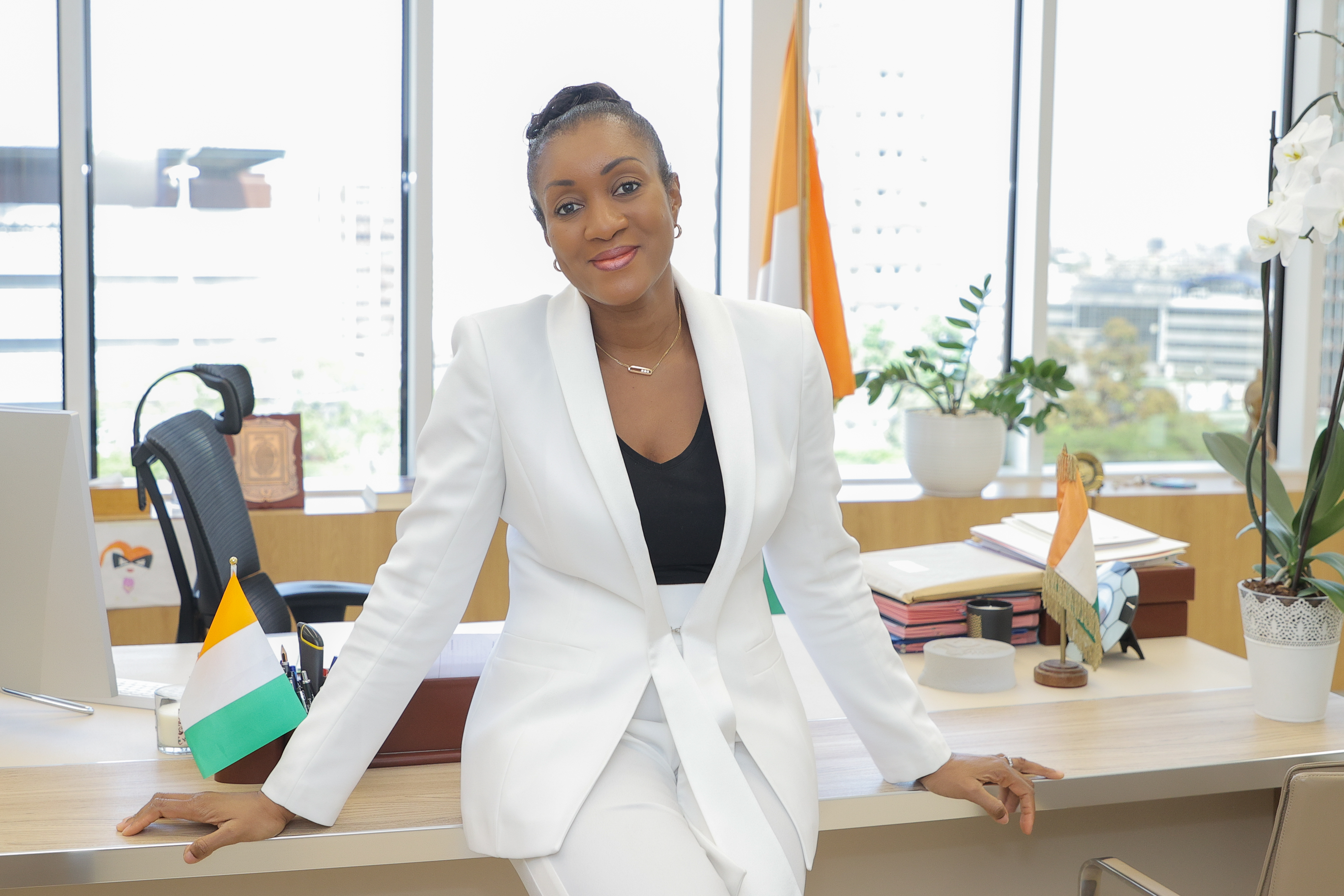
Masséré Touré (2023)

Masséré Touré-Koné (born 1974) is an Ivorian politician who since 2006 has supported her uncle, Alassane Ouattara, who was elected president in 2010. Since then, she has held various government positions in communications and finance, culminating in her appointment as Deputy Secretary General of the Ivorian Presidency in January 2022.

== Early life and education ==
Born on 30 August 1974 in Abidjan, Masséré Touré studied marketing and management in France at the ICN Business School in Nancy. She also earned a master's degree in languages from the University of Clermond-Ferrand.

== Career ==
In 1999, Touré joined Jeune Afrique Media Group in Paris where she worked on advertising and communications in connections with Jeune Afrique and Afrique magazine. She returned to the Ivory Coast in 2006, embarking on her political career. In particular, she supported her uncle Alassane Ouattara, acting as communications officer in the 2010 presidential campaign. She also benefitted from her marriage to Bruno Koné who became a government minister.

Outtara was elected president in 2010. In 2015, he established a communications department headed by Touré who until then had coordinated communications for the printed press. As director, she became responsible to developing the president's communications strategy and has managed relations with the media. Touré was appointed to the board of the news publishing enterprise Fraternité Matin in 2015 and to that of Radiodiffucion Télévision Ivorienne (RTI) in 2019.

In January 2022, Ouattara promoted Touré to the post of Deputy Secretary General of the Ivorian Presidency.

== Awards ==
In 2020, Masséré Touré was honoured as a Commander of the Order of Merit for her contribution to communications.
