= Didier Talpain =

French conductor and diplomat

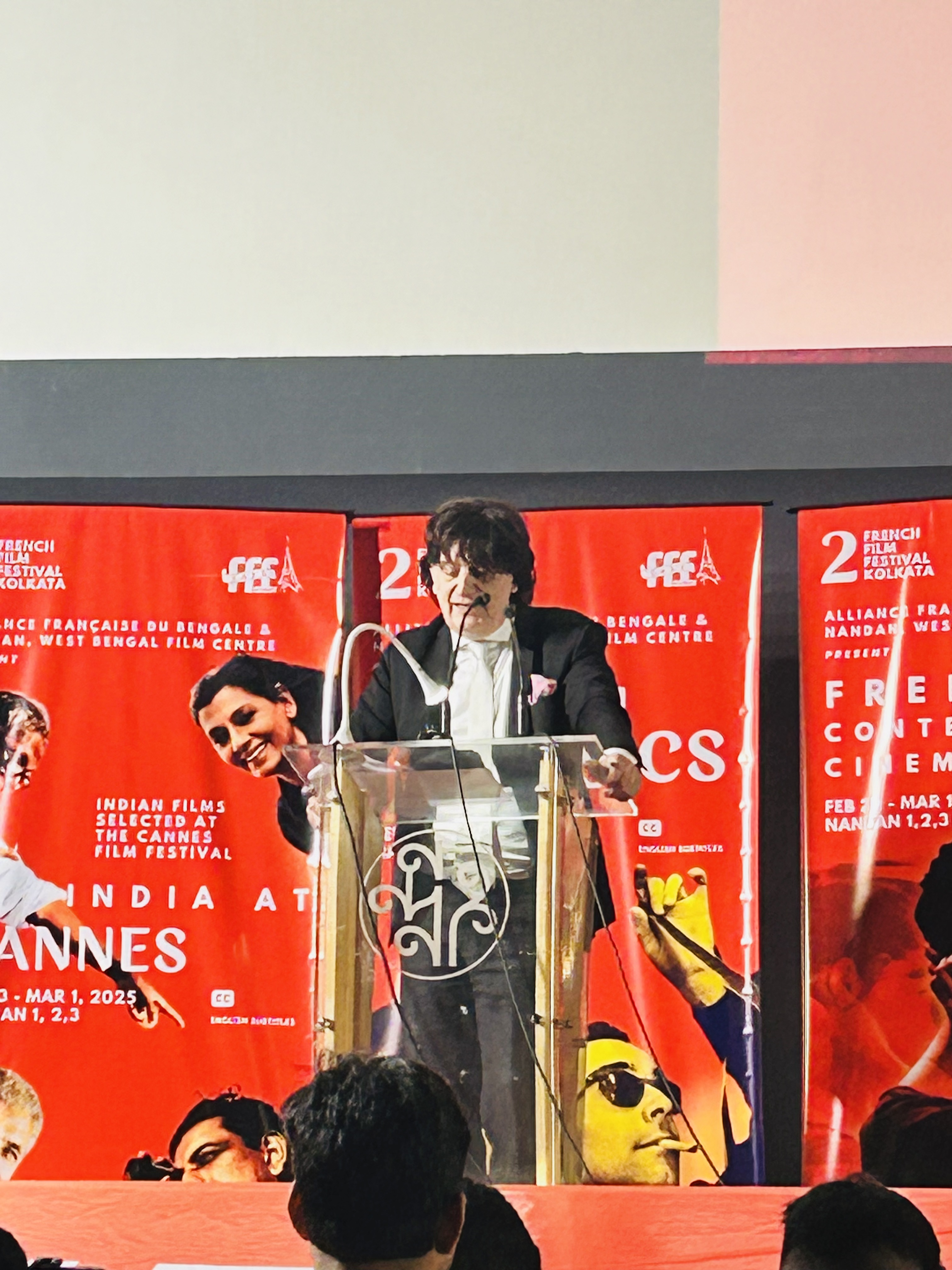
- Didier Talpain in 2025
- Born: 29 February 1960 (age 66)
- Education: Institut Commercial de Nancy
- Occupations: French conductor and Diplomat

Didier Talpain is a French conductor and diplomat.

== Diplomatic career ==
Talpain graduated from the Institut Commercial de Nancy and in political studies from the Institut d'études politiques de Strasbourg. He has primarily served in cultural exchange projects with the countries, such as Poland, he has been assigned.

== Musical career ==
Talpain studied flute, bassoon and chamber music at the École Normale de Musique de Paris, and conducted at the Conservatoire National Supérieur de Musique et de Danse de Paris (CNSMDP) in Paris. In 1985 he won a Menuhin Foundation prize and in 1995 the prize from the Perrenoud Foundation.

== Selected performances and discography ==
Talpain is noted for working with the Institut français to recover forgotten French operas.

- Offenbach Les Mesdames de la Halle - unrecorded
- Johann Nepomuk Hummel, Mathilde de Guise. Kristine Gailite, Philippe Do, Pierre-Yves Pruvot, Hjördis Thébault, Choir Alea, Solamente Naturali 2CD 2010
- Georges Bizet, Le Docteur Miracle 2010.
- Georges Bizet, Don Procopio, Opéra comique 2003
- J. C. Bach. Amadis de Gaule - (Ediciones Singulares, limited edition of 3000 copies, 2012)
