= Ernest Warburton (musicologist) =

English musicologist (1947–2001)

Ernest Warburton (10 June 1937 in Irlam – 7 August 2001 in London) was a noted musicologist who specialized in the music of Johann Christian Bach. His efforts were published from 1984 to 1999 in the 48 volumes of The Collected Works of Johann Christian Bach.

Warburton was also an executive with BBC Radio, serving as Head of Music Programmes (1977–1982) and Editor of Music for BBC Radio 3 (1982–1986) before transferring to the BBC World Service. During this period, he revived many obscure operas, such as Wagner's Die Feen and Rienzi and Puccini's Le Villi.

As general editor of The Collected Works of Johann Christian Bach, Warburton not only edited a share of the music, but wrote out the scores printed in the edition in his own calligraphy.

== Early career ==
=== Teaching ===
After obtaining his BA at Oxford in 1959, Warburton was unable to stay there to complete his DPhil, due to lack of funds. In 1960, he started work as a music teacher at Queen Mary's Grammar School for Boys, Basingstoke, Hants. Warburton continued working at Queen Mary's Grammar School until 1964, when he completed his DPhil. His thesis was on the operas of Johann Christian Bach, and although it was interrupted at the time due to lack of funds, the completed result became the basis for his catalogue of the composer's works.

His persona as a schoolteacher was much as described in one of his obituaries: “Although feared by some for his acerbic tongue — unleashed only on those who fell below the high standards he set himself and required from others — he was a companionable and humorous man, long-suffering and often highly entertaining.” Warburton was known to severely admonish his school choir at Queen Marys'immediately before a concert, likening them to a “bunch of wet cod on a slab”. His greatest achievement while at the school was to direct a production of Bach's St Matthew Passion at the town Parish Church. This production involved his own school choir, the choir of the Girls’ High School, and some professional soloists.

While Warburton was later known as “the white tornado” on account of his striking platinum blond hair (he had albinism), the boys’ nickname for him at the school was simply “Omo” (after the contemporary washing powder which was “whiter than white”).

From 1964 to 1967 he was Director of Music at Bishop's Stortford College before moving to the BBC.

=== BBC ===
Upon moving to the BBC in Manchester, he became head of music within three years. In 1967, he produced his first broadcast opera, Puccini's Le Villi. In 1977, he moved to London as the BBC's Head of Music Programmes for radio. In 1986, he was appointed music organiser for the World Service, then managing editor, and later editor, BBC World Service, English. He retired in 1995.

Under Warburton's supervision, the BBC recorded the first three operas of Richard Wagner – Die Feen, Das Liebesverbot and Rienzi. The last was a huge undertaking, as a majority of the music was thought to only exist in vocal score and had to be subsequently orchestrated by Edward Downes. Warburton then discovered a portion of the autograph score in the archives of the British Museum. Eventually, all six hours of the music were reconstructed and the recording project included both the Hallé and the Royal Philharmonic Orchestra.

As Warburton developed into the doyen of Johann Christian Bach scholarship, he was requested to become the musicological adviser for a series of recordings on CPO of the composer's symphonies and concertos, for which he also provided liner notes. During the 1970s, he also supervised a handful of recordings of Bach's keyboard concertos for Philips Records with pianist Ingrid Haebler.

== Sources ==
- "Ernest Warburton". The Musical Times. 142 (1877): 8. Winter 2001. JSTOR 1004571.
