= Ibolya Verebics =

Hungarian opera singer (born 1962)

Ibolya Verebics (born in 1962 in Győr) is a Hungarian soprano. Since 1986, she has been a member of the Hungarian State Opera.
