= Jeanne-Hippolyte Devismes =

French composer (1770–1836)

Jeanne-Hippolyte Devismes (née Moyroud, 4 January 1770 — 12 January 1836) was a French composer.

Born in Lyon, she studied the piano with Daniel Steibelt and married the director of the Académie Royale de Musique (the Paris Opéra), Jacques de Vismes. Her only known works are a song, "La Dame Jacinthe", and an opera, Praxitėle, ou la ceinture, which was first staged at the Paris Opéra on 24 July 1800. The work was a success and ran for 16 performances. The score has not survived complete. Devismes died in Caudebec-en-Caux.
