= Trishaan Sarkar =

- Occupation(s): Actor, casting director

Trishaan Sarkar is an Indian actor and casting director. He acted in Indian films including Shershaah and Gold.

As a casting director he is known for films including Ludo, Chaman Bahaar, and the web series Special OPS.
