= Jacques de Vismes =

Anne-Pierre-Jacques de Vismes, or Devismes, (1745, Paris – 1819, Caudebec-en-Caux) was a French writer and administrator.

Closely associated with the powerful interests of the Ferme Générale (Tax Farm), he managed to get himself appointed head of the Académie Royale de Musique in 1778 with the support of his sister, Adélaïde de Vismes, lady-in-waiting of Queen Marie Antoinette and the wife of the influential former fermier-general, Jean-Benjamin de La Borde. His attempts to reform this aging institution that was the Paris Opera faced continued opposition from the artistic staff. In 1780, financial difficulties finally brought him down and the opera was put under direct and permanent guardianship of royal power through the Menus-Plaisirs du Roi.

== Biography ==
Anne-Pierre-Jacques de Vismes du Valgay was the son of Martin de Vismes, secrétaire du roi, and Louise Legendre. He had two brothers: Joseph de Vismes, a soldier, and Alphonse de Vismes, a playwright, as well as one sister, Adélaïde de Vismes, who was a lady-in-waiting of Marie-Antoinette and married Jean-Benjamin de La Borde, first valet de chambre of Louis XV.

Vismes was Deputy Director of the tax farms when, in September 1777, he applied for the governance of the Royal Academy of Music. His proposal, which was accepted, was that he would give a bond of 500,000 livres tournois, the city of Paris would pay him an annual allowance of 80,000 livres tournois and that his privilege would last for twelve years.

He took over on 1 April 1778 and displayed great activity. In less than a year, he revived the main works of Lully, Rameau and Gluck, brought the first troupe of jesters ever heard in Paris, began to accustom the public to musical intermèdes by Paisiello and Anfossi and gave two operas by Piccinni, Roland and Atys.

The presentation of these two plays initiated a second phase of the guerre des bouffons, a storm of opposition to Vismes' attempts to reform the abuses that weakened the staging of opera. Partisans of Lully, Rameau and Gluck united against the new music, and the partisans of Piccini, although supported by the queen, were powerless to protect Vismes against the attacks of his enemies. Epigrams were followed by cabals; adherents powerful by their wealth or their position, the financier La Borde and agents of the minister Maurepas, encroached on his authority. When he offered to terminate his lease, the Conseil d'État accepted (19 February 1779), but he remained a director under the control of the provost. The intrigues did not stop, and the Conseil d'État, by a judgment of 7 March 1780, removed him from his position and withdrew the privilege of the Opera from the city, returning it to the king and stating that "Vismes did not possess the required knowledge."

Vismes returned to the Opera in 1799, as co-administrator. He became director on 18 March 1800 only to see his functions abolished by an order of 28 December that same year. He then retired to Normandy, where he died.

De Vismes wrote Pasilogie, ou la Musique considérée comme langue universelle; Paris, 1806, in 8°; Éléonore d’Amboise, duchesse de Bretagne, historical novel, Paris, 1807, 2 vol. in-12, Recherches nouvelles sur l’origine et la destruction des pyramides d’Égypte, suivies d’une Dissertation sur la fin du globe terrestre, Paris, 1812, in 8°.

He gave the Théâtre Montansier two opéras-comiques, la Double récompense, Eugène et Lanval, both presented in 1800.

He was the brother of playwright and librettist Alphonse de Vismes called Saint-Alphonse. His wife, Jeanne-Hippolyte Moyroud, born c. 1767 in Lyon, composed the music for Praxitèle, given at the Opéra in 1800.

== Sources ==
- Ferdinand Hoefer, « Anne-Pierre-Jacques de Vismes », Nouvelle Biographie générale, t. 46, Paris, Firmin-Didot, 1866, p. 298-9.
- Pitou, Spire (1985). The Paris Opera: An Encyclopedia of Operas, Ballets, Composers, and Performers. Rococo and Romantic, 1715–1815. Westport, Connecticut: Greenwood Press. ISBN 9780313243943.

Preceded by Pierre Montan Berton	Director of Académie Royale de Musique; 1777–1780	Succeeded by Pierre Montan Berton, Antoine Dauvergne, François-Joseph Gossec
Preceded by Louis-Joseph Francœur	Commissioneer of Théâtre des Arts; 1799–1801	Succeeded by Jacques Cellerier
