= Alphonse de Vismes =

Alphonse-Marie-Denis de Vismes (or Devismes), called Saint-Alphonse, (1746 in Paris – 18 May 1792, id.) was an 18th-century French playwright and librettist.

== Biography ==
The brother of writer and musicographer Jacques de Vismes du Valgay, Saint-Alphonse was an artillery officer before becoming cabinet reader of Prince of Condé and general director of the farms.

Making literature his leisure, he was a member of the Académie de Dijon. He gave the Académie royale de musique Les Trois Âges de l’Opéra, music by Grétry (1778), revised in Amadis de Gaule, an opera by Quinault on a music by Johann Christian Bach (1779), L’Heureuse Réconciliation (1785), Rosanie (1780) and Eugénie et Linval, ou le Mauvais Fils (1798).

== Sources ==
- Ferdinand Hoefer, « Alphonse-Marie-Denis de Vismes », Nouvelle Biographie générale, t. 46, Paris, Firmin-Didot, 1866, (p. 301).
