= ICN Business School =

French business school in Nancy, France

- Institut commercial de Nancy (ICN)
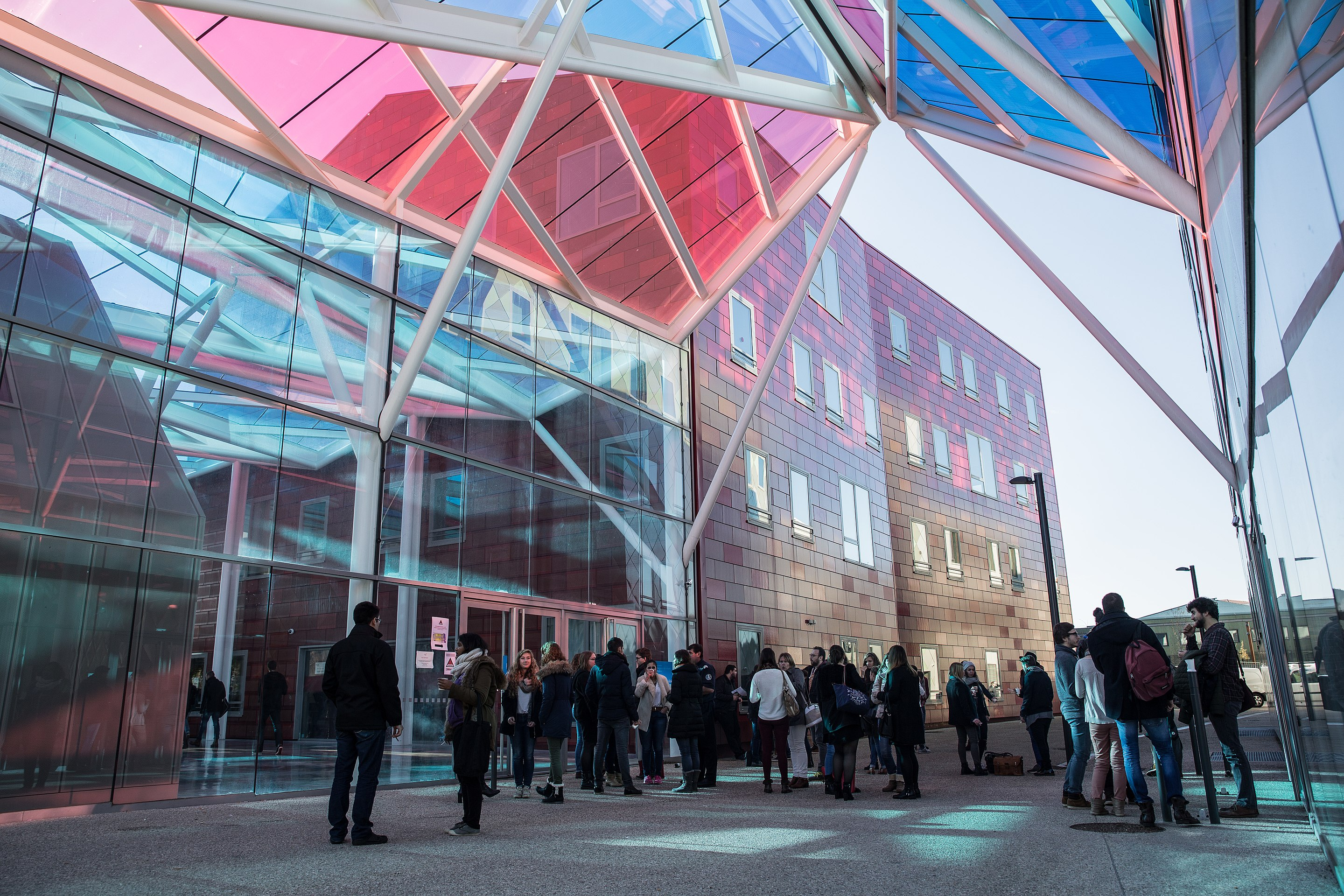
- Nancy ARTEM campus
- Type: Grande école de commerce et de management (Private research university Business school)
- Established: 1905; 121 years ago
- Accreditation: Triple accreditation: AACSB; AMBA; EQUIS
- Academic affiliations: Conférence des Grandes Écoles; Université de Lorraine; Alliance Artem
- President: Benoît Zimmermann
- Dean: Florence Legros
- Academic staff: 70; 95% PhD.; 55% female; 61% international
- Students: 3,000; 38% international
- Location: Nancy, Paris, Nuremberg, Berlin
- Language: English-only & French-only instruction
- Website: www.icn-artem.com/en

ICN Business School is a Grande Ecole of management (selective higher education institutions, which provide high-level training) triple accredited AACSB, EQUIS and AMBA. Associated with the University of Lorraine, the school is authorized to issue a diploma targeted by the Ministry of Higher Education and Research for its programs (Bac+3 for Bachelor in Management degree and Bac+5 for the Master in Management program-Grande Ecole). Founded in 1905 in Nancy, the school now has four campuses: two in France (Nancy and Paris La Défense) and two in Germany (Nuremberg and Berlin). Association law of 1901 non-profit, ICN Business School is labeled EESPIG by the French state.

== History ==
The school has been created in 1905 as Institut commercial de Nancy (ICN) by the Chambre de commerce et d'industrie de Meurthe-et-Moselle.

- In 1999, The National Graduate School of Art in Nancy, ICN Business School and Nancy Mines founded the Artem Alliance (Art, Technology, Management)
- In 2003, the “Institut Commercial de Nancy” becomes ICN Business School, a state-recognized private higher education institution associated with the University of Lorraine.
- In 2017, the three ARTEM Alliance schools are all located on the same campus, the Artem campus.
- In 2018, ICN makes its first intake to the Paris campus
- In 2019, ICN makes its first intake to the Berlin campus
- In 2019, ICN Business School creates Station A, a physical place but also a place of intelligence open to the world

== Grande école degrees ==
ICN Business School is a grande école, a French institution of higher education that is separate from, but parallel and often connected to, the main framework of the French public university system. Grandes écoles are elite academic institutions that admit students through an extremely competitive process, and a significant proportion of their graduates occupy the highest levels of French society. Similar to Ivy League schools in the United States, Oxbridge in the UK, and C9 League in China, graduation from a grande école is considered the prerequisite credential for any top government, administrative and corporate position in France.

The degrees are accredited by the Conférence des Grandes Écoles and awarded by the Ministry of National Education (France). Higher education business degrees in France are organized into three levels thus facilitating international mobility: the Licence / Bachelor's degrees, and the Master's and Doctorat degrees. The Bachelors and the Masters are organized in semesters: 6 for the Bachelors and 4 for the Masters. Those levels of study include various "parcours" or paths based on UE (Unités d'enseignement or Modules), each worth a defined number of European credits (ECTS). A student accumulates those credits, which are generally transferable between paths. A Bachelors is awarded once 180 ECTS have been obtained (bac + 3); a Masters is awarded once 120 additional credits have been obtained (bac +5). The highly coveted PGE (Grand Ecole Program) ends with the degree of Master's in Management (MiM)

The Business School has the triple accreditation: EQUIS, AMBA and AACSB.

== Rankings ==
In 2023, the Financial Times ranked its Masters in Management program 36th in the world.

In the ranking of the best Masters in Management by the Financial Times], ICN Business School has gained 2 places and is now ranked 10th French school after preparatory classes, 36th out of 100 schools worldwide.

In the Figaro Etudiants 2020 ranking] of business schools, the school moved up 3 places to become the 14th school after preparatory classes. In the international ranking of the best schools, ICN is ranked 13th school after preparatory classes.

In the Financial Times‘ European Business Schools ranking], ICN gained 2 places and is now tied for 13th French school after preparatory classes among 95 schools worldwide.

In L’Etudiant 2020 ranking] of business schools, ICN moved up one place to 14th school after preparatory classes. In Challenges' 2020 after preparatory classes business school ranking], ICN moved up one place to 16th. The school made strong progress on the diversity criterion, for which ICN gained 5 places and ranks 12th. The school maintained its 7th place on the international criterion. In the 2020 ranking of master's degrees from the Grandes Ecoles de Commerce du Point, ICN Business School continues its progression by gaining one place and is ranked 14th school after preparatory classes. The school distinguishes itself on the international criterion on which it progressed by 2 places and is tied with HEC for 8th place. In terms of pedagogy, the school is tied for 4th place with ESCP Europe BS and EM Lyon BS.

In the ranking of business schools that deliver a Master 2020 degree from Le Parisien / Aujourd’hui en France, ICN continues to progress and gained one place: it is now ranked 14th after preparatory classes. Le Parisien also publishes a series of subcategory in which ICN stands out in terms of the proportion of double degrees in which the school is ranked 2nd, just behind ESCP.

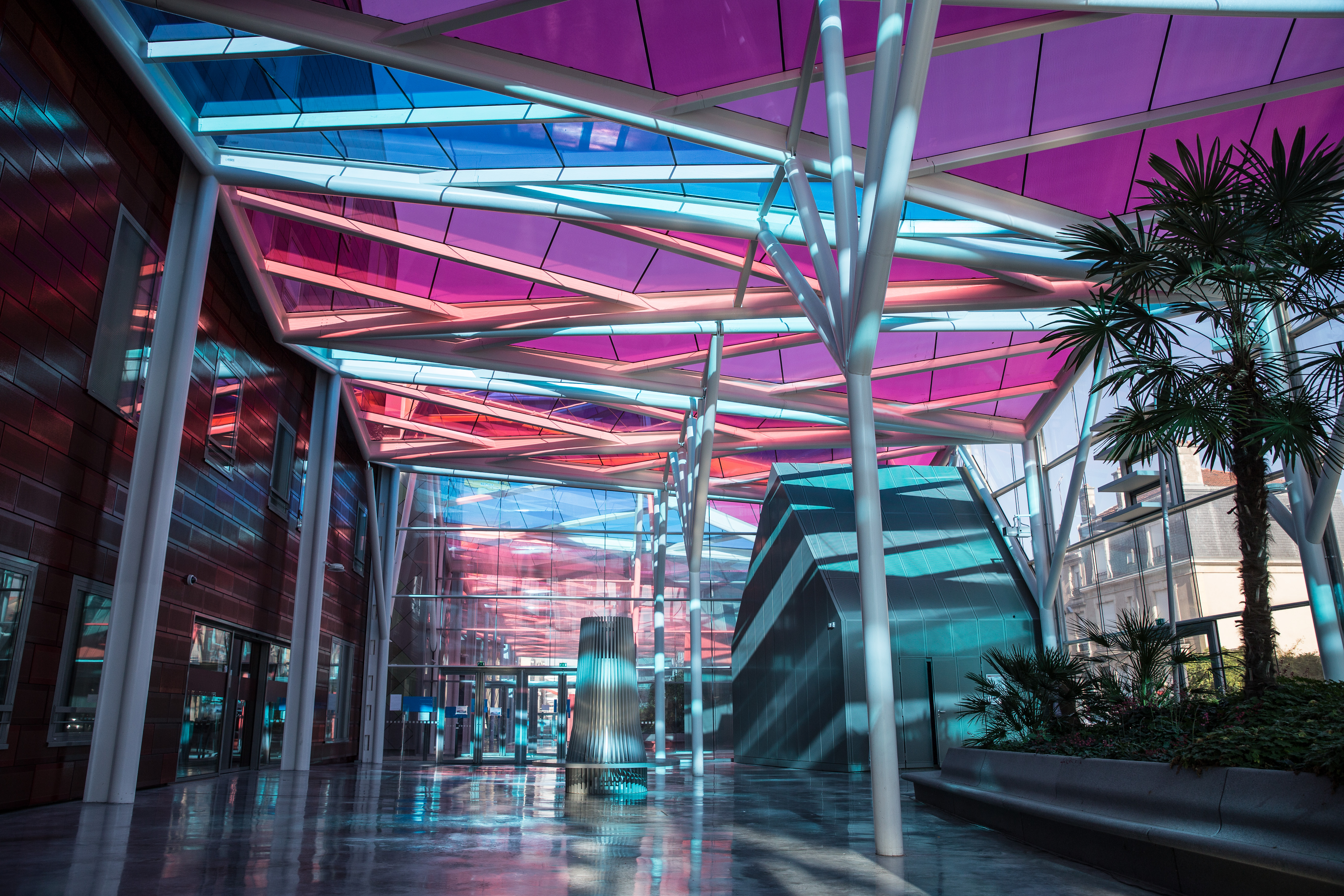
Nancy ARTEM Campus

== Research ==
ICN research focuses on important and challenging issues facing business and society, advances management practice, and forms the basis for effective engagement with professionals.

- Research laboratories - The laboratories of the University of Lorraine are a cornerstone of the ICN research. Faculty and students connect to extensive resources in order to engage in innovative joint research, and in the dissemination and transfer of results.
- UNESCO Chair - develops research oriented towards the transformation of mentalities from a perspective of responsibility and sustainability.

=== Alliance Artem ===
Created in 1999, Alliance Artem integrates three Grande ecoles on one campus: ICN Business School, École nationale supérieure d'art et de design de Nancy (ENSAD Nancy) (National Graduate School of Art in Nancy), and École nationale supérieure des mines de Nancy (Mines Nancy) (Nancy School of Mines). The Alliance promotes transdisciplinary learning, creativity and innovation, to train a new generation of decision-makers and creators.

ARTEM combines 3,500 students, 300 Faculty teachers and researchers, and 150 technical and administrative support staff on one campus. Its goal is to bring together different disciplines (business, art, engineering) and cultures in order to provide students a fully immersive experience that leads to different ways of thinking and challenges which would normally be outside their area of expertise.

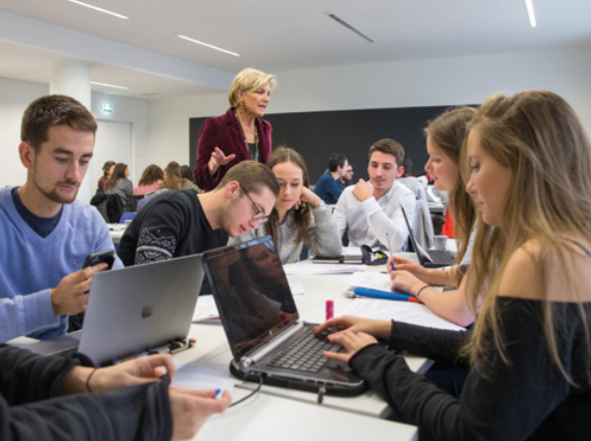
Station A

=== Station A ===
Continuing its mission and strategy, ICN Business School creates Station A[rt, Technology and Management], an ambitious project that combines an experimental laboratory for pedagogy and transdisciplinary academic research and an innovative and technological space, the Moving Lab, promoting experiential learning.

== Notable alumni ==
The school relies on a network of more than 17,000 graduates worldwide, according to the ICN Alumni directory. It has about 20 alumni in Who's Who. Among the school's alumni are:

- Isabelle Rauch, Member of Parliament for the Moselle
- Nicolas Thévenin (1981), archbishop of the Catholic Church
- Masséré Touré (1998), politician woman from Ivory Coast
- Daniel Kablan Duncan, Vice-President of the Republic of Ivory Coast
- Jean-Pierre_Thomas, French politician
- Jacques Cordonnierr, French politician
- Didier Talpain, French conductor and diplomat
- Jean-Michel Guillon, French business executive, President of the ASM Clermont Auvergne
- Gilane Barret, reporter BFMTV
