= Portrait of Johann Christian Bach =

Painting by Thomas Gainsborough

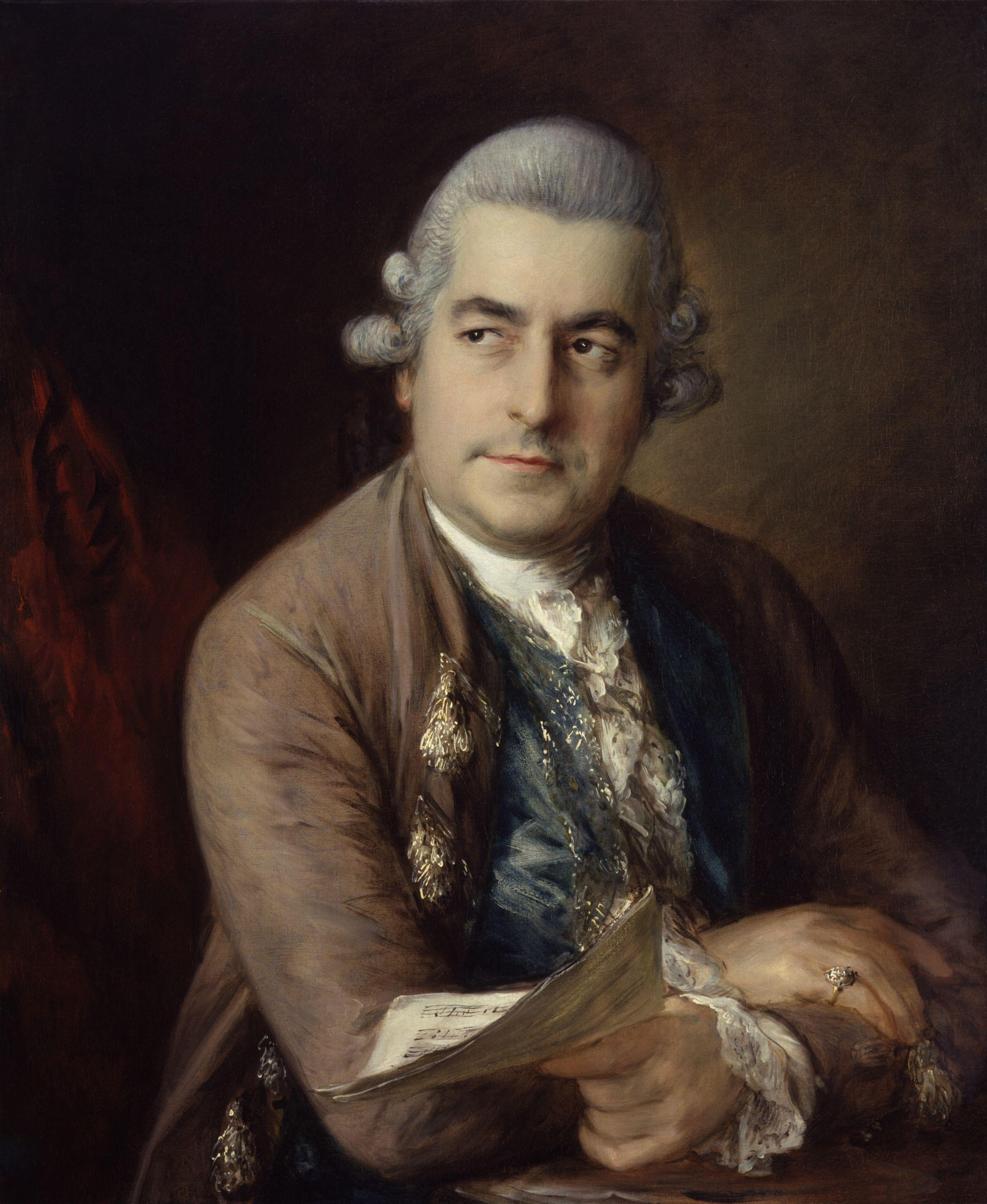
- Artist: Thomas Gainsborough
- Year: 1776
- Type: Oil on canvas, portrait painting
- Dimensions: 75.5 cm × 62 cm (29.7 in × 24 in)
- Location: National Portrait Gallery; London

Portrait of Johann Christian Bach is an oil on canvas portrait painting by the British artist Thomas Gainsborough, from 1776.

== History and description ==
The sitter is a German-born composer who hailed from the Bach family, a prominent musical dynasty which included his father Johann Sebastian Bach. Because of his long-standing residence in Britain he became known as the "English Bach". Bach is depicted seated, while holding a sheet of music on his right hand, while looking at the left.

Gainsborough was based in the fashionable city of Bath between 1759 and 1774 concentrating on portraits of society figures as well as leading artists and musicians, before he relocated to London where he continued his practice. He was a friend of Bach and when a painting was required of him for a gallery of prominent musicians in Bologna for Giovanni Battista Martini, Bach chose his English friend to produce the portrait. Bach commissioned a second version for himself. Today this version is held in the National Portrait Gallery, in London, having been acquired in 1983.

== Bibliography ==
- Asfour, Amal & Williamson, Paul. Gainsborough's Vision. Liverpool University Press, 1999.
- Hamilton, James. Gainsborough: A Portrait. Hachette UK, 2017.
- Ingamells, John. National Portrait Gallery Mid-Georgian Portraits, 1760–1790. National Portrait Gallery, 2004.
- Kamen, Henry. Who's Who in Europe 1450-1750. Taylor & Francis, 2003.
