= Johann Christian Bach =

German composer (1735–1782)

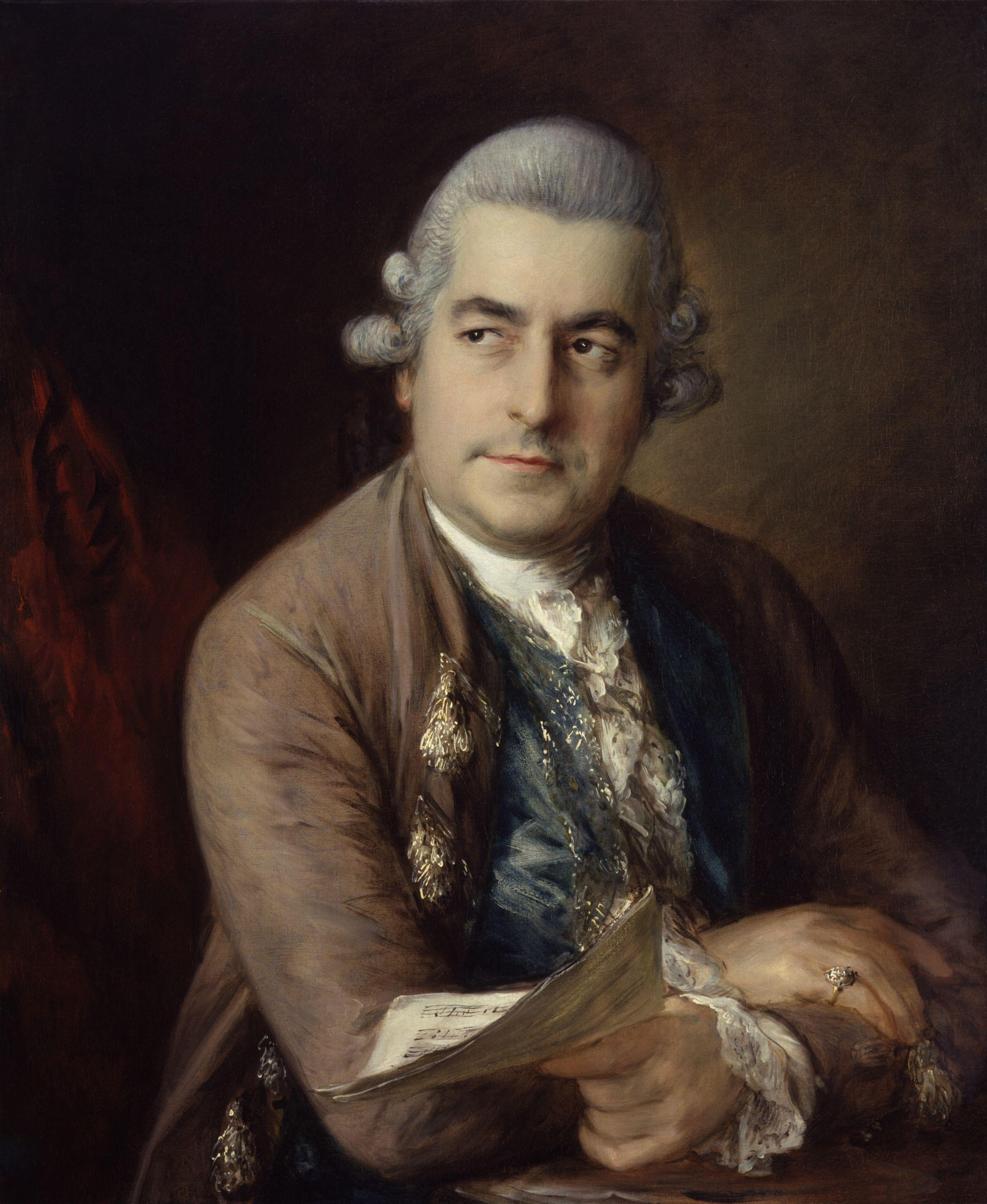
- Portrait of Johann Christian Bach (1776)
- Born: 5 September 1735; Leipzig
- Died: 1 January 1782 (aged 46); London, England
- Parent(s): Johann Sebastian Bach; Anna Magdalena Bach

Johann Christian Bach (5 September 1735 – 1 January 1782) was a German composer of the Classical era and the youngest son of Johann Sebastian Bach.

Bach received his early musical training from his father, and later from his half-brother, Carl Philipp Emanuel Bach in Berlin. After his time in Berlin he made his way to Italy to study with the famous Padre Martini in Bologna. While in Italy, J.C. Bach was appointed as an organist at the Milan Cathedral. In 1762 he became a composer to the King’s Theatre in London where he wrote a number of successful Italian operas and became known as "The English Bach," as well as "John Bach."

Bach is responsible for the development of the sinfonia concertante form. He became one of the most influential figures of the classical period, influencing compositional styles of prolific composers like Joseph Haydn and Wolfgang Amadeus Mozart. There are two others named Johann Christian Bach in the Bach family tree, but neither was a composer.

== Life ==
Johann Christian Bach was born to Johann Sebastian and Anna Magdalena Bach in 1735 in Leipzig, Germany. His father, Johann Sebastian Bach, instructed him in his early musical training. After his father's death, he moved to Berlin to pursue his studies with his half-brother Carl Philipp Emanuel Bach, who was twenty-one years his senior and, at the time, was considered to be the most musically gifted of Bach's sons.

J. C. Bach's memorial, St Pancras Churchyard, London

In 1754 he moved to Italy to study with Padre Martini in Bologna. He was appointed as an organist at Milan Cathedral in 1760. During his time in Italy, he converted from Lutheranism to Catholicism, supposedly due to political reasons. He devoted most of his time composing church music, including music for a Requiem Mass and a Te Deum and Latin Mass settings. His first major work was a Mass, which received an excellent performance and acclaim in 1757. In 1762, Bach travelled to London to première three operas at the King's Theatre, including Orione on 19 February 1763. In 1764 or 1765, the castrato Giusto Fernando Tenducci, who became a close friend, created the title role in his opera Adriano in Siria at King's.

That established his reputation in England, and he became music master to Queen Charlotte. In 1766, Bach met soprano Cecilia Grassi (1746-1791), who was eleven years his junior, and married her shortly thereafter. They had no offspring. J. C. Bach performed symphonies and concertos at the Hanover Square Rooms. This was London's premier concert venue in the heart of fashionable Mayfair. The surrounding Georgian homes offered a well-to-do clientele for his performances. One of London's primary literary circles, which included Jane Timbury, Charles Burney, Robert Gunnell Esq., Lord Beauchamp, and the Duchess of Buccleuch, was acquainted with Bach, and members were regular attendees at his events.

In 1777, he won a landmark case, Bach v Longman, which established that (in English law) copyright law applied to musical scores. Even before then, Bach demanded a proper credibility for his compositions almost at the same time upon his arrival to London in 1762. He was granted an exclusive right to publish his music for 14 years.

By the late 1770s, both his popularity and finances were in decline. By the time of Bach's death on New Year's Day 1782, he had become so indebted (in part due to his steward embezzling his money), that Queen Charlotte stepped in to cover the expenses of the estate and provided a life pension for Bach's widow. He was buried in the graveyard of St. Pancras Old Church, London.

== Works ==
The works of J. C. Bach are given 'W' numbers, from Ernest Warburton's Thematic catalog of his works (New York City: Garland Publishing, 1999). Bach's compositions include eleven operas, as well as chamber music, orchestral music and compositions for keyboard.

== Legacy ==
Sinfonia in G minor, Op. 6, No. 6
I. Allegro
Performed by Camerata Budapest, Hanspeter Gmur (conductor), courtesy of Naxos Records

In the fourth volume of Charles Burney's General History of Music there is an account of J. C. Bach's career.

In 1764, Bach met Wolfgang Amadeus Mozart, who was eight years old during the Mozart family grand tour. Bach then spent five months teaching Mozart in composition. Bach is widely regarded as having a strong influence on the young Mozart, with scholars such as Téodor de Wyzewa and Georges de Saint-Foix describing him as "The only true teacher of Mozart". In particular, Mozart's partiality to wind instruments in his early symphonies was influenced by Bach, who believed that wind instruments should carry their own melodic material rather than merely doubling other instruments. In his later years, Mozart "often acknowledged the artistic debt he owed" to Johann Christian. Mozart arranged three sonatas from Bach's Op. 5 into keyboard concertos, and the theme of the slow movement of his Piano Concerto No. 12 contains a reference to the overture of Bach's opera, La calamita de cuori. Upon hearing of Bach's death in 1782, Mozart commented, "What a loss to the musical world!"

J.C. Bach is responsible for developing a distinct Classical musical form known as the Sinfonia concertante. This genre emerged from the Baroque concerto grosso. Sinfonia concertante influenced many of Bach's contemporaries, such as Mozart and Haydn, and served as a framework for subsequent compositions.

The Bach-Abel concerts were a series of public concerts that eventually gave rise to modern concert series. The concerts were created in collaboration with his friend, the German virtuoso viola da gamba player Carl Friedrich Abel. These concerts began at Abel's residence, but an increase in popularity led to them being held at larger venues. They featured new works by Bach and Abel, as well as newer musical artists such as Haydn, giving them a platform to present their works on a public stage. Because these concerts required a subscription, they cultivated a regular audience by having audience members prepay for that season's concert series. Furthermore, the Bach-Abel concerts enabled the middle class to gain greater access to live classical music. Previously, live music performances were limited to private, aristocratic settings; however, these subscription concerts were made available to the wider public, allowing middle-class people to engage in the arts and society. The Bach-Abel concerts decreased in popularity and ended due to changing musical tastes and Bach's death.
