= Armida (Haydn) =

Dramma eroico by Joseph Haydn

- Opera by Joseph Haydn
- Portrait of the composer by Thomas Hardy, in 1791, when Haydn composed the work, his last opera
- Language: Italian
- Based on: Torquato Tasso's Gerusalemme liberata
- Premiere: 26 February 1784; Esterháza court theatre

Armida (Hob. XXVIII/12) is a 1784 opera (dramma eroico) in three acts by Austrian composer Joseph Haydn, set to an Italian-language libretto taken from Antonio Tozzi's 1775 opera Rinaldo, as amended by Nunziato Porta, and ultimately based on the story of Armida and Rinaldo in Torquato Tasso's poem Gerusalemme liberata (Jerusalem Delivered).

== Libretto ==
The text of Nunziato Porta's libretto for Haydn's Armida was principally taken from Antonio Tozzi's opera Rinaldo, first performed during Ascension 1775 at the Teatro San Salvatore in Venice with a libretto by an unknown adapter that was chiefly based on an Armida written by Jacopo Durandi and set to music by Pasquale Anfossi for Turin in 1770 (see List of operas by Pasquale Anfossi) and Antonio Sacchini for Milan in 1772 (see Armida (Sacchini)). Rinaldo also incorporated elements from Niccolò Jommelli's opera Armida abbandonata, first performed in 1770 at the Teatro San Carlo in Naples with a libretto by Francesco Saverio De Rogati, who had adapted it from his earlier drama based on Tasso's Gerusalemme liberata. Jommelli's opera featured ballet, chorus, and machine spectacle. A recitative in Act 3, relating Rinaldo's visit to the enchanted forest of Armida, was set by several other composers before it was included in Haydn's opera. Rinaldo also incorporated material from Giovanni Bertati's libretto for Johann Gottlieb Naumann's 1773 opera Armida that was also used in Haydn's version.

== Performance history ==
The first performance of Haydn's Armida was 26 February 1784, and it went on to receive 54 performances from 1784 to 1788 at the Esterháza Court Theatre. During the composer's lifetime it was also performed in Pressburg, Budapest, Turin and Vienna. Haydn himself regarded Armida as his finest opera. Armida then disappeared from the general operatic repertoire; it was revived in 1968 in a concert rendition in Cologne, and later a production in Bern. The United States premiere of the opera was given as part of the Monadnock Music Festival on the campus of Keene State College in New Hampshire on September 3 and 5, 1981. Sarah Reese sang the title role; the director Peter Sellars set the production during the Vietnam War. At the time of the Metropolitan Opera premiere of Nixon in China Sellars recalled how he was inspired with the idea for that opera while working on Armida.

== Roles ==
Role	Voice type	Premiere cast, 26 February 1784 (Conductor: Joseph Haydn)
Armida, a sorceress	soprano	Metilda Bologna
Rinaldo, a knight	tenor	Prospero Breghetti
Zelmira, accomplice of Armida	soprano	Costanza Valdesturla
Idreno, king of the Saracens	bass	Paolo Mandini
Ubaldo, friend of Rinaldo	tenor	Antonio Specioli
Clotarco, a knight	tenor	Leopoldo Dichtler

The work is scored for flute, two oboes, two clarinets, two bassoons, two horns/trumpets, timpani, strings, continuo.

== Synopsis ==
To prevent the capture of Jerusalem by the knights of the First Crusade, the Prince of Darkness has sent the enchantress Armida into the world to seduce the Christian heroes and turn them from their duty. The bravest of these, Rinaldo, has fallen under Armida's spell. She comes to love him so deeply that she cannot bring herself to destroy him.

=== Act 1 ===
Scene 1: A council chamber in the royal palace of Damascus. King Idreno is alarmed that the crusaders have crossed the Jordan River. The heathen sorceress Armida seems to have triumphed over the crusaders, but fears that her conquest is not complete without gaining the love of the Christian knight Rinaldo. Now Rinaldo is obsessed with Armida and promises to fight against his fellow Christians, if victorious King Idreno offers him the kingdom and Armida's hand. Armida prays for Rinaldo's safety.

Scene 2: A steep mountain, with Armida's fortress at the top. The knights Ubaldo and Clotarco plan to free Rinaldo from Armida's clutches. Idreno sends Zelmira, the daughter of the sultan of Egypt, to ensnare the Christians but on encountering Clotarco she falls in love with him and offers to lead him to safety.

Scene 3: Armida's apartments. Rinaldo admires the bravery of the approaching knights. Ubaldo warns Rinaldo to beware Armida's charms, and reproaches the dereliction of his duty as a Christian. Although remorseful, Rinaldo is unable to escape Armida's enchantment.

=== Act 2 ===
Scene 1: A garden in Armida's palace. Zelmira fails to dissuade Idreno from planning an ambush of the crusaders. Idreno pretends to agree to Clotarco's demand that the Christian knights enchanted by Armida be freed. Reluctantly, Rinaldo leaves with Ubaldo. Armida expresses her fury.

Scene 2: The crusader camp. Ubaldo welcomes Rinaldo, who prepares to go into battle. Armida begs for refuge and Rinaldo's love. Rinaldo departs for battle with Ubaldo and the other soldiers.

=== Act 3 ===
Scene 1: A dark, forbidding grove, with a large myrtle tree. Rinaldo, knowing that the tree holds the secret of Armida's powers, enters the wood intending to cut it down. Zelmira appears with a group of nymphs, and they try to get him to return to Armida. As he is about to strike the myrtle, Armida, dishevelled, appears from it and confronts him. Armida cannot bring herself to kill him; Rinaldo strikes the tree and the magic wood vanishes.

Scene 2: The crusader camp. The crusaders prepare for battle against the Saracens. Armida appears, swearing to pursue Rinaldo everywhere. As Rinaldo moves off, she sends an infernal chariot after Rinaldo.

== Music ==
Karl Geiringer has commented on how Haydn adopted the "principles and methods" of Christoph Willibald Gluck in this opera, and how the opera's overture alone encapsulates the opera's plot in purely instrumental terms.

Haydn's music for the opera also contains occasional echoes of Sarti's Giulio Sabino, played at Esterháza in 1783.

== Recordings ==
- 1978 – Jessye Norman (Armida), Claes H. Ahnsjö (Rinaldo), Norma Burrowes (Zelmira), Samuel Ramey (Idreno), Robin Leggate (Ubaldo), Anthony Rolfe Johnson (Clotarco) – Orchestre de Chambre de Lausanne, Antal Doráti – 2 CDs (Philips Records)
- 2000 - Cecilia Bartoli (Armida), Christoph Prégardien (Rinaldo), Patricia Petibon (Zelmira), Oliver Widmer (Idreno), Scot Weir (Ubaldo), Markus Schäfer (Clotarco) – Concentus Musicus Wien, Nikolaus Harnoncourt – 2 CDs (Teldec)
