= Clorinda (Jerusalem Delivered) =

Fictional character

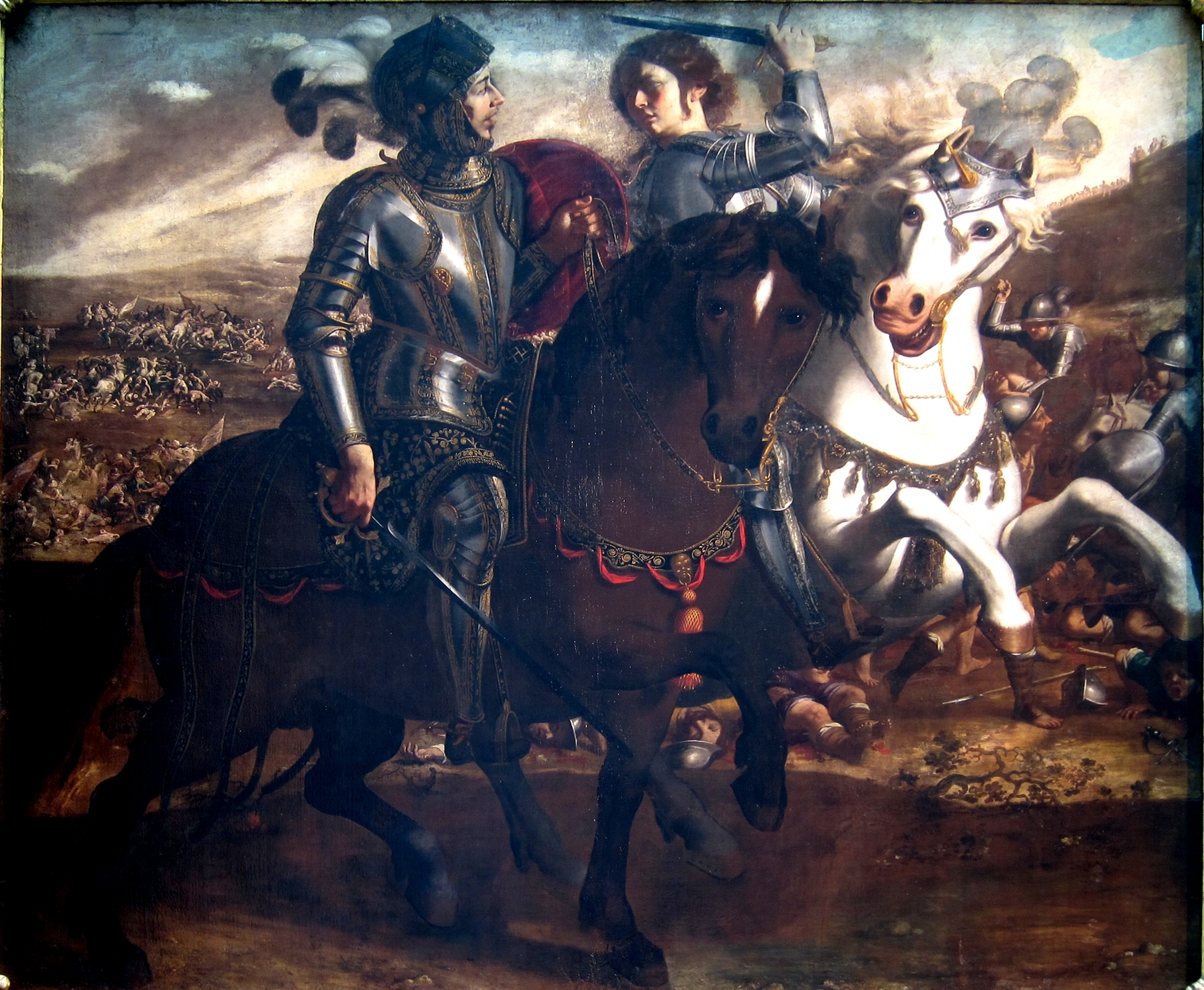
Clorinda attacks Tancredi, one of a series by Paolo Domenico Finoglia

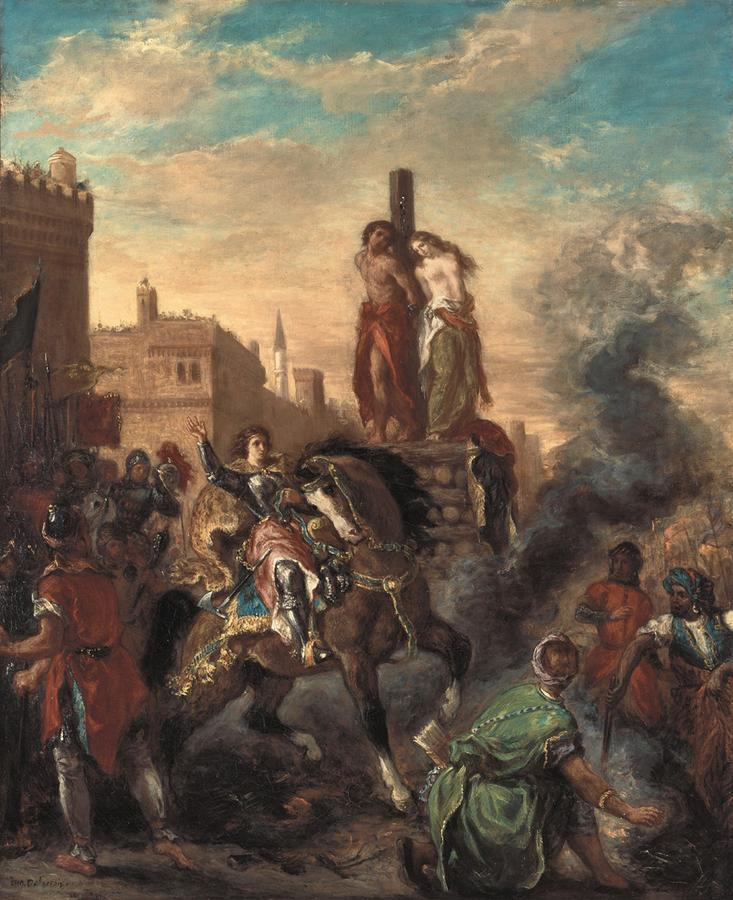
Clorinda Rescues Olindo and Sophronia by Eugène Delacroix, painting in the Neue Pinakothek.

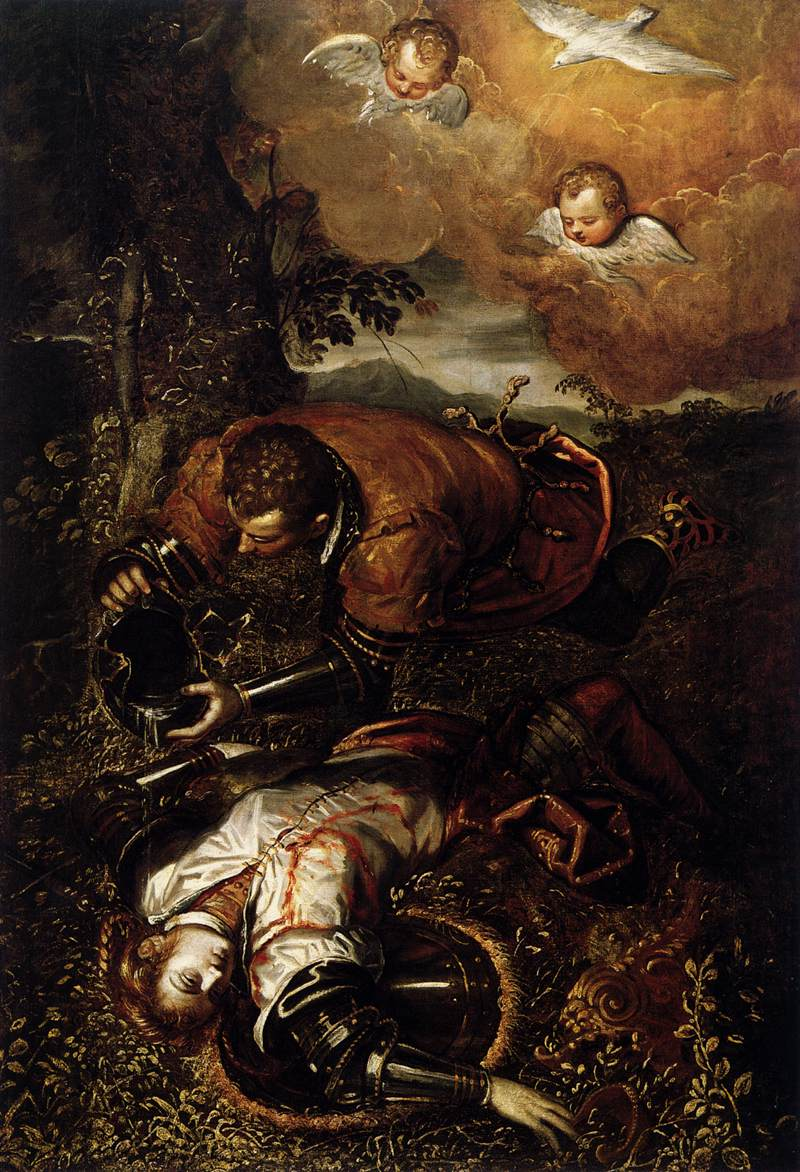
Tancredi Baptizing Clorinda by Domenico Tintoretto, c. 1585.

Clorinda is a fictional character appearing in Torquato Tasso's poem Jerusalem Delivered, first published in 1581. She is a warrior woman of the Saracen army.

First introduced in the second canto of the poem, when she rescues from execution Sofronia and Olindo, two Christian lovers of Jerusalem, she is next discovered under the command of the King of Jerusalem, Aladine, aiding that city's defences, together with the bold knight Argantes. Tancred saw her on the field and fell in love with her, thus refusing to do battle with her. Because of this, a lesser champion was sent out from the Christian hosts, and Clorinda slew him. Erminia, her companion, being herself enamoured of Tancred, then escaped Jerusalem in the guise of Clorinda, purposing to enter the Christian camp, but being surprised by a party of knights without, she fled and was lost in the forests.

Tancred falls in love with Clorinda in Canto 3. During a night battle in which she sets the Christian siege tower on fire, she is killed by Tancredi, who does not recognise her in her armour and the darkness. She converts to Christianity before dying (Canto 12). She is "the only convert whose experience of that transformation is detailed within Tasso's poem."

The character of Clorinda is inspired in part by Virgil's Camilla and by Bradamante in Ariosto; the circumstances of her birth (a Caucasian girl born to African parents) are modeled on the lead character (Chariclea) from Aethiopica, the ancient Greek novel by Heliodorus of Emesa.

== In the arts ==
Il combattimento di Tancredi e Clorinda is an operatic scena for three voices by Claudio Monteverdi, dramatising the final fight, first performed in 1624, and popular since the revival of interest in early music in the mid-20th century. Though the spate of 18th-century operas based on Tasso mostly covered different parts of the plot, especially the story of Armida, Clorinda was the first contralto role in French opera, in Tancrède, a tragédie en musique of 1702 by composer André Campra and librettist Antoine Danchet.

Clorinda's fight with Tancred and her conversion and death have also been popular subjects for visual artists, and in 2022 choreographer Shobana Jeyasingh premiered a dance piece, Clorinda Agonistes, based on the character.
