= Armida in Vain Endeavours with Her Entreaties to Prevent Rinaldo's Departure =

Painting by Angelica Kauffman

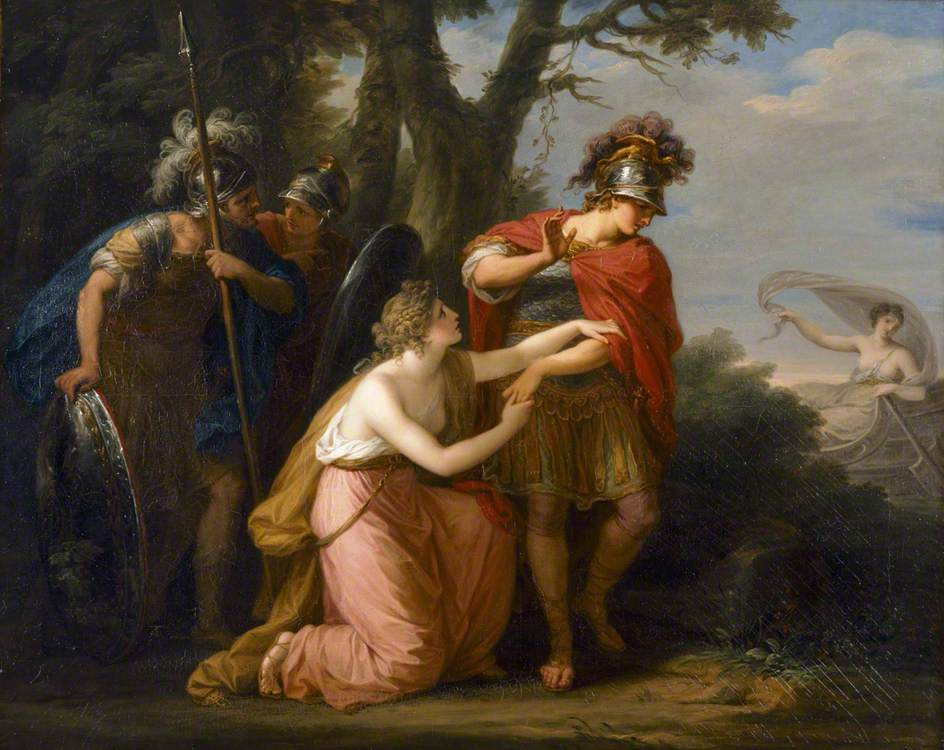
- Artist: Angelica Kauffman
- Year: c.1776
- Type: Oil on canvas, history painting
- Dimensions: 100.3 cm × 125.8 cm (39.5 in × 49.5 in)
- Location: Kenwood House; London

Armida in Vain Endeavours with Her Entreaties to Prevent Rinaldo's Departure is a 1776 Neoclassical history painting by the Swiss artist Angelica Kauffman. It features a scene from the sixteenth century epic poem Jerusalem Delivered by Torquato Tasso. The enchantresses Armida attempts to prevent the hero Rinaldo departing to take part in the Siege of Jerusalem during the First Crusade.

Kauffman returned to the poem as inspiration for her paintings several times, and had depicted works based on it at the Royal Academy Exhibition of 1772.

It was produced during Kauffman's time in Britain where she was a founded member of the Royal Academy. She displayed the work at the Royal Academy Exhibition of 1776 held at Pall Mall. Later acquired by the politician Lord Deramore it is today at Kenwood House in Highgate which acquired it in 1997.

== See also ==
- List of paintings by Angelica Kauffman

== Bibliography ==
- Alexander, David S. Angelica Kauffman: A Continental Artist in Georgian England. Reaktion Books, 1992.
- Bryant, Julius. Kenwood, Paintings in the Iveagh Bequest. Yale University Press, 2003.
- Moyle, Franny. Mrs Kauffman and Madame Le Brun: The Entwined Lives of Two Great Eighteenth-Century Women Artists. Bloomsbury Publishing, 2025.
