= Scot Weir =

American tenor (born 1955)

- Born: 1955 (age 69–70)
- Occupations: Operatic tenor; Academic teacher
- Organizations: Musiktheater im Revier; Hessisches Staatstheater Wiesbaden; Zurich University of the Arts; Hochschule für Musik Berlin

Scot Weir (born 1955) is an American lyric tenor in opera and concert, and an academic teacher who made a career in Europe. He has been a professor of voice at the Hochschule für Musik Berlin and Zurich University of the Arts

== Life ==
Born in 1955 in New Mexico, Weir sang in church choirs as a school boy, sometimes as a soloist. He studied music and voice at the University of Colorado Boulder. Weir attended a course in Graz, Austria, in 1980, which led to an engagement at the Musiktheater im Revier in Gelsenkirchen, Germany, from 1981 to 1985. He appeared there as Ottavio in Mozart's Don Giovanni, in the title role of Handel's Serse, as Lenski in Tchaikovsky's Eugen Onegin, and as Almaviva in Rossini's Barbiere. From 1985 to 1989, he was a member of the Hessisches Staatstheater Wiesbaden, where he added roles such as Belfiore in Mozart's La finta giardiniera and Veit in Lortzing's Undine to his repertoire.

In 1992, Weir made a guest appearance at La Monnaie in Brussels as Hylas in Les Troyens. In 1998, he performed the title role of Monteverdi's Il ritorno d'Ulisse in patria at both La Monnaie and the Wiener Festwochen. He also performed at the Vienna State Opera, Salzburg Festival, and in Amsterdam, Paris and Turin, among others.

Weir has been active in concert, known for lieder singing and for interpreting music by Johann Sebastian Bach. He worked with conductors such as Claudio Abbado, Charles Dutoit, Philippe Herreweghe, Charles Mackerras, Roger Norrington, Helmuth Rilling and Peter Schreier. In 2001, he performed Hans Zender's version of Schubert's song cycle Winterreise with chamber orchestra in a staged performance of the Hamburg Ballet, in a choreography by John Neumeier. In 2002, he sang both Schubert's original version and Zender's version in Winterthur, with pianist Burkhard Schaeffer.

Weir founded the Chama Music Festival in New Mexico in 1990. He lectured at U.S. universities and was an instructor at the Internationale Bachakademie Stuttgart from 1993 and a professor of voice at the Berlin Hochschule für Musik "Hanns Eisler". Weir has been a professor of voice and chamber music at the Zurich University of the Arts.

== Recordings ==
Weir's recordings include sacred music by Schubert, with the Mass No. 6. A reviewer noted his "sensitivity and impressive breath control". In 1997, he recorded the title role of Schubert's unfinished oratorio Lazarus in a completion by Edison Denisov. In 2000, he took part in a recording of Haydn's opera Armida, with the Concentus Musicus Wien conducted by Nikolaus Harnoncourt, alongside Cecilia Bartoli and Christoph Prégardien.
