= Rinaldo (cantata) =

1863 cantata by Johannes Brahms

- Cantata by Johannes Brahms
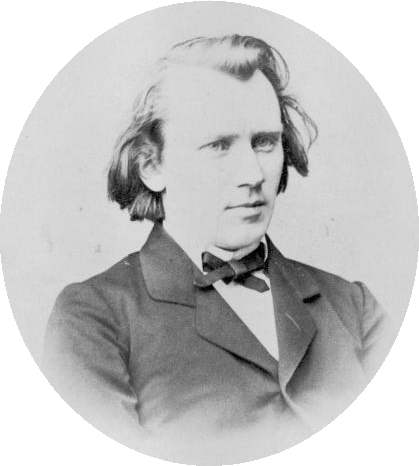
- The composer
- Opus: 50
- Text: Rinaldo by Johann Wolfgang von Goethe
- Language: German
- Composed: 1863, 1868
- Performed: 28 February 1869: Vienna
- Scoring: tenor; men's chorus; orchestra

Rinaldo, Op. 50, is a cantata for tenor solo, four-part male chorus and orchestra by German composer Johannes Brahms. It was begun in 1863 as an entry for a choral competition announced in Aachen. He chose as his text the dramatic poem of the same name by Johann Wolfgang von Goethe, which presents an episode from the epic Jerusalem Delivered by Torquato Tasso in the form of a series of dialogues between the knight Rinaldo, who has been enchanted by the witch Armida, and his fellow knights, who are calling him back to the path of duty.

The part of Armida is not sung as she makes only a silent appearance. Although the work was four-fifths completed in 1863, Brahms laid it aside and only finished it in 1868 after the success of his A German Requiem.

The work is scored for piccolo, two flutes, two oboes, two clarinets, two bassoons, two horns, two trumpets, three trombones, timpani, tenor solo, four-part men's chorus, and strings. A typical performance lasts between 36 and 40 minutes.

The premiere took place in Vienna on 28 February 1869 at a concert of the Akademischer Gesangverein. The composer conducted, with the tenor Gustav Walter, a student chorus numbering 300, and the Court Opera orchestra. Rinaldo was subsequently published as Brahms’ Op. 50. It has never been popular, but is interesting on a number of counts, not least because it may give the closest idea of what an opera by Brahms would have sounded like.
