= Rinaldo and Armida (Hayez) =

Painting by Francesco Hayez

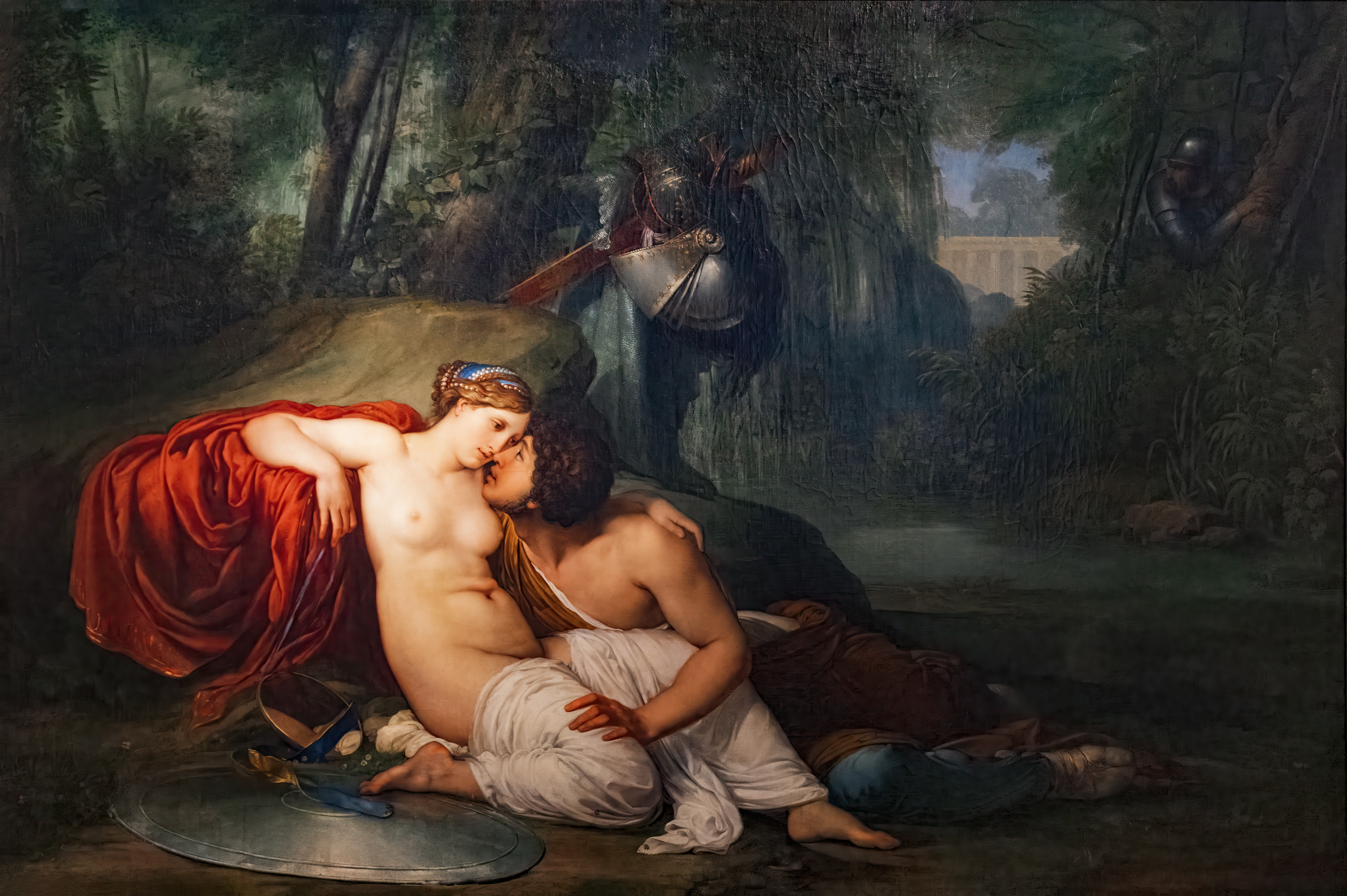
- Artist: Francesco Hayez
- Year: 1813
- Type: Oil on canvas, history painting
- Dimensions: 197,5 cm × 296.5 cm (778 in × 116.7 in)
- Location: Gallerie dell'Accademia; Venice

Rinaldo and Armida (Italian: Rinaldo e Armida) is an 1813 oil painting by the Italian artist Francesco Hayez. It depicts a scene inspired by the epic poem Jerusalem Delivered by Torquato Tasso. Set around the First Crusade to retake Jerusalem, portrays the encounter between Rinaldo and the Saracen witch Armida. It was an early work by Hayez who was one of the leading figures in the Romantic Movement in Italy, although this work is fully Neoclassical in style. Today it is in the collection of the Gallerie dell'Accademia in Venice, having been acquired when it was exhibited there by the artist in 1813.

== Bibliography ==
- Mazzocca, Fernando . Francesco Hayez: catalogo ragionato. F. Motta, 1994.
- Susinno, Stefano. Maestà di Roma: da Napoleone all'unità d'Italia. Universale ed eterna ; Capitale delle arti. Electa, 2003.
- Watts, Laura L. Italian Painting in the Age of Unification. Routledge, 2021.
