= Nicola Gliri =

Italian painter

Nicola Gliri (1630 -1687) (pronounced "Leary"), called in Latin Nicolaus Glirus, was an Italian Baroque painter active in the region of Apulia.

He was born in Bitonto, but his best known works were completed alongside Carlo Rosa for the Basilica di San Nicola in Bari. Both are said to have been pupils of Paolo Finoglio. The work was commissioned by the prior Giovanni Montero (1655-1674) and consisted of six lunettes in the crypt, with one signed 1660.

Gliri also painted a Madonna delle Sette Dolori with Saints Francis of Assisi and Francis Xavier (1684-1686) for the Cathedral of Ruvo.

Among his pupils was Vitantonio De Filippis.
