= Armida =

Fictional character created by Torquato Tasso

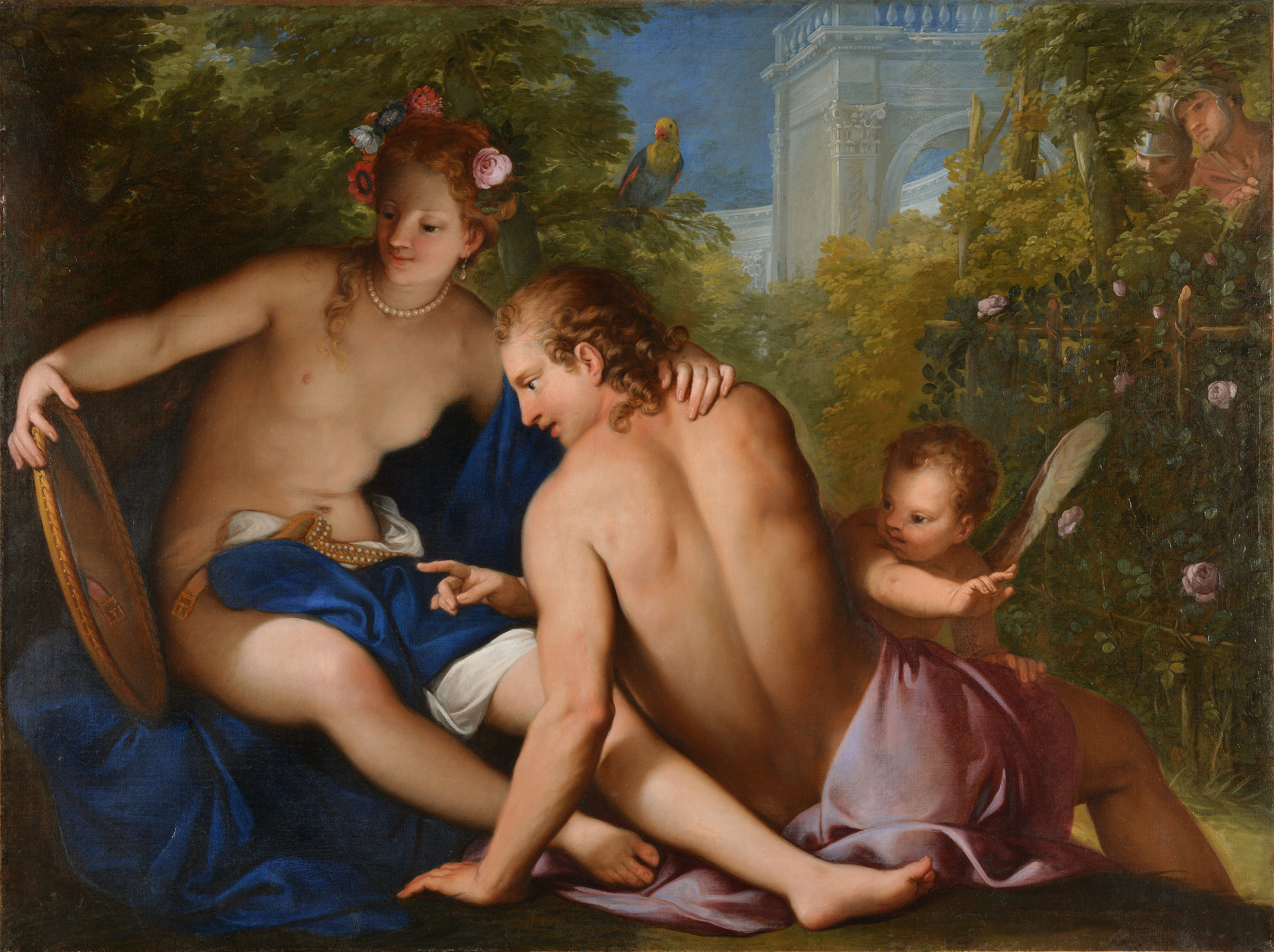
Rinaldo and Armida, Gregorio Lazzarini circa 1690.

Armida is the fictional character of a Saracen sorceress, created by the Italian late Renaissance poet Torquato Tasso.

== Description ==
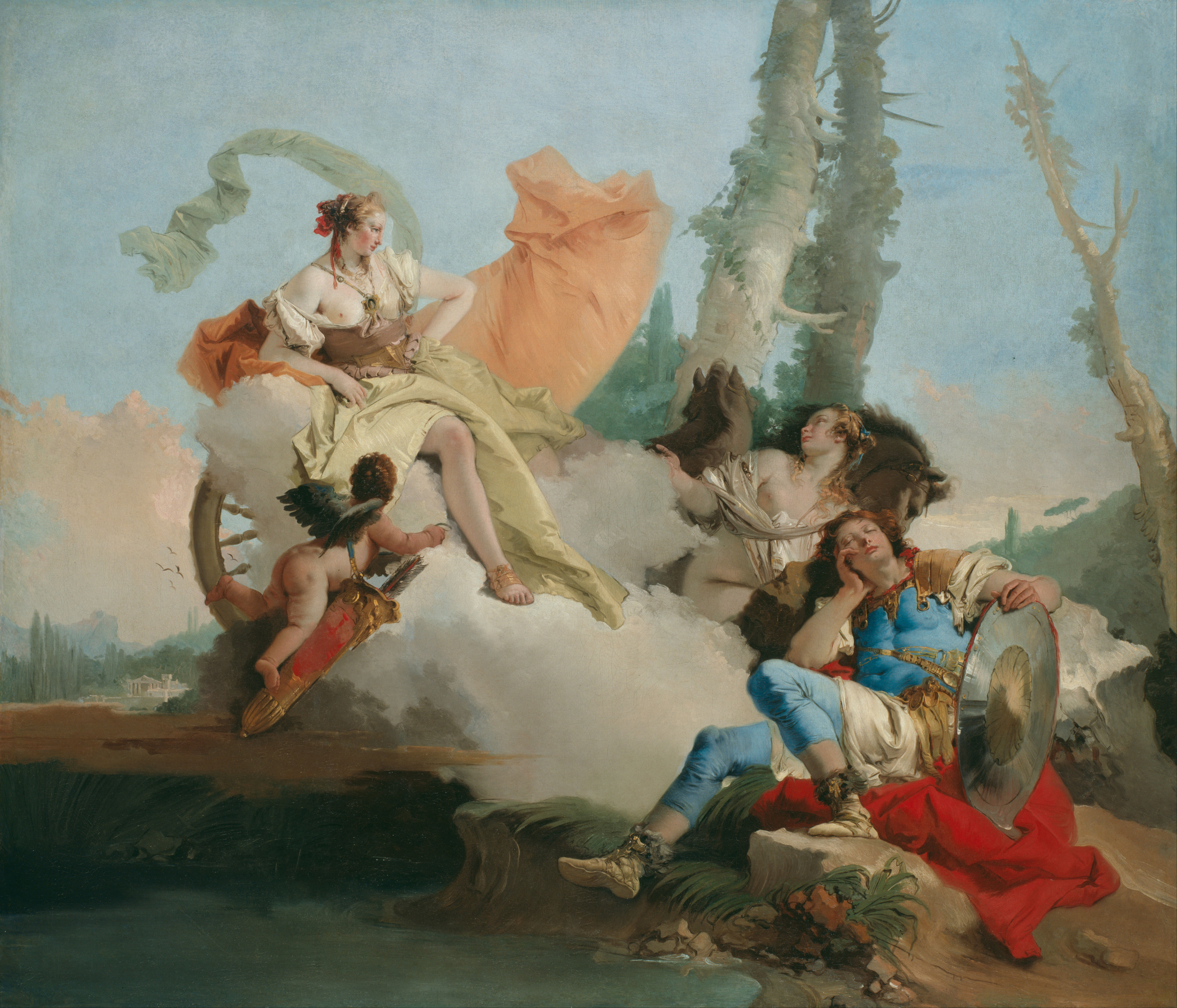
Rinaldo Enchanted by Armida, Giovanni Battista Tiepolo.

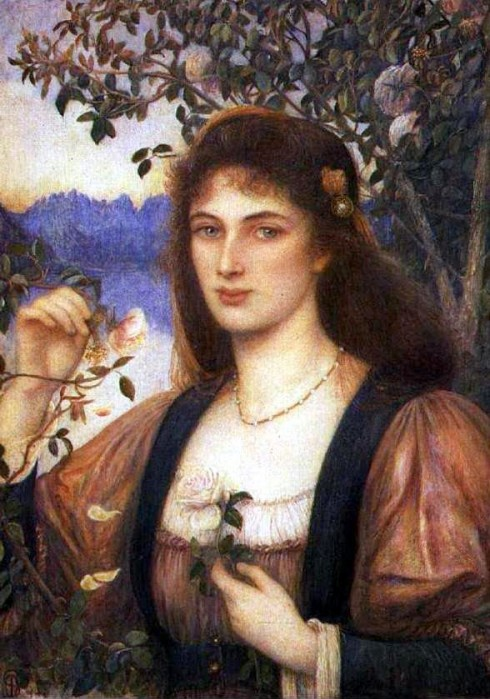
The Rose from Armida's Garden by Marie Spartali Stillman (1894)

In Tasso's epic Jerusalem Delivered (Italian: Gerusalemme liberata), Rinaldo is a fierce and determined warrior who is also honorable and handsome. Armida has been sent to stop the Christians from completing their mission and is about to murder the sleeping soldier, but instead she falls in love. She creates an enchanted garden where she holds him a lovesick prisoner. Eventually Charles and Ubaldo, two of his fellow Crusaders, find him and hold a shield to his face, so he can see his image and remember who he is. Rinaldo barely can resist Armida's pleadings, but his comrades insist that he return to his Christian duties. At the close of the poem, when the pagans have lost the final battle, Rinaldo, remembering his promise to be her champion, prevents her from giving way to her suicidal impulses and offers to restore her to her lost throne. She gives in at this and like the other Saracen woman, Clorinda, earlier in the piece, becomes a Christian and his "handmaid".

Many painters and composers were inspired by Tasso's tale. The works that resulted often added or subtracted an element; Tasso himself continued to edit the story for years. In some versions, Armida is converted to Christianity, in others, she rages and destroys her own enchanted garden.

She occupies a place in the literature of abandoned women such as the tragic Dido, who committed suicide, and the evil Circe, whom Odysseus abandoned to return home, but she is considered by many to be more human and thus more compelling and sympathetic than either of them.

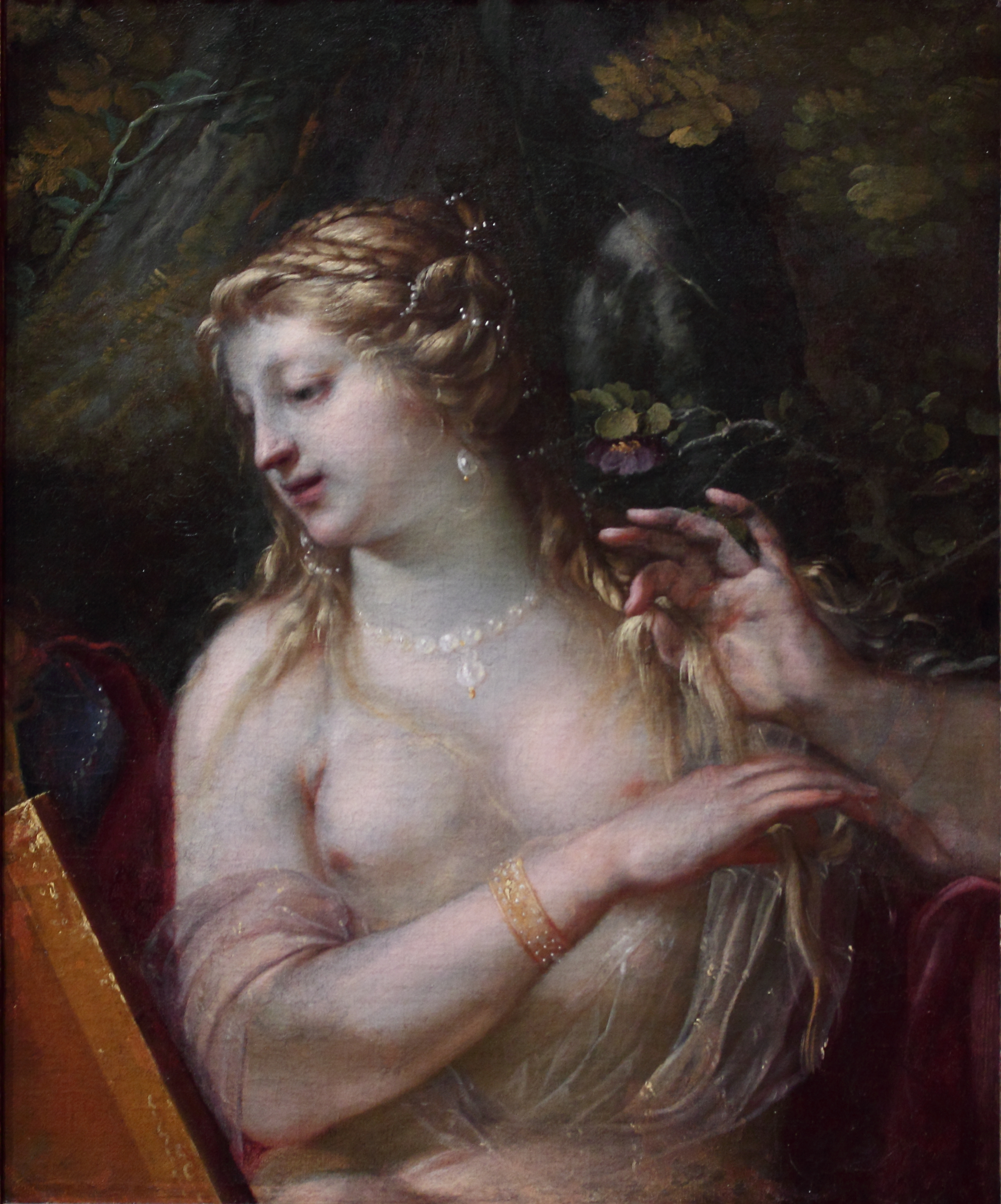
Armida by Jacques Blanchard, Museum of Fine Arts of Rennes.

== In opera ==
The story of Armida and Rinaldo has been the basis for a number of operas:

- Armida abbandonata (1627) by Claudio Monteverdi (lost)
- Armide (1686) by Jean-Baptiste Lully
- Rinaldo and Armida (1698) by John Dennis
- Rinaldo (1711) by George Frideric Handel
- Armida al campo d'Egitto (1718) by Antonio Vivaldi
- Armida (1761) by Tommaso Traetta
- Armida abbandonata (1770) by Niccolò Jommelli
- Armida (1771) by Antonio Salieri
- Armida (1772) by Antonio Sacchini
- Armide (1777) by Christoph Willibald von Gluck
- Armida (1780) by Josef Mysliveček
- Renaud (1783), also by Sacchini
- Armida (1784) by Joseph Haydn
- Armida e Rinaldo (1786) by Giuseppe Sarti
- Armida (1802) by Francesco Bianchi
- Armida (1817) by Gioachino Rossini
- Armida (1904) by Antonín Dvořák
- Armida (2005) by Judith Weir

On 1 May 2010, Rossini's Armida was performed and broadcast live to theaters around the world in the series MetLive in HD.

Johannes Brahms composed a cantata entitled Rinaldo based on the story.

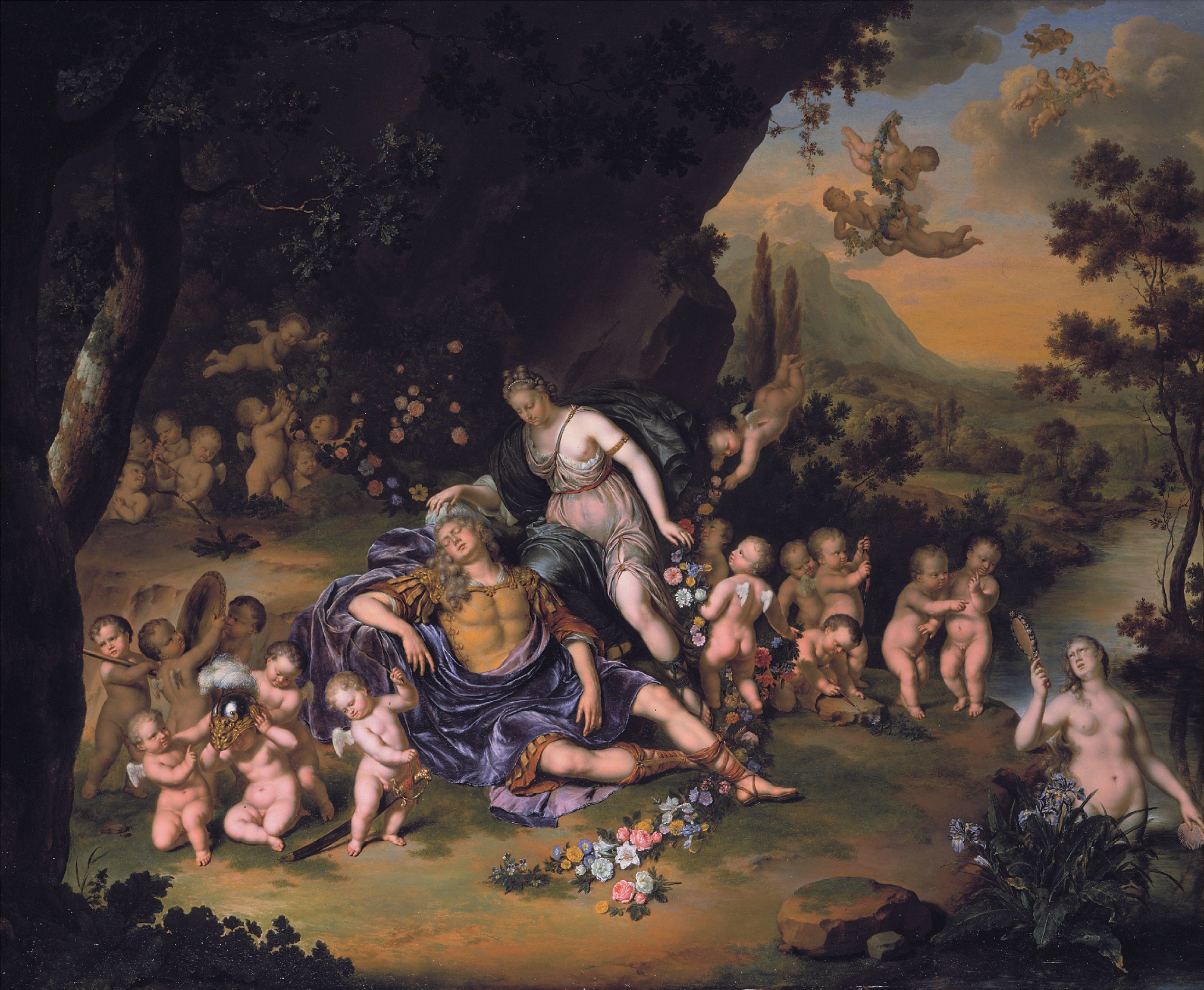
Rinaldo and Armida, Willem van Mieris (1709).

== Armida as a ballet ==
- Armida. Choreography by Jules Perrot. Music by Cesare Pugni. First performed by the Imperial Ballet at the Imperial Bolshoi Kamenny Theatre, St. Petersburg on 20 November [O.S. 8 November] 1855.
- Le Pavillon d'Armide. Choreography by Mikhail Fokine. Music by Nikolai Tcherepnin. First performed by the Imperial Ballet at the Imperial Mariinsky Theatre, St. Petersburg on 25 November [O.S. 12 November] 1907. Second premiere given by the Ballets Russes at the Théâtre du Châtelet, Paris on 19 May 1909.
- Rinaldo and Armida. Choreography by Frederick Ashton. Music by Malcolm Arnold. First performed by the Sadler's Wells Ballet at the Royal Opera House, Covent Garden, London on 6 January 1955.

== In film ==
- The anthology film Aria includes a ten-minute segment Jean-Luc Goddard directed that is a modern day, loosely based, version of Armide.

== Gallery ==
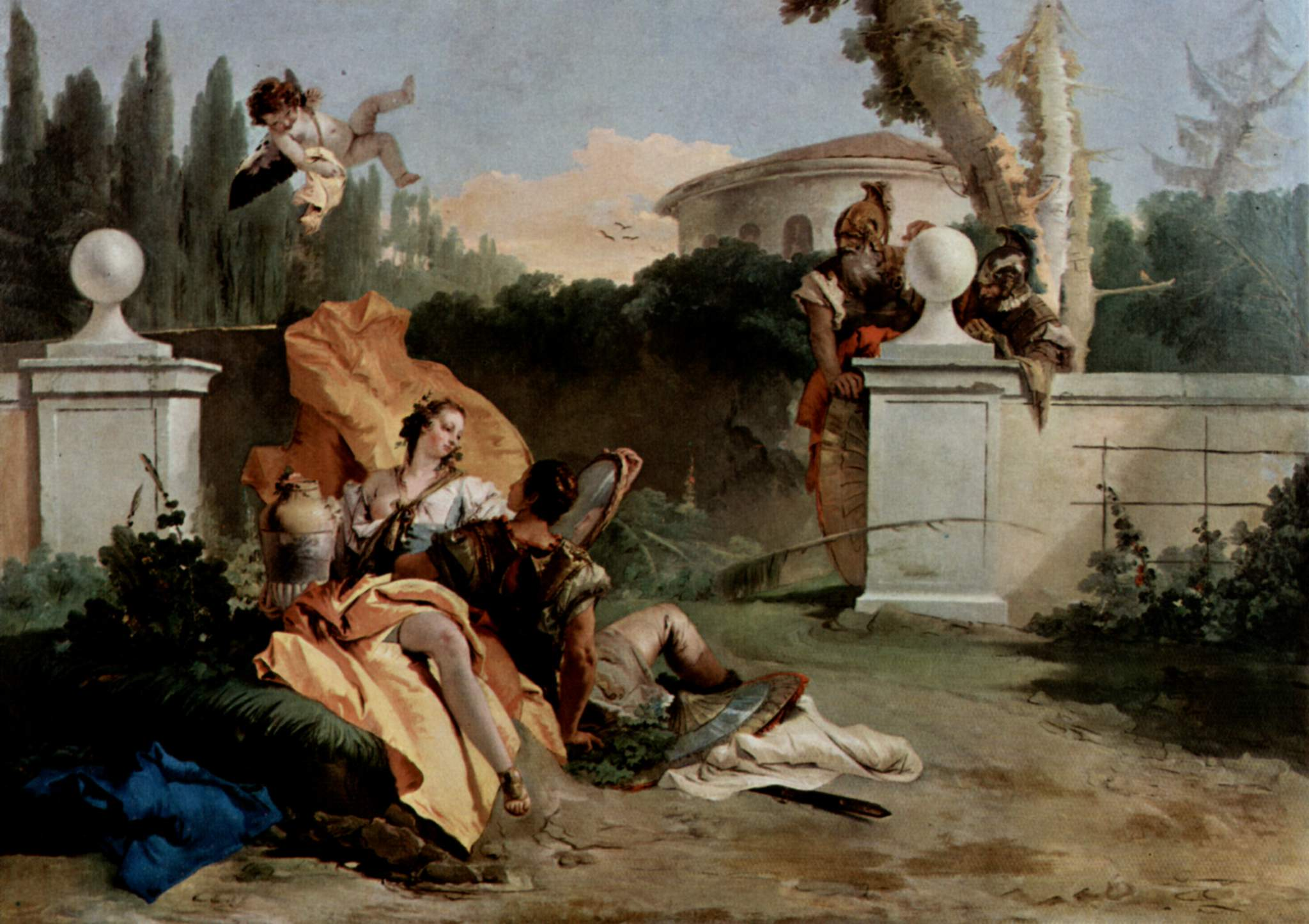
Rinaldo and Armida, by Tiepolo 1755.

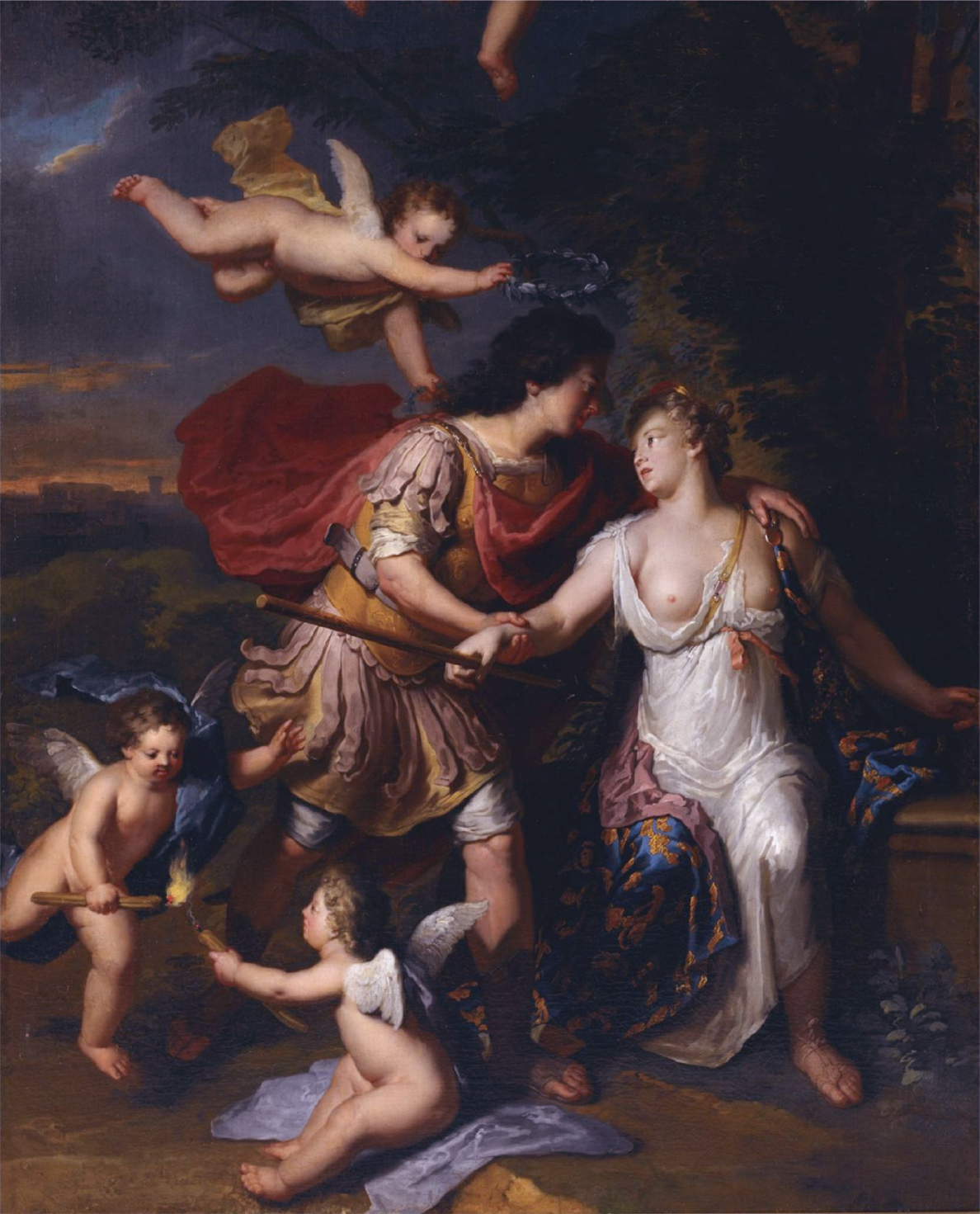
Rinaldo and Armida, by Gerard Hoet

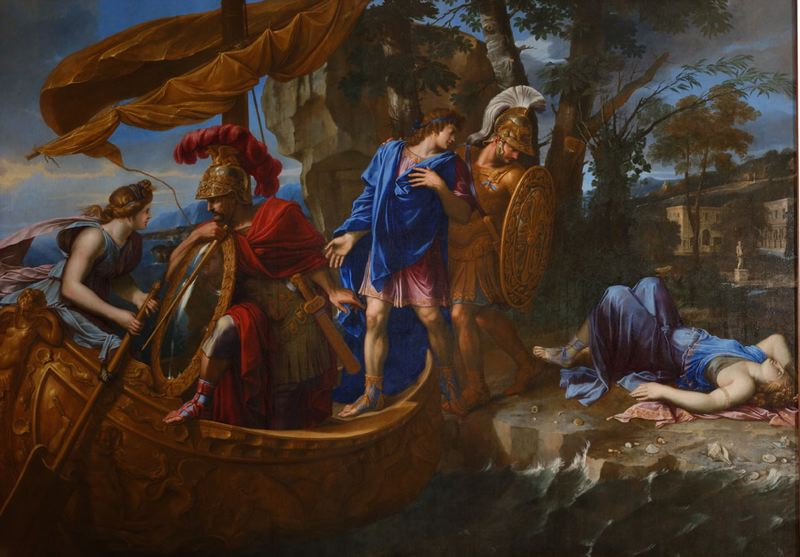
Charles Errard: Renaud abandonnant Armide, Rinaldo abandoning Armida

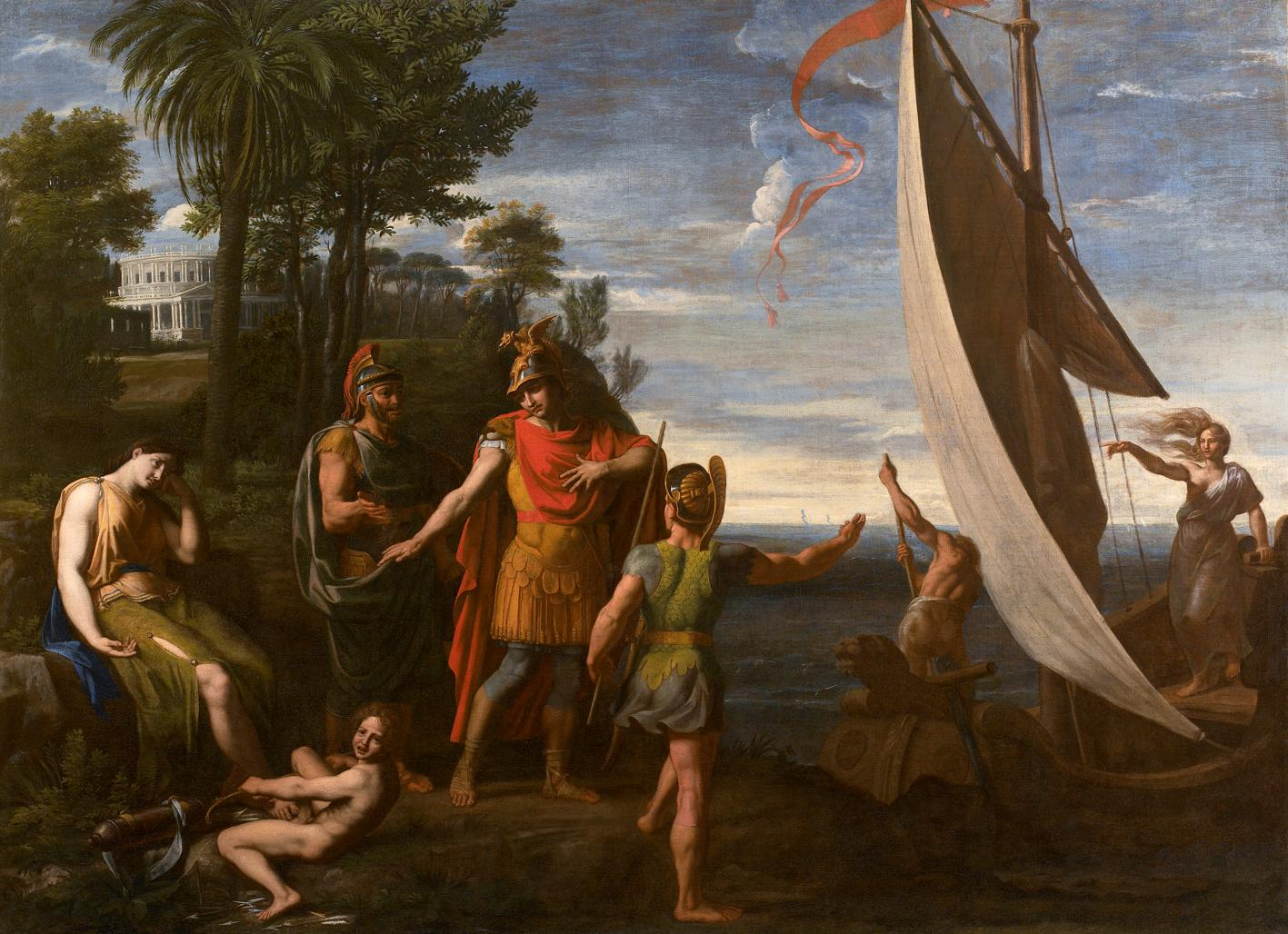
Nicolas Colombel - Rinaldo abandoning Armida

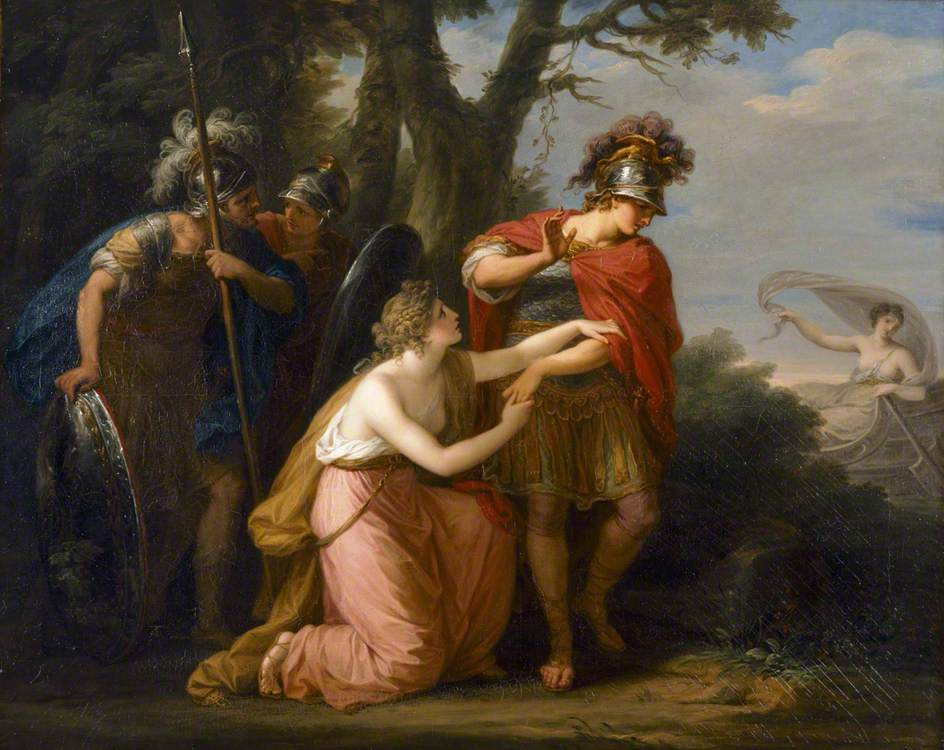
Armida in Vain Endeavours with Her Entreaties to Prevent Rinaldo's Departure by Angelica Kauffman, 1813

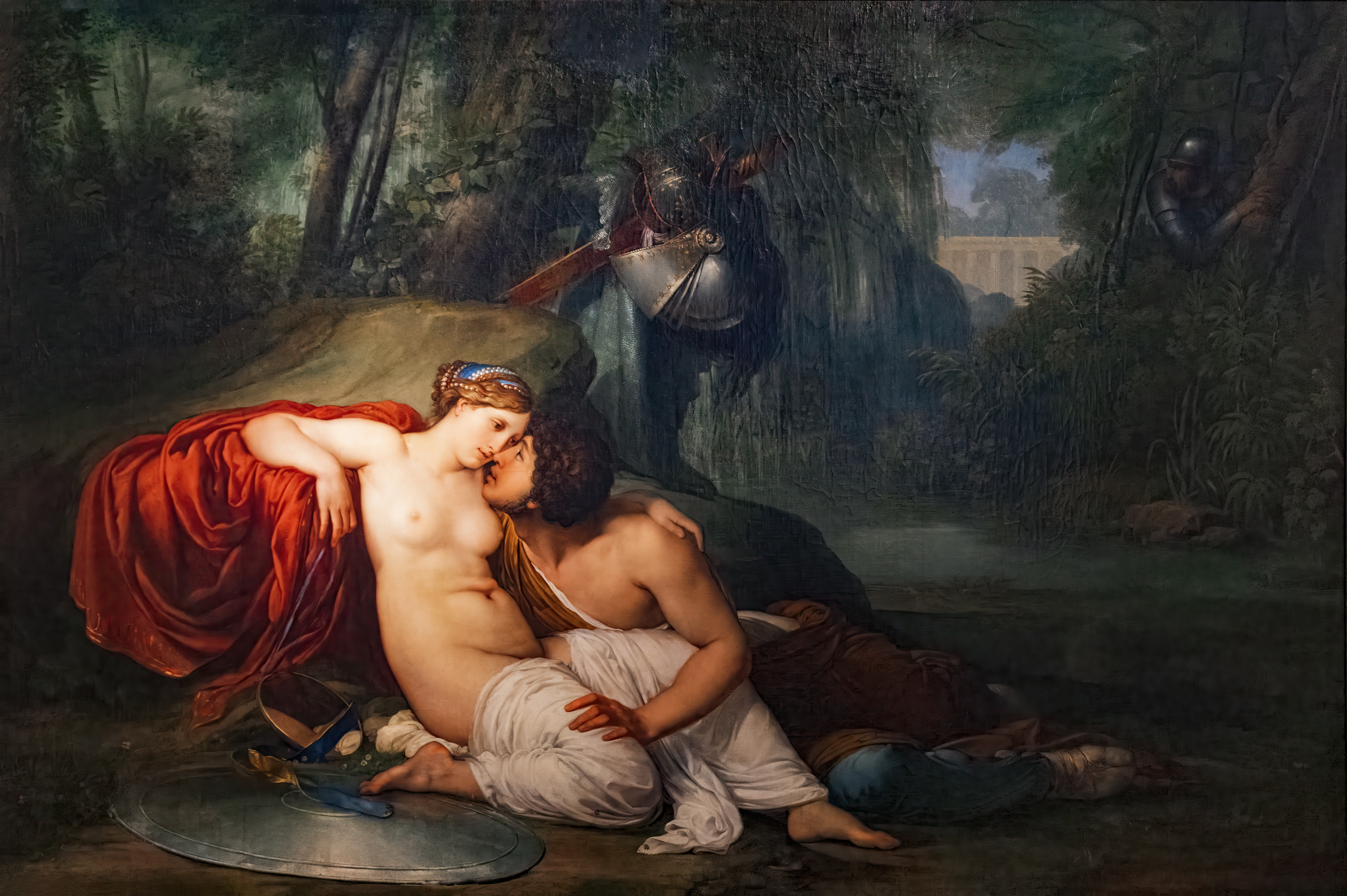
Rinaldo and Armida by Francesco Hayez, 1813
