= Jerusalem Delivered =

Epic poem by Torquato Tasso

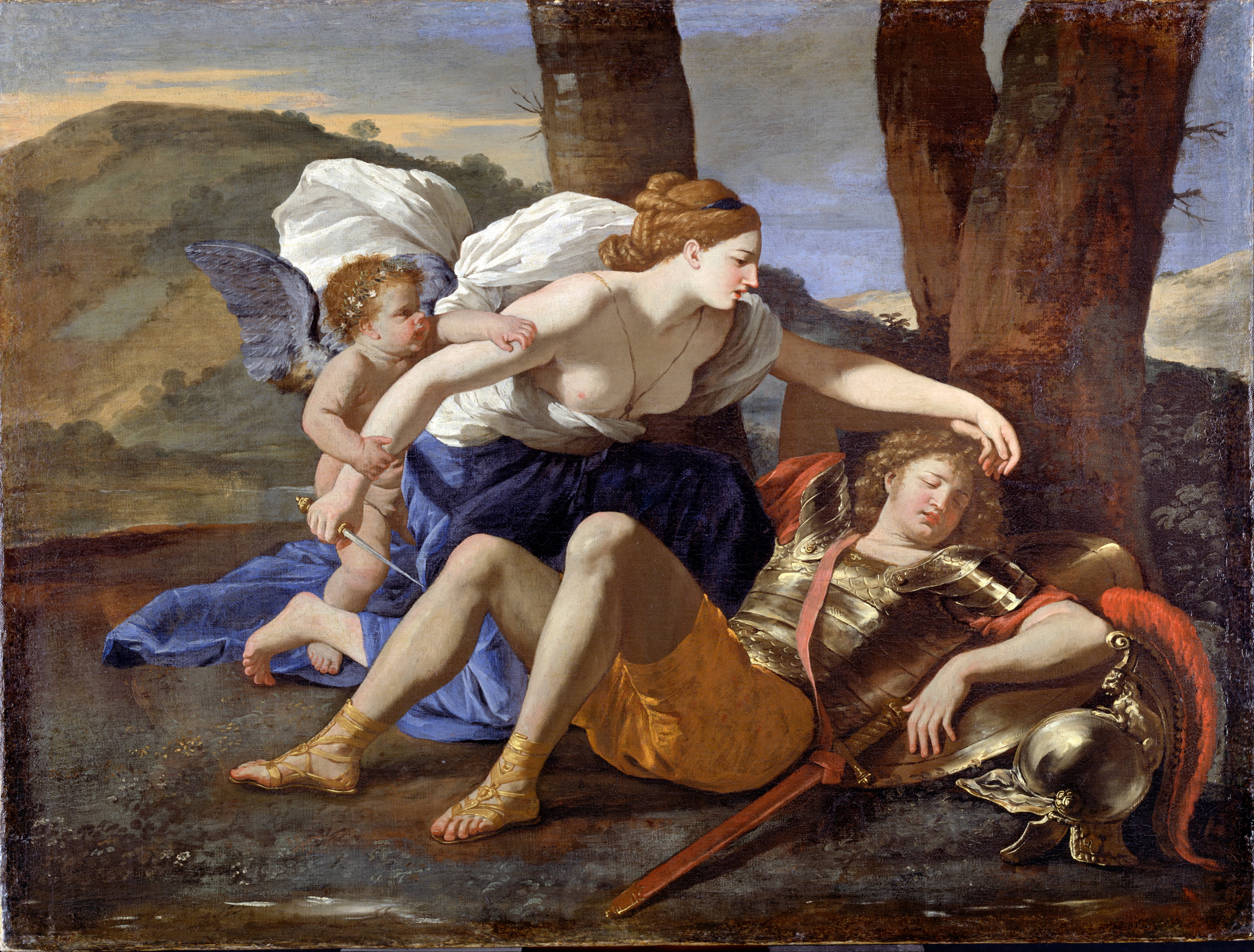
Armida Discovers the Sleeping Rinaldo by Nicolas Poussin (1629). Cupid restrains her from stabbing her enemy.

Jerusalem Delivered, also known as The Liberation of Jerusalem (Italian: La Gerusalemme liberata [la dʒeruzaˈlɛmme libeˈraːta]; lit. 'The freed Jerusalem'), is an epic poem by the Italian poet Torquato Tasso, first published in 1581, that tells a largely mythified version of the First Crusade in which Christian knights, led by Godfrey of Bouillon, battle Muslims in order to take Jerusalem. Tasso began work on the poem in the mid-1560s. Originally, it bore the title Il Goffredo. It was completed in April 1575 and that summer the poet read his work to Duke Alfonso of Ferrara and Lucrezia, Duchess of Urbino. A pirate edition of 14 cantos from the poem appeared in Venice in 1580. The first complete editions of Gerusalemme liberata were published in Parma and Ferrara in 1581.

Tasso's choice of subject matter, an actual historic conflict between Christians and Muslims (albeit with fantastical elements added), had a historical grounding and created compositional implications (the narrative subject matter had a fixed endpoint and could not be endlessly spun out in multiple volumes) that are lacking in other Renaissance epics. Like other works of the period that portray conflicts between Christians and Muslims, this subject matter had a topical resonance to readers of the period when the Ottoman Empire was advancing through Eastern Europe.

The poem was hugely successful, and sections or moments from the story were used in works in other media all over Europe, especially in the period before the French Revolution and the Romantic movement, which provided alternative stories combining love, violence, and an exotic setting.

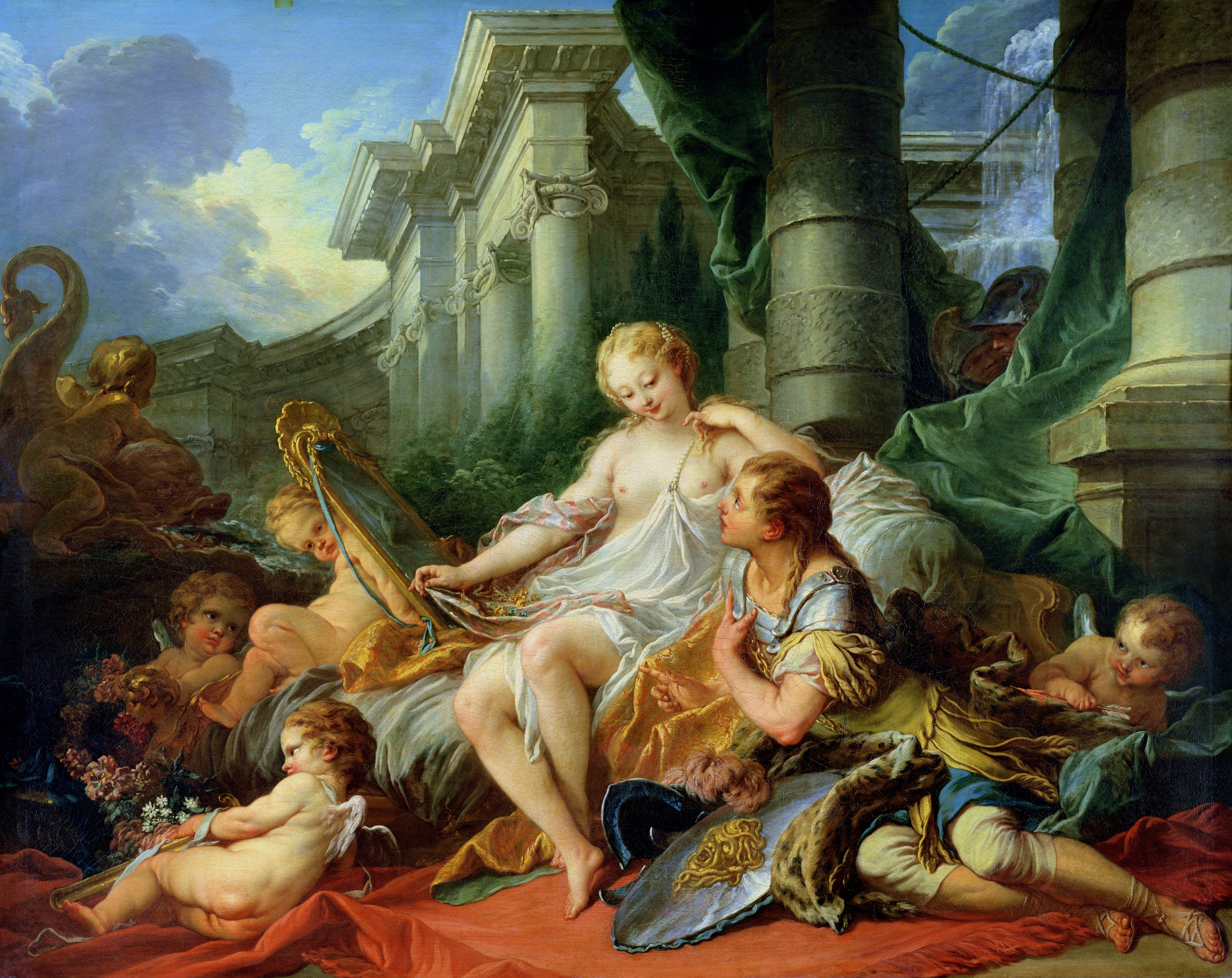
Rinaldo and Armida in her garden, by François Boucher

The poem is composed of 1,917 stanzas in ottava rima (15,336 hendecasyllabic lines), grouped into twenty cantos of varying length. The work belongs to the Italian Renaissance tradition of the romantic epic poem, and Tasso frequently borrows plot elements and character types directly from Ariosto's Orlando Furioso. Tasso's poem also has elements inspired by the classical epics of Homer and Virgil (especially in those sections of their works that tell of sieges and warfare). One of the most characteristic literary devices in Tasso's poem is the emotional conundrum endured by characters torn between their heart and their duty; the depiction of love at odds with martial valour or honor is a central source of lyrical passion in the poem.

== Plot summary ==
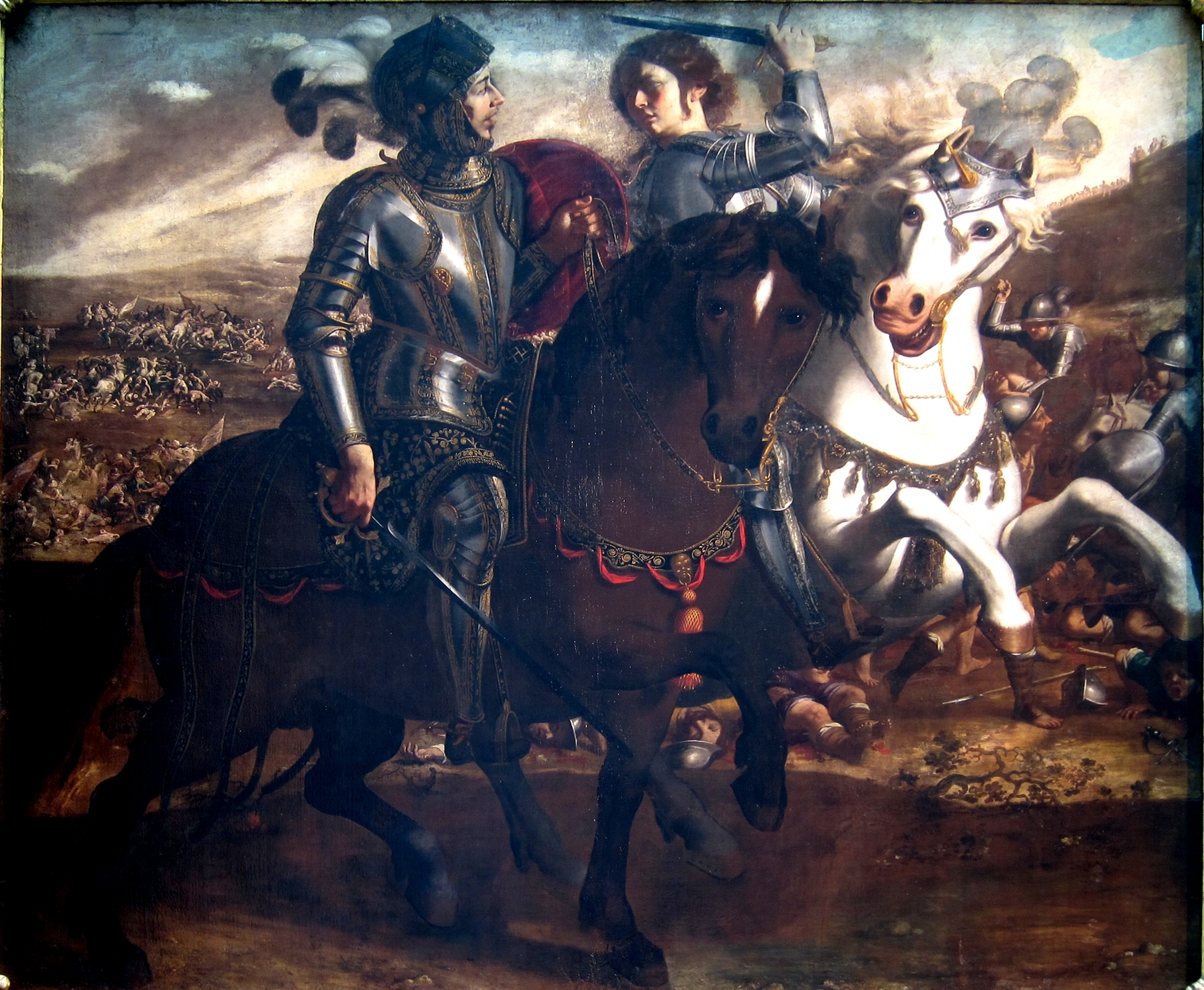
Clorinda attacks Tancredi, one of a series by Paolo Domenico Finoglia

The poem, which in detail bears almost no resemblance to the actual history or cultural setting of the Crusades (in fact, at the start of the poem it is said that the crusaders took Constantinople and killed Alexios I Komnenos and conquered the Sultanate of Rum), tells of the initial disunity and setbacks of the Christians and their ultimate success in taking Jerusalem in 1099. The main historical leaders of the First Crusade feature, but much of the poem is concerned with romantic sub-plots involving entirely fictional characters, except for Tancredi, who is identified with the historical Tancred, Prince of Galilee. The three main female characters begin as Muslims, have romantic entanglements with Christian knights, and are eventually converted to Christianity. They are all women of action: two of them fight in battles, and the third is a sorceress. There are many magical elements, and the Saracens often act as though they were classical pagans. The most famous episodes, and those most often dramatised and painted, include the following:

Sofronia (in English: Sophronia), a Christian maiden of Jerusalem, accuses herself of a crime in order to avert a general massacre of the Christians by the Muslim king. In an attempt to save her, her lover Olindo accuses himself in turn, and each lover pleads with the authorities in order to save the other. However, it is the arrival and intervention of the warrior-maiden Clorinda which saves them (Canto 2).

Clorinda joins the Muslims, but the Christian knight Tancredi (in English: Tancred) falls in love with her (Canto 3). During a night battle in which she sets the Christian siege tower on fire, she is mistakenly killed by Tancredi, but she converts to Christianity before dying (Canto 12). The character of Clorinda is inspired in part by Virgil's Camilla and by Bradamante in Ariosto; the circumstances of her birth (a Caucasian girl born to African parents) are modeled on the lead character (Chariclea) from Aethiopica, the ancient Greek novel by Heliodorus of Emesa. To prevent the crusaders from cutting timber for siege engines, the Muslim sorcerer Ismen protects the forest with enchantments, which defeat the Christian knights, even Tancredi (Canto 13). Eventually, the enchantments are broken by Rinaldo, and the siege engines built (Canto 18).

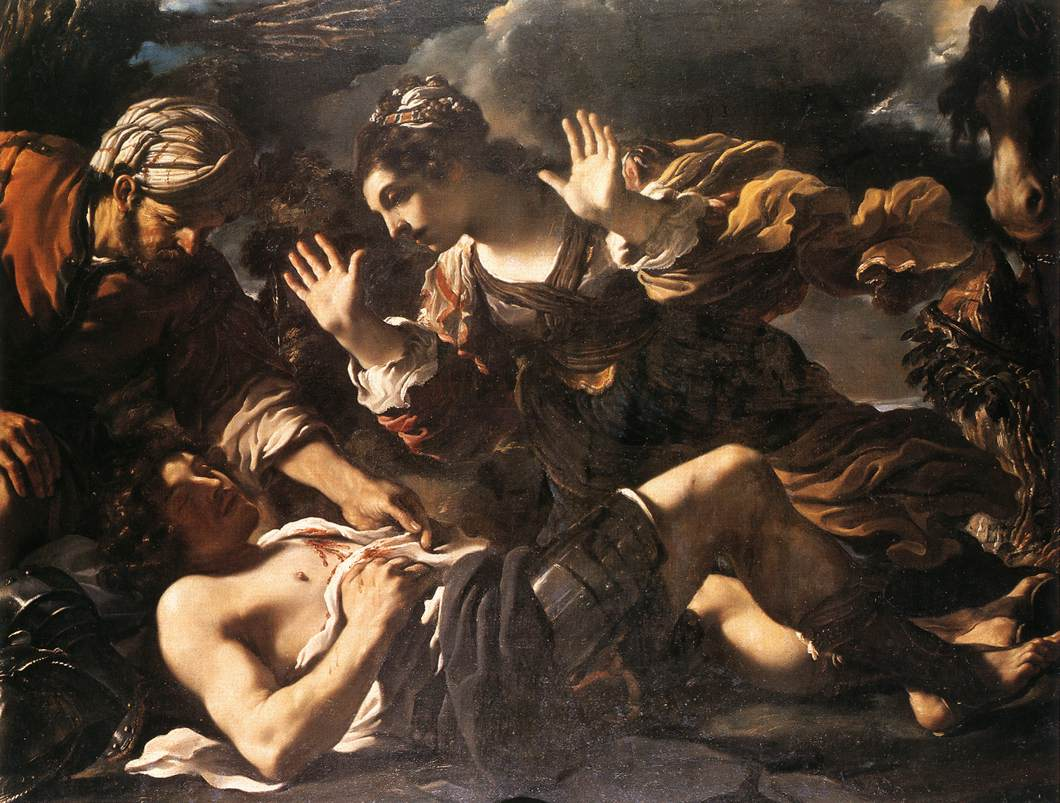
Erminia discovers the wounded Tancred, by Guercino (1619).

Another maiden of the region, the Princess Erminia (or "Hermine") of Antioch, also falls in love with Tancredi and betrays her people to help him, but she grows jealous when she learns that Tancredi loves Clorinda. One night she steals Clorinda's armor and leaves the city, in an attempt to find Tancredi, but she is attacked by Christian soldiers (who mistake her for Clorinda) and she flees into the forest, where she is cared for by a family of shepherds, with an old man who weaves baskets (Cantos 6–7). Later in the poem, we find her again in the company of Armida's ladies, but Erminia abandons her Muslim people and goes over to the Christian side. When Tancredi is dangerously wounded in combat, she heals him, cutting off her hair to bind his wounds (Canto 19).

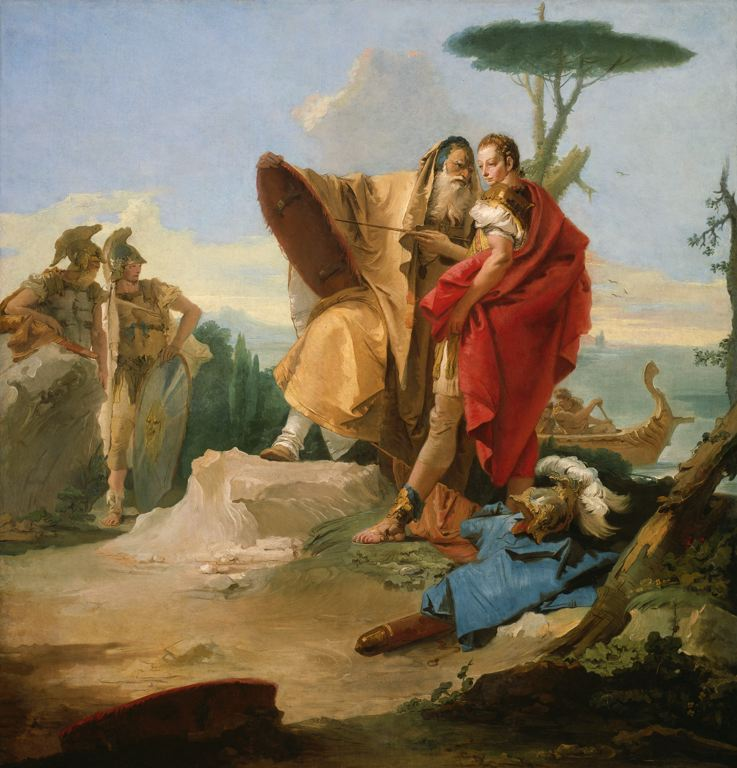
Rinaldo and the wizard of Ascalon, Giovanni Battista Tiepolo

The witch Armida (modeled on Circe in Homer and the witch Alcina in Ariosto's epic) enters the Christian camp asking for their aid; her seductions divide the knights against each other and a group leaves with her, only to be transformed into animals by her magic (Canto 5). Armida comes across the sleeping Rinaldo, the greatest of the Christian knights, and abducts him in her chariot (Canto 14). He has the same name as a Carolingian paladin count who is a character in Ariosto's Orlando Furioso [III, 30]; he is the son of Bertoldo and was the reputed founder of the House of Este. She intends to kill him but she falls in love with him instead and takes him away to a magical island where he becomes infatuated with her and forgets the crusade.

Carlo and Ubaldo, two Christian knights and close companions of Rinaldo, seek out the hidden fortress, brave the dangers that guard it and find Rinaldo and Armida in each other's arms. By giving Rinaldo a mirror of diamond, they force him to see himself in his effeminate and amorous state and to return to the war, leaving Armida heartbroken (Cantos 14–16). Rinaldo is deposited on a shore where he finds a shield and sword, and the "Mago d'Ascalona" ("Wizard of Ascalon") shows him a vision of the future in the shield, including the glories of the House of Este (Tasso drops in several prophecies of the time between 1099 and his own at various points). Rinaldo resolves to pursue the crusade with all his might (Canto 17).

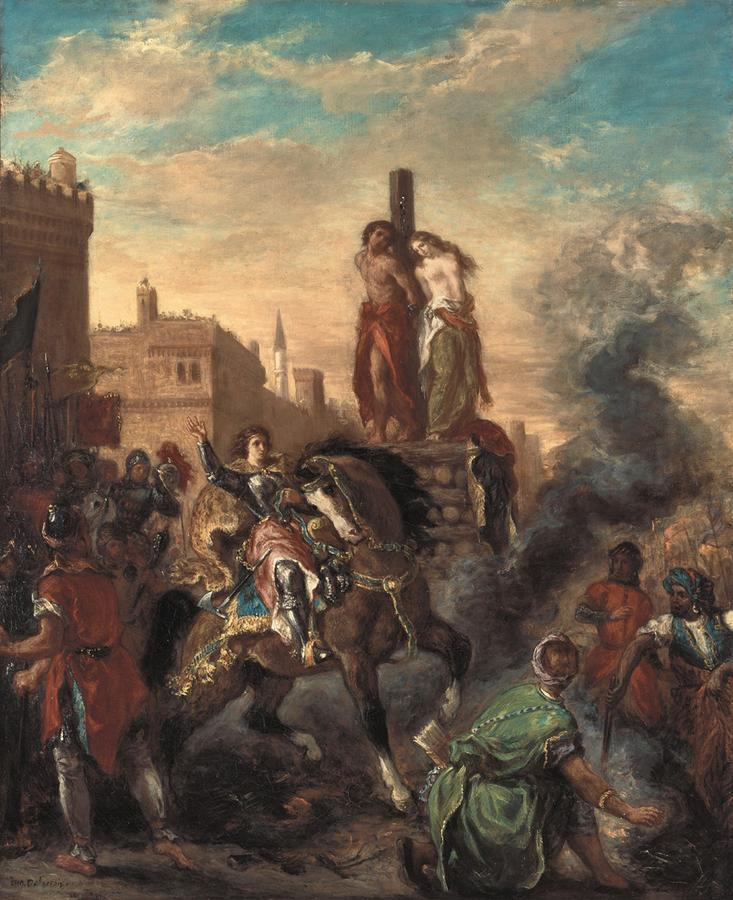
Clorinda Rescues Olindo and Sophronia by Eugène Delacroix.

Armida is grief-stricken and raises an army to kill Rinaldo and fight the Christians, but her champions are all defeated. She attempts to commit suicide, but Rinaldo finds her in time and prevents her. Rinaldo then begs her to convert to Christianity, and Armida, her heart softened, consents (Canto 20). (This sequence echoes a similar storyline in Ariosto: the witch Alcina ensnares the knight Ruggiero, but the spell is broken by a magic ring that the good sorceress Melissa brings him; earlier antecedents include Calypso's attempt to keep Odysseus on her island Ogygia and Morgan le Fay taking Ogier the Dane off to a faraway island.)

After the enchantments on the forest are broken, finally the Crusaders breach the walls and take the city, with some Muslims remaining in the Temple Mount. But an Egyptian army is known to be arriving in a few days (Canto 18). When they arrive there is a great battle outside the walls, which the Christians win, completing their quest (Canto 20).

== Reception ==
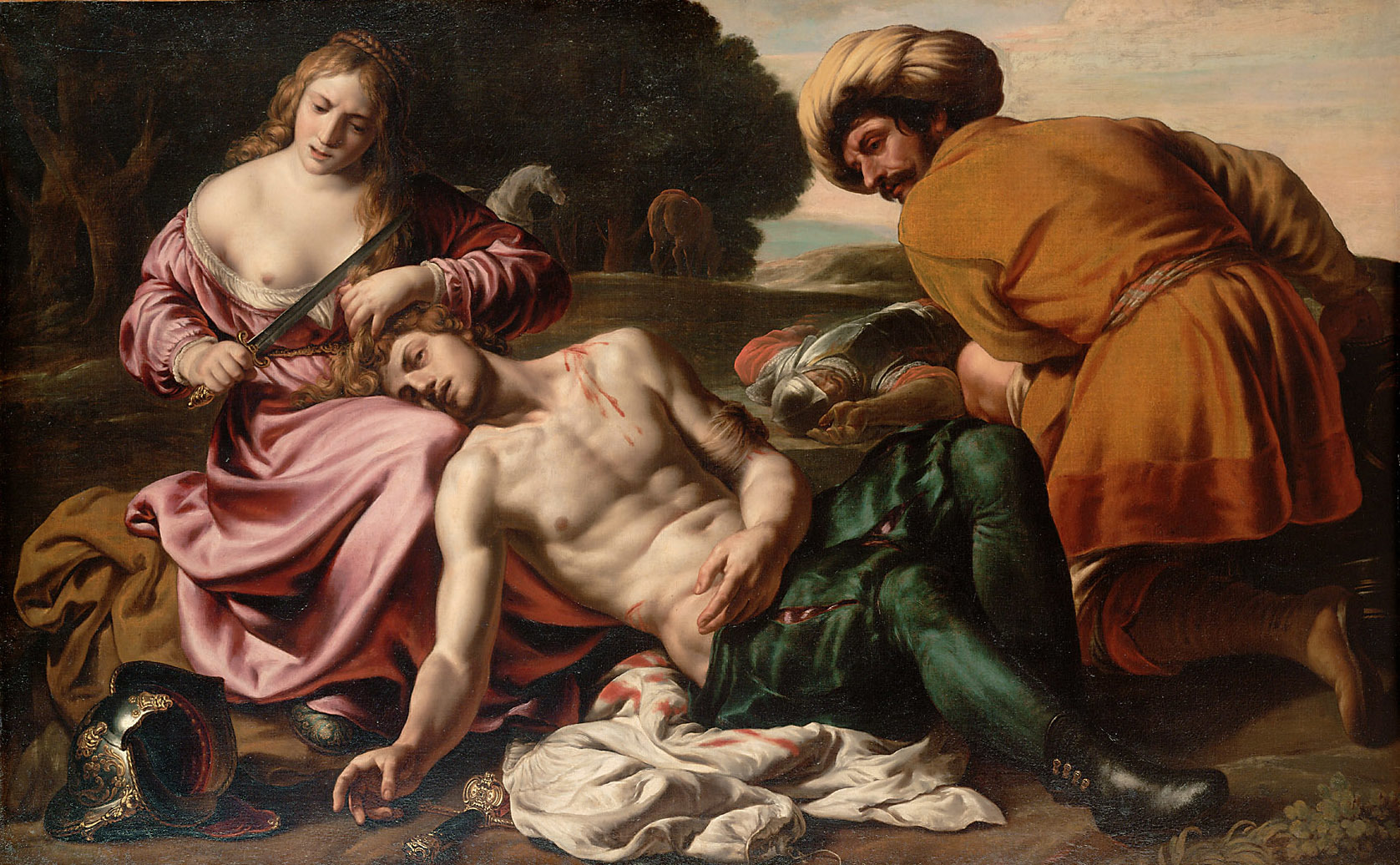
Erminia tends to Tancredi's wounds by Alessandro Turchi, c. 1630

The poem was immensely successful throughout Europe and over the next two centuries various sections were frequently adapted as individual storylines for madrigals, operas, plays, ballets and masquerades. Upon publication, two thousand copies of the book were sold in a day.

Certain critics of the period however were less enthusiastic, and Tasso came under much criticism for the magical extravagance and narrative confusion of his poem. Before his death, he rewrote the poem virtually from scratch, under a new title (La Gerusalemme Conquistata, or "Jerusalem Conquered"). This revised version, however, has found little favor with either audiences or critics.

== In art ==
Scenes from the poem were often depicted in art, mainly by Italian or French artists in the Baroque period, which began shortly after the poem was published. Most paintings showed the love stories, typically with lovers as the two main figures. Common scenes depicted include several with Rinaldo, some including Armida. These include: Armida sees the sleeping Rinaldo, and draws her sword to kill him, but Cupid restrains her hand; instead she abducts him in her chariot; Carlo and Ubaldo in Armida's garden; the knights find the lovers gazing at each other; Rinaldo abandons her. Also popular were Tancredi baptising the mortally wounded Clorinda and Erminia finding the wounded Tancredi, a moment of high emotion in the poem and perhaps the most often depicted. She is also shown nursing him, cutting off her hair to use as bandages.

Most depictions until the 19th century use vaguely classical costume (at least for the men) and settings; by then Lord Byron, Sir Walter Scott and other romantic writers had begun to replace Tasso as sources of exotic love stories to adapt into other media. Some use more contemporary armour, but attempts at authentic 11th-century decor are not seen. The scenes almost all take place outdoors, in an idealized pastoral landscape, which can occupy much of the composition, as in the 18th-century fresco cycles.

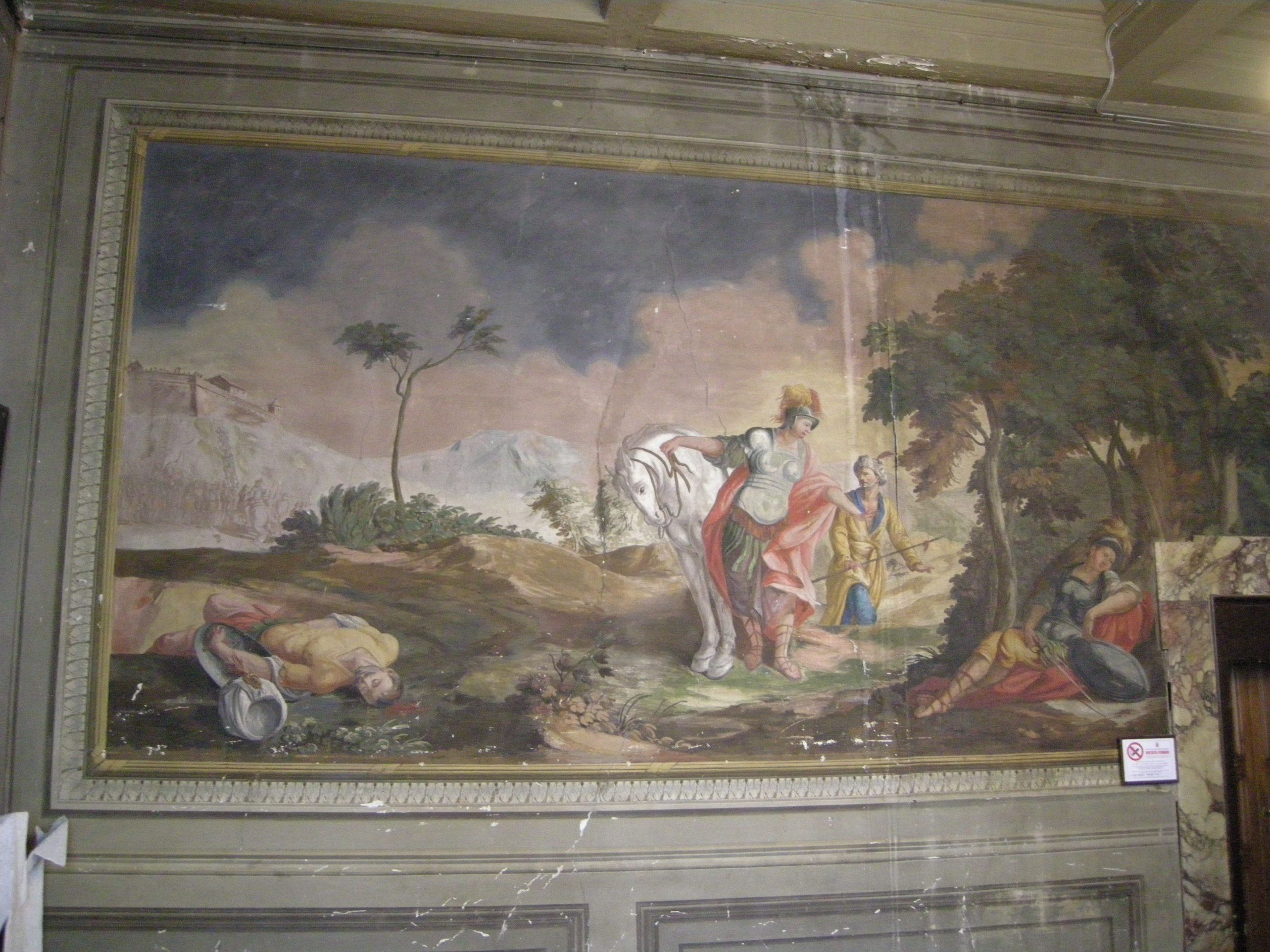
Part of the Palazzo Panciatichi scheme, in fresco

Simon Vouet painted a Suite of the Loves of Rinaldo and Armida (1631), based on Jerusalem Delivered, now in the collection of Guyot de Villeneuve, Paris. Twelve tapestries after Vouet, based on scenes from the poem, are at the Louvre.

Series of works in paint or tapestry decorated some palaces. A set of ten large canvases by Paolo Domenico Finoglia were painted from 1634 on for the Palazzo Acquaviva in Conversano in Apulia, home of the local ruler, where they remain. Scenes from the poem were also depicted in fresco cycles at the Palace of Fontainebleau, by the second School of Fontainebleau in France, by Giovanni Battista Tiepolo in the Villa Valmarana (Lisiera) in the Veneto (c. 1757), and in the bedroom of King Ludwig II of Bavaria at Schloss Hohenschwangau.

Another set of four oil paintings by Tiepolo were painted c. 1742–45 as part of a decorative scheme, including a ceiling and other panels, for a room in a Venetian palace of the Cornaro family, but are now in the Art Institute of Chicago. They show the story of Rinaldo, with three covering his time with Armida. As in many paintings, Rinaldo's companions Carlo and Ubaldo are also shown. Among 18th-century rooms with sets of paintings of the poem that survive intact are two in Florence, at the Palazzo Temple Leader and Palazzo Panciatichi.

The first illustrated edition was in 1590, in Italian, and others followed. A set of 35 etchings by Antonio Tempesta better reflect the actual balance of the poem, also showing the military parts of the story.

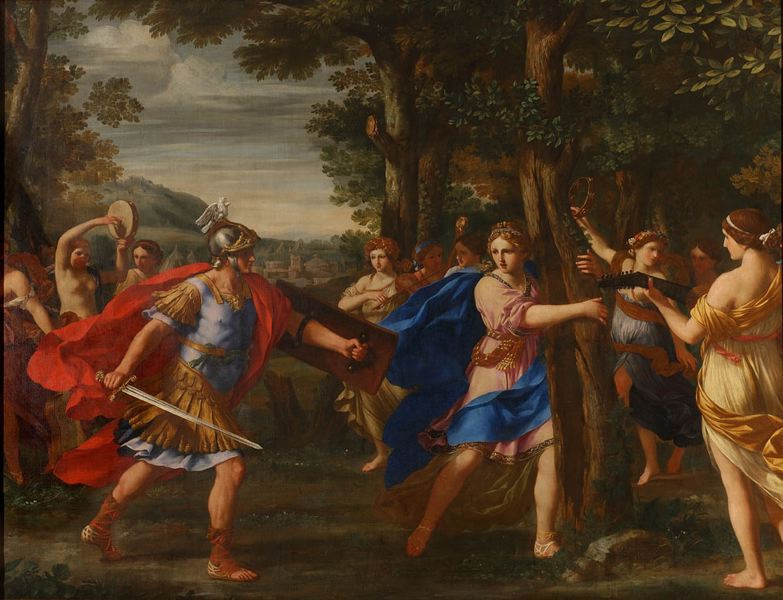
Rinaldo and Armida meet in the enchanted forest by Giacinto Gimignani

The series of ten large paintings by Finoglio has the following scenes, which may be taken as typical:

- The Torture of Olindo and Sofronia
- The encounter of Clorinda and Tancredi
- The duel between Raimondo di Tolosa and Argante
- Baptism and death of Clorinda
- Rinaldo and Armida in the enchanted forest
- Carlo and Ubaldo urge Rinaldo to fulfill his duty
- Armida tries to restrain Rinaldo
- Rinaldo abandons the enchanted Island
- Erminia discovers the wounded Tancredi
- Rinaldo, victorious, puts the enemy into flight

== Influence in English literature ==
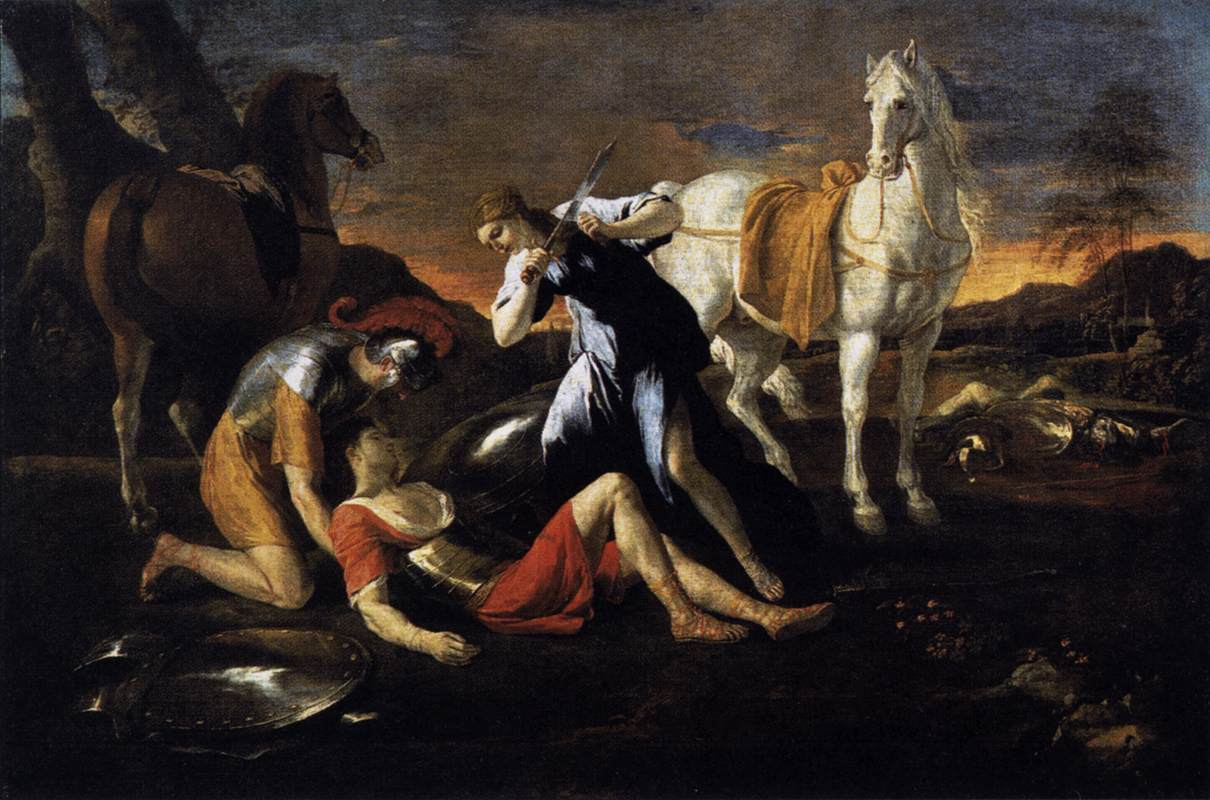
Tancred and Erminia by Nicolas Poussin, 1630s

The fame of Tasso's poem quickly spread throughout the European continent. In England, Sidney, Daniel and Drayton seem to have admired it, and, most importantly, Edmund Spenser described Tasso as an "excellente poete" and made use of elements from Gerusalemme liberata in The Faerie Queene. The description of Redcrosse's vision of the Heavenly Jerusalem in the First Book owes something to Rinaldo's morning vision in Canto 18 of Gerusalemme. In the twelfth canto of Book Two, Spenser's enchantress Acrasia is partly modelled on Tasso's Armida, and the English poet directly imitated two stanzas from the Italian. The portrayal of Satan and the demons in the first two books of Milton's Paradise Lost is also indebted to Tasso's poem.

The first attempt to translate Gerusalemme liberata into English was made by Richard Carew, who published his version of the first five cantos as Godfrey of Bulloigne or the recoverie of Hierusalem in 1594. More significant was the complete rendering by Edward Fairfax which appeared in 1600 and has been acclaimed as one of the finest English verse translations. (There is also an eighteenth-century translation by John Hoole, and there are modern versions by Anthony Esolen and Max Wickert.) Tasso's poem remained popular among educated English readers and was, at least until the end of the 19th century, considered one of the supreme achievements of Western literature. Somewhat eclipsed in the Modernist period, its fame is showing signs of recovering.

It seems to have remained in the curriculum, formal or informal, for girls, in times when it was not taught at boys' schools. The English critic George Saintsbury (1845–1933) recorded that "Every girl from Scott's heroines to my own sisters seem to have been taught Dante and Petrarch and Tasso and even Ariosto, as a matter of course."

== Works based on ==
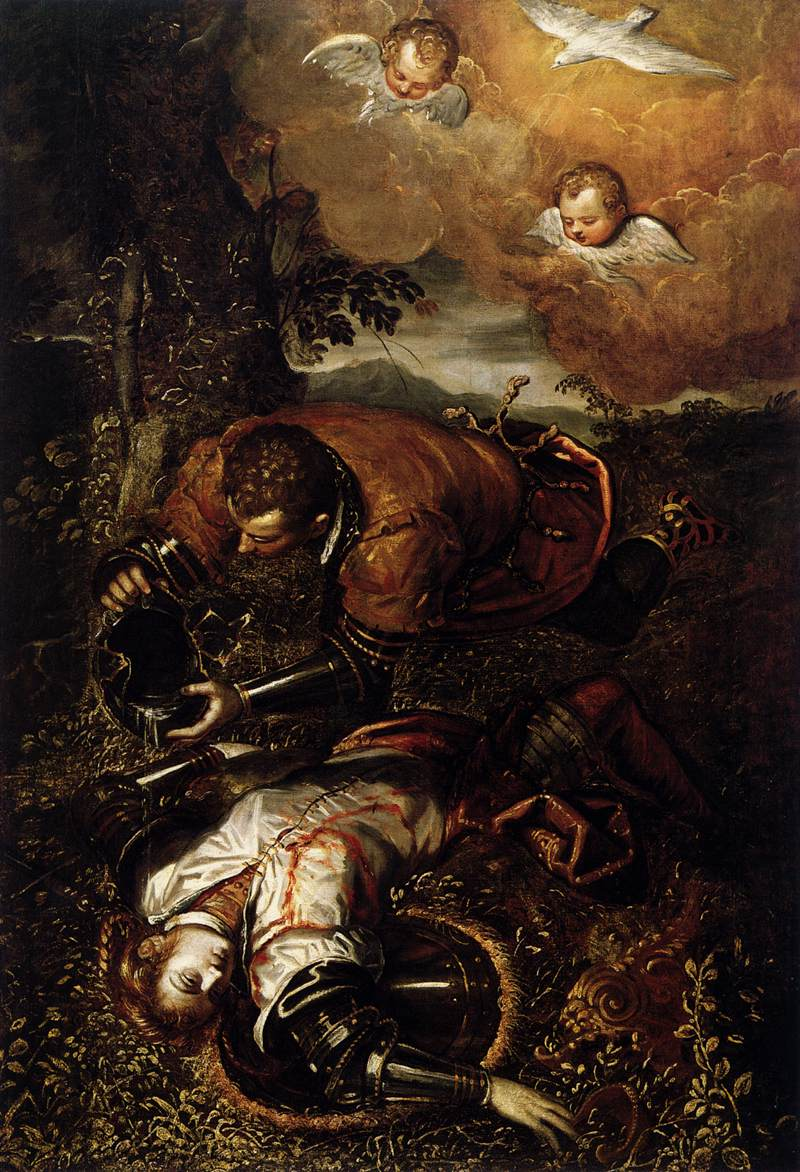
Tancredi Baptizing Clorinda by Domenico Tintoretto, c. 1585

=== Music and operas ===
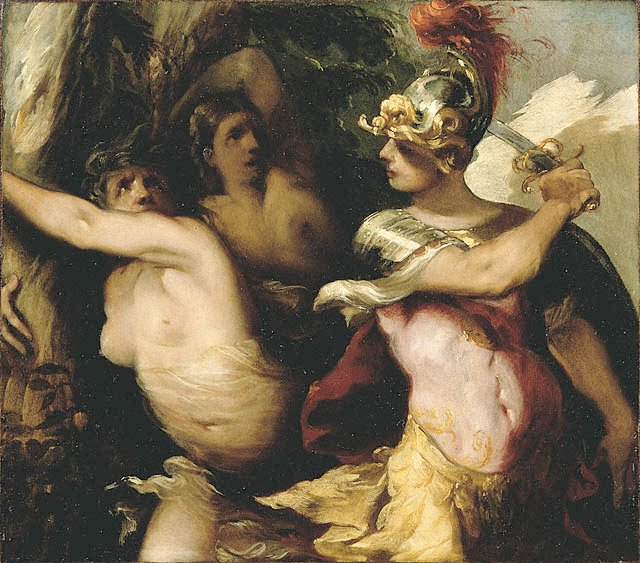
Rinaldo about to destroy the tree that controls the enchanted forest by Francesco Maffei, c. 1650–55

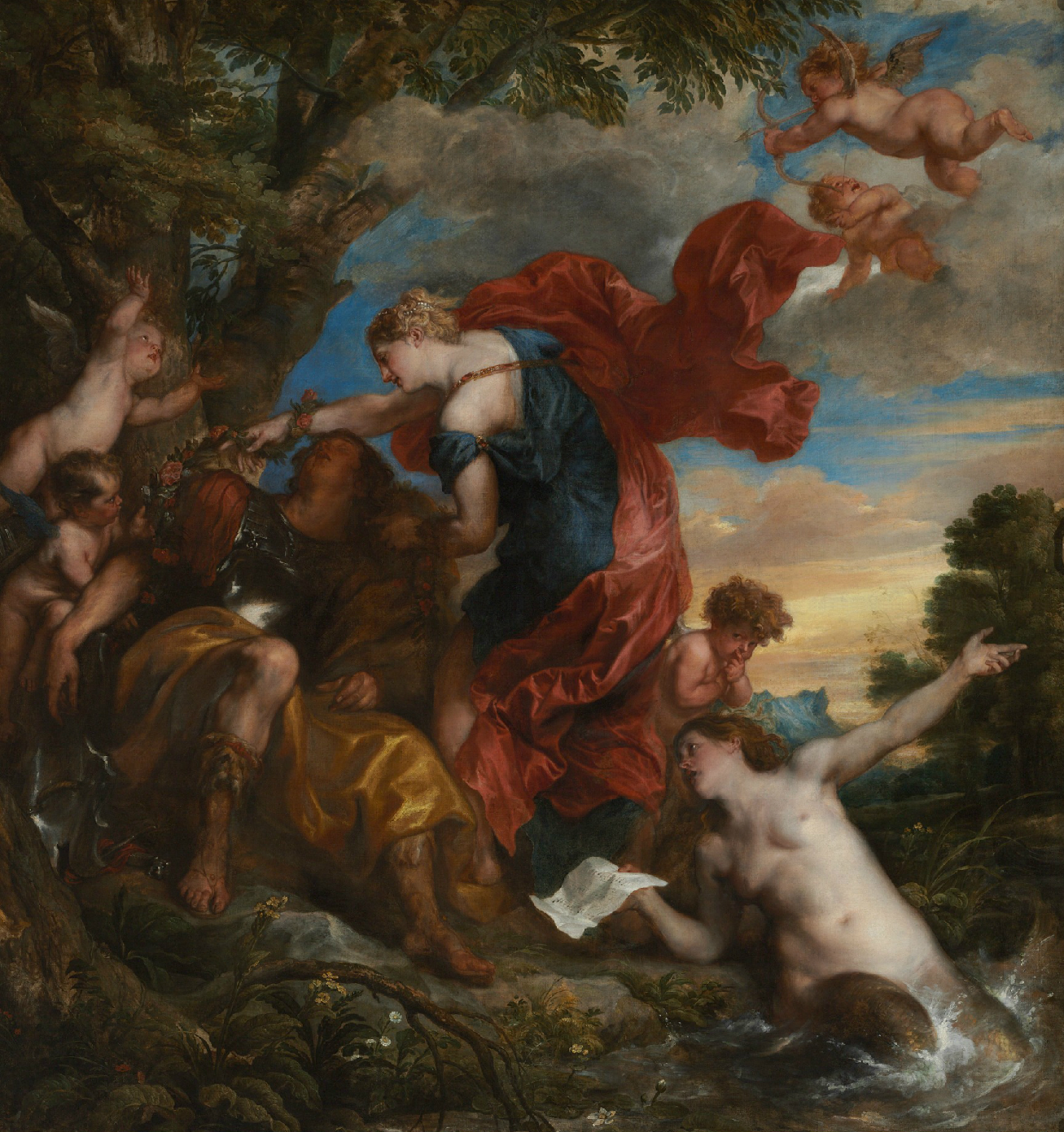
Armida discovers the sleeping Rinaldo by Anthony van Dyck

- Madrigals La Gerusalemme Liberata by Giaches de Wert (c. 1595)
- Ballet de la Delivrance de Renaud by Pierre Guedron (Paris, 1617)
- Le lagrime d'Erminia song-cycle by Biagio Marini (Parma, after 1620)
- Il combattimento di Tancredi e Clorinda by Claudio Monteverdi (1624) from his eighth book of madrigals
- Armida abbandonata by Claudio Monteverdi (Venice, 1626) - only the libretto survives
- Il Tancredi by Girolamo Giacobbi (Bologna, before 1629)
- Erminia sul Giordano by Michelangelo Rossi (Rome, 1633)
- Armida by Benedetto Ferrari (Venice, 1639) music lost
- Armida by Marco Marazzoli (Ferrara, 1641)
- Armide by Jean-Baptiste Lully (Paris, 1686)
- La Gerusalemme liberata by Carlo Pallavicino (Venice, 1687)
- Gli avvenimenti di Erminia e di Clorinda by Carlo Francesco Pollarolo (Venice, 1693) music lost
- Amori di Rinaldo con Armida by Teofilo Orgiani (Brescia, 1697) music lost
- Tancrède by André Campra (Paris, 1702)
- Suite d'Armide ou Jerusalem Delivree by Philippe II duke of Orleans (Fontainebleau, 1704)
- Armida abbandonata by Giovanni Maria Ruggieri (Venice, 1707)
- Armida abbandonata by George Frideric Handel (Rome, 1707)
- Armida al campo by Giuseppe Boniventi (Venice, 1708)
- Armida regina di Damasco by Teofilo Orgiani (Verona, 1711) music lost
- Rinaldo by George Frideric Handel (London, 1711)
- Armida in Damasco by Giacomo Rampini (Venice, 1711)
- Armida abbandonata by Giuseppe Maria Buini (Bologna, 1716)
- Armida al campo d'Egitto by Antonio Vivaldi (Venice, 1718)
- Armida delusa by Giuseppe Maria Buini (Venice, 1720)
- Renaud, ou la Suite d'Armide by Henry Desmarest (Paris, 1722)
- Das eroberte Jerusalem, oder Armida und Rinaldo by Georg Caspar Schurmann (Brunswick, 1722)
- Armida abbandonata by Antonio Bioni (Prague, 1725)
- Armida al campo by Antonio Bioni (Breslau/Wrocław, 1726)
- Il trionfo di Armida by Tomaso Albinoni (Venice, 1726)
- L'abbandono di Armida by Antonio Pollarolo (Venice, 1729)
- Armida by Ferdinando Bertoni (Venice, 1747)
- Armida placata by Luca Antonio Predieri (Vienna, 1750)
- La Armida aplacada by Giovanni Battista Mele (Madrid, 1750)
- Armida by Carl Heinrich Graun (Berlin, 1751)
- The Inchanted Forrest by Francesco Geminiani (London, 1754)
- Armida by Tommaso Traetta (Vienna, 1761)
- Armida abbandonata by Niccolò Jommelli (Naples, 1770)
- Armida by Antonio Salieri (Vienna, 1771)
- Armide by Christoph Willibald Gluck (Paris, 1777)
- Armida by Josef Mysliveček (Milan, 1780)
- Renaud by Antonio Sacchini (Paris, 1783)
- Armida by Joseph Haydn (1784)
- Armida e Rinaldo by Giuseppe Sarti (St Petersburg, 1786)
- Tancredi by Gioacchino Rossini (Venice/Ferrara, 1813), based on the play Tancrède by Voltaire (1760)
- Armida by Gioacchino Rossini (Naples, 1817)
- Torquato Tasso by Gaetano Donizetti (Rome, 1833)
- Rinaldo by Johannes Brahms (1863, 1868) cantata
- Armida by Antonín Dvořák (1904)
- Armida by Judith Weir (2005)
- Sophronia at the hearth by Oksana Yevsyukova (2023), opera

=== Plays ===
- Max Turiel. Clorinda Deleste, El Camino del Sol. Partially adapted from Gerusalemme Liberata. ISBN 84-934710-8-9. Ediciones La Sirena 2006.

=== Paintings ===
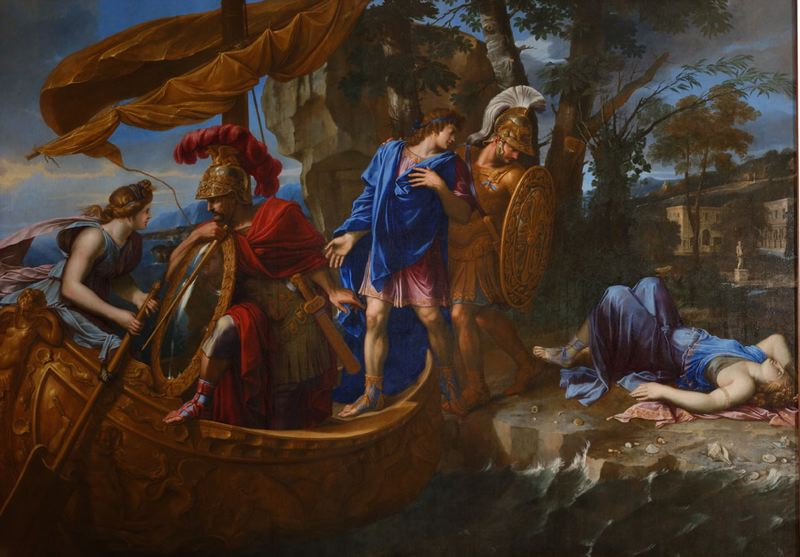
Rinaldo Abandons Armida by Charles Errard (c. 1640).

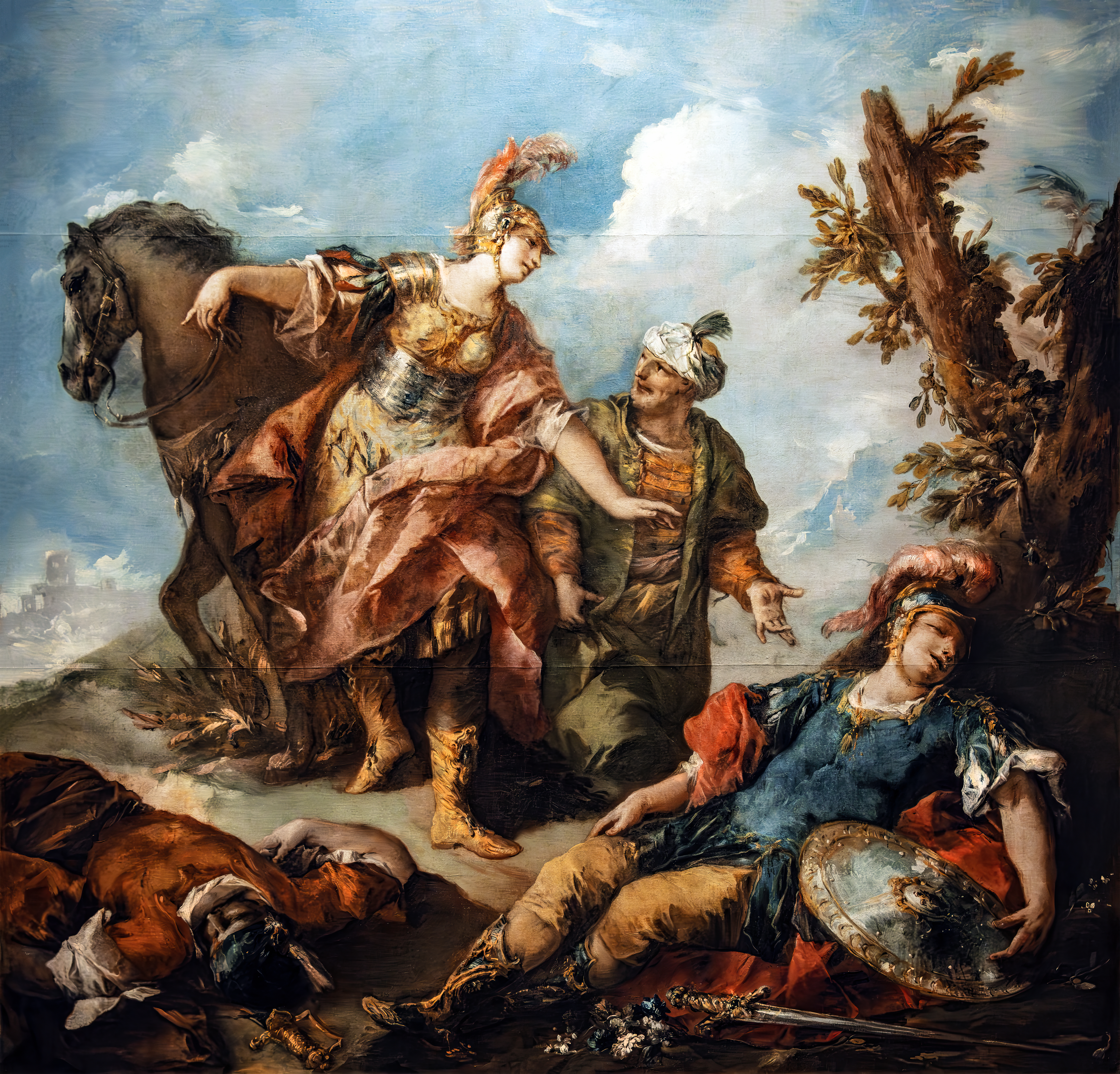
Herminia and Vaprino Find the Wounded Tancred by Giovanni Antonio Guardi (1750s).

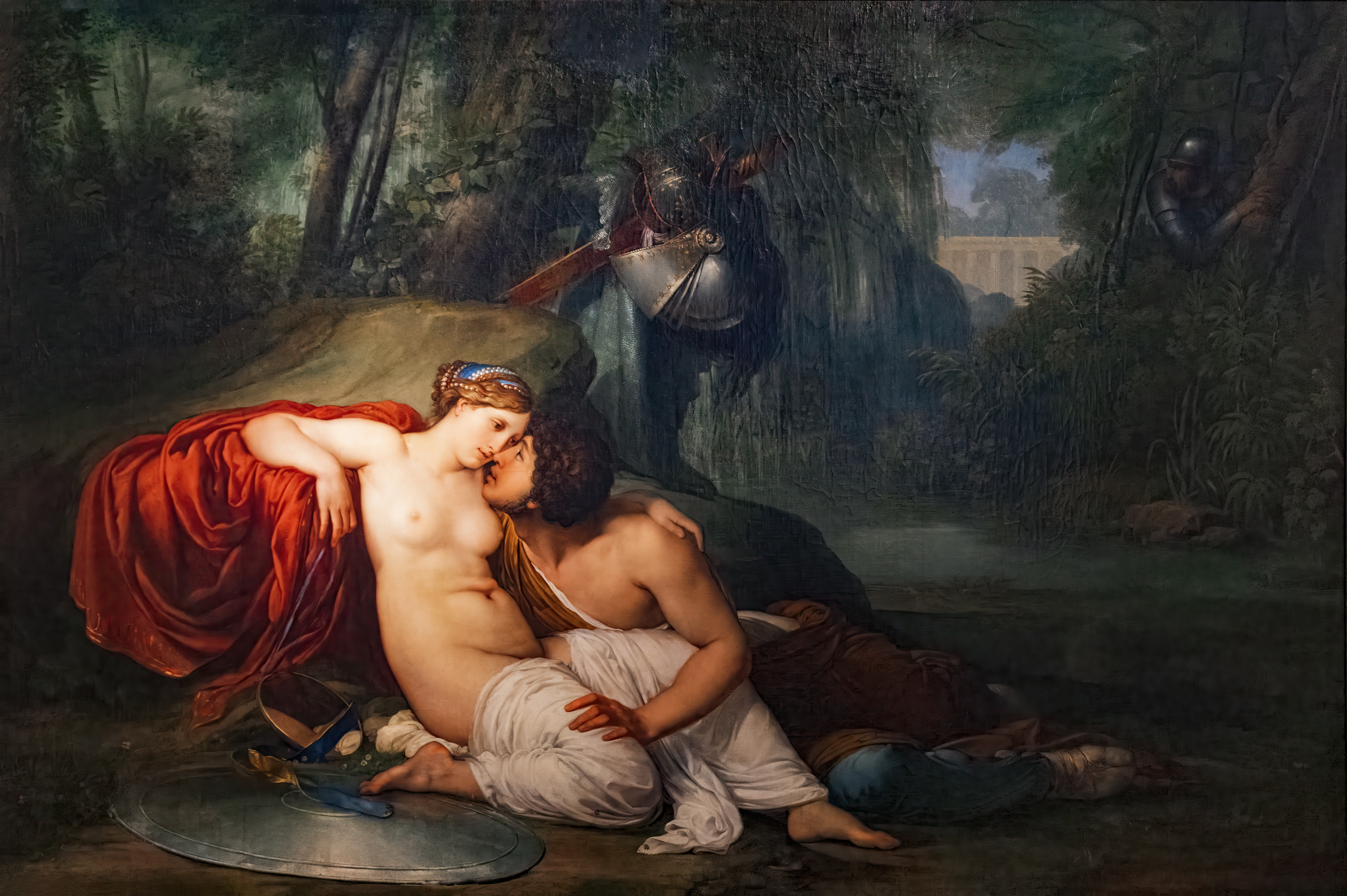
Rinaldo and Armida by Francesco Hayez, 1813

The numerous paintings inspired by the poem include:

- Lorenzo Lippi: Rinaldo in the enchanted forest (1647/1650), and other subjects, Kunsthistorisches Museum, Gemäldegalerie, Wien.
- Poussin's illustration to Jerusalem Delivered (1630s): "Tancred and Erminia" c.1630 in at least two versions, one in the Hermitage Museum in St Petersburg, another in the Barber Institute of Fine Arts, Birmingham.
- Theodor Hildebrandt – Tancred and Clorinda (ca. 1830)
- Robert Seymour – Jerusalem Delivered, with over 100 figures, exhibited at the Royal Academy, London 1822.
- Eugène Delacroix – Clorinda Rescues Olindo and Sophronia
- François Boucher – Rinaldo and Armida
- Angelica Kauffman – Armida in Vain Endeavours with Her Entreaties to Prevent Rinaldo's Departure (1776)
- Francesco Hayez – Rinaldo and Armida (1813)
- Paolo Finoglio – The pictorial series Jerusalem Delivered (1640)
- Giovanni Battista Tiepolo – Rinaldo Enchanted by Armida, 1742/45, Art Institute of Chicago, and many others
- Giovanni Battista Tiepolo Rinaldo leaves Armida, Villa Valmarana, province of Vicenza
- Domenico Tintoretto – Tancred Baptizing Clorinda, 1586–1600, Museum of Fine Arts, Houston

=== Fiction ===
- William Faulkner's short story "Carcassonne" uses imagery from the epic as its central thematic motif.

=== Film ===
- The Crusaders, a 1918 Italian film
- The Mighty Crusaders, a 1958 Italian film

== General sources ==
- Gerusalemme liberata ed. Lanfranco Caretti (Mondadori, 1983)
- Christiansen, Keith, ed., Giambattista Tiepolo, 1696–1770 (exhibition: Venice, Museum of Ca' Rezzonico, from September 5 to December 9, 1996; The Metropolitan Museum of Art, New York, January 24 to April 27, 1997, 1996, Metropolitan Museum of Art, ISBN 0870998129, 9780870998126, google books

== External links (translations etc.) ==
- Jerusalem Delivered, English translation (The Medieval and Classical Literature Library)
- Jerusalem Delivered, English translations at Google Books (pdf download)
- Plot summary, canto by canto, by Michael McGoodwin
- Jerusalem Delivered public domain audiobook at LibriVox
