= Ippolito Borghese =

Italian painter

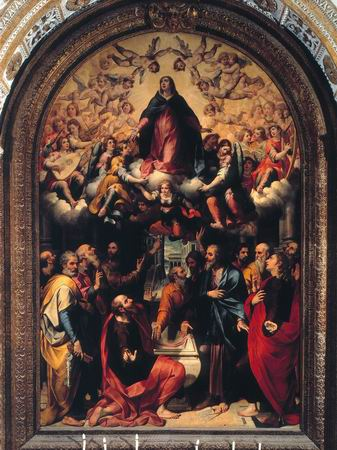
The Assumption of the Virgin. Painted in 1603 in Naples.

Ippolito Borghese (late 16th century – March 1627) was an Italian painter of the late-Renaissance, born in Sigillo (near Perugia).

== Early life ==
His training was probably in Rome, where he became a follower of Scipione Pulzone and was influenced by the painterly traditions of Federigo Barocci. He then moved to Naples. He was influenced by the circle of Mannerist artists active in the Rome of Sixtus V.

== Works ==
In 1598 he completed a St. George and the dragon for the Duomo of schia. In 1601 he signed a canvas in Carpignano Salentino. He painted a Madonna & saints (1601) for the church of Santa Maria della Grotta in Carpignano. In 1603, he painted an Assumption of the Virgin for the Chapel of the Palace of Monte di Pietà in Naples. One of his pupils was Paolo Domenico Finoglia. In 1605, he painted for the church of Santa Teresa in Studi.

He painted numerous altarpieces intended for Neapolitan churches such as Santa Maria La Nova, the Bishop's seminary, and Santi Filippo e Giacomo, as well as for churches in surrounding sites such as Lucera, Regoledo, Corigliano Calabro, Amalfi, Caiazzo, San Gregorio Armeno, Meta di Sorrento, and Atri. In 1627, he collaborated with Finoglia in a polyptych for the church of Sant'Antonio in Lauria.
