= Armida abbandonata =

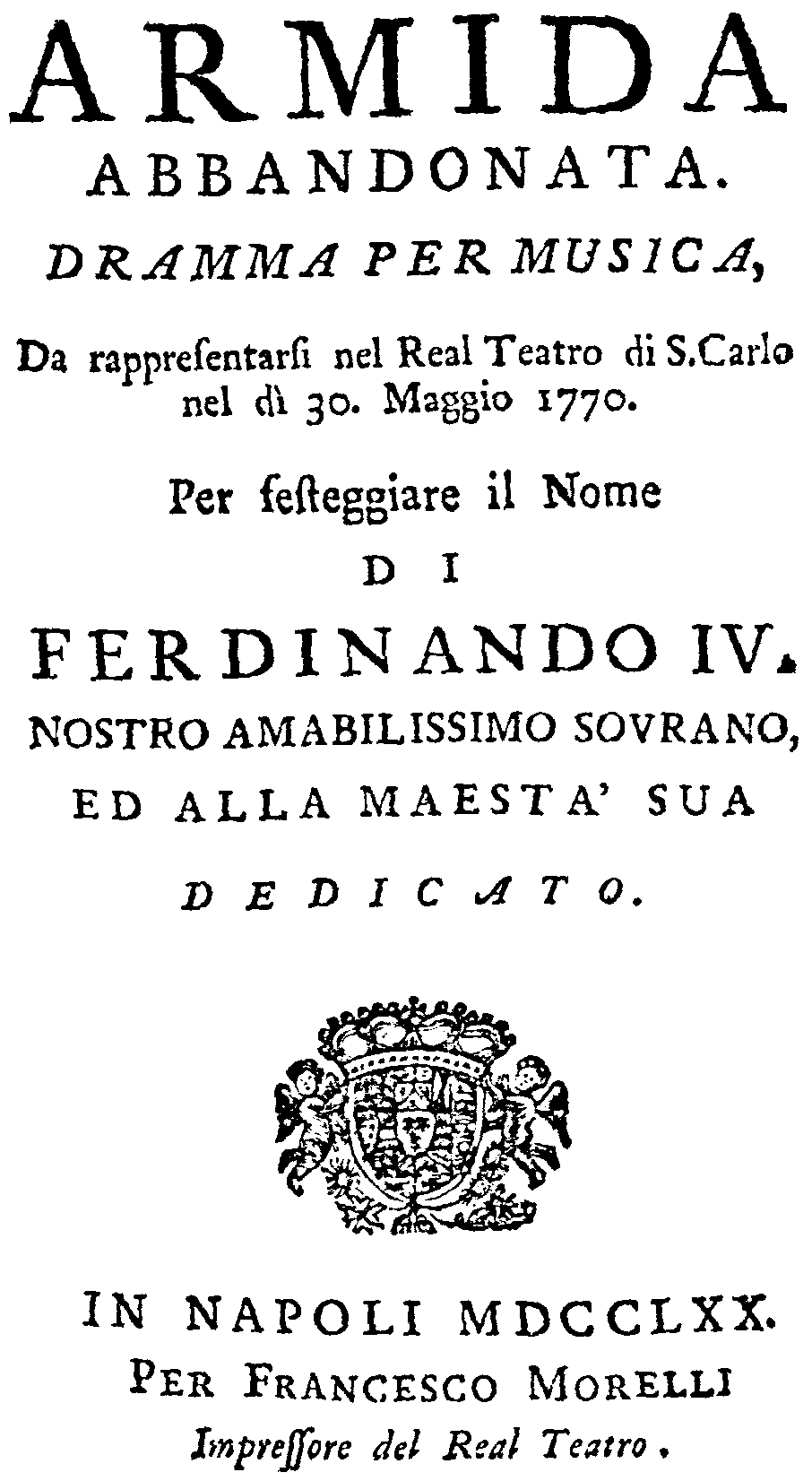
Libretto title page, 1770

Armida Abbandonata (Armida Abandoned) is an opera in three acts by the Italian composer Niccolò Jommelli. The libretto, by Francesco Saverio De Rogatis, is based on the epic poem Jerusalem Delivered by Torquato Tasso. The opera was first performed at the Teatro San Carlo, Naples, on 30 May 1770. The young Wolfgang Amadeus Mozart was in the audience. He described the work as "beautiful but too serious and old-fashioned for the theatre". Nevertheless, despite a lukewarm reception at its premiere, Armida abbandonata was widely performed throughout Italy in the following years.

== Roles ==
Roles, voice types, premiere cast
Role	Voice type	Premiere cast, 30 May 1770 Conductor: Nicola Fabio
Armida	soprano	Maria Anna Lucia De Amicis-Buonsollazzi
Rinaldo	castrato (soprano)	Giuseppe Aprile (Sciroletto)
Tancredi	tenor	Arcangelo Cortoni
Erminia	soprano	Apollonia Marchetti
Rambaldo	castrato (contralto)	Pietro Santi
Dano	castrato (soprano)	Gerlando Speciali
Ubaldo	castrato (soprano)	Tommaso Galeazzi

== Synopsis ==
Act 1
The Courtyard of Armida's castle, a drawbridge is visible. The two Crusader-knights Rambaldo and Tancredi do battle while Erminia, in love with Tancredi and disguised in the armor of Clorinda (Tancredi's beloved) and with the visor down, tries to stop them. Rambaldo has lured Tancredi into Armida's castle and when Erminia asks Tancredi to lay down his arms, he does so, believing that it is the woman he loves – Clorinda – who asks him to surrender. Tancredi is led away and Erminia describes to Rambaldo how misfortune led her to both lose her kingdom and to fall in love with Tancredi. Rambaldo advises her that Tancredi's fate is in Armida's hands and Erminia fears that Armida, too, will fall for the heroic Tancredi (“da quel primiero istante”). The scene moves to the enchanted garden of Armida's palace, with the castle visible in the distance. Dano and Ubaldo having been provided a magic leafy bough by a friendly sorcerer, in their search for Rinaldo have infiltrated the palace grounds. They hide as a group of nymphs approach. In their midst is the disconsolate Rinaldo. Chasing the nymphs away, he reveals that he is jealous of Rambaldo who he believes has won Armida's affections, and he rejects Armida's protestations that she loves only him (“Resta, ingrata; io parto”) before storming off. Rambaldo now arrives with news of the capture of Tancredi but when Armida orders him to inform Rinaldo of this news it is now Rambaldo's turn to show jealousy. The still-defiant Tancredi is led into Armida's presence and when she offers peace and pleasure if he revokes his sacred vows, his response is so violent that Armida in turn rages that in place of peace he will find only death (“se la pieta”). Armida conjures up monsters who attack Tancredi but Dano and Ubaldo emerge from their concealment and with the magic bough drive the monsters away. They tell Tancredi that Rinaldo has been pardoned for his dishonorable dalliance with Armida and leave Tancredi to try to persuade Rinaldo to leave the sinful Armida's realm and return to the Crusader's camp. Tancredi successfully appeals to Rinaldo's honour but realizes that he will require the help of that magic bough to spirit Rinaldo from Armida's spells and leaves. When Armida enters she notices Rinaldo's tumult and uses her wiles to overcome his newly re-discovered sense of honor; when she threatens to stab herself he wrestles the dagger from her hand, they sing a love duet (“Ah, tornate, oh Dio, serene”) and she knows he is still in her power.

Act 2
A room in Armida's vast palace. Erminia is reproaching Rambaldo for not securing Tancredi's release and determines that she herself will approach Armida. Armida is puzzling over why her monsters did not destroy Tancredi when Erminia throws herself at Armida's feet, begging for Tancredi's life. Erminia's tears soften Armida's heart and she agrees to spare Tancredi on the condition that he reveal who saved him from the monsters. Erminia rushes off to release Tancredi from his chains (“Cercar fra i perigli”) and Armida returns to her worries about who saved Tancredi while Rimbaldo tries to comfort her by reaffirming his love for her. He briefly leaves and Armida's dark thoughts return: on his return he brings more disturbing news; he encountered and fought two knights who suddenly disappeared like “mist in the wind”. Armida realizes that the knights have come to seize Rinaldo and she orders Rambaldo to capture the knights so that she may learn the secret of their magic. Left alone she voices her fears that she will lose Rinaldo (“Ah, ti sento, mio povero coro”) Meanwhile, Ubaldo and Dano have found Rinaldo and amid appeals to his honour, Rinaldo sees his reflection in Dano's shield and, appalled at his own image, he renounces Armida a second time. Dano remains with Rinaldo while Ubaldo leaves to find and free Tancredi. We are now in a dungeon in the palace. Tancredi is lamenting that he did not die heroically in battle (“Fra l’orror”) when Erminia bursts in and begs him to save his life by revealing to Armida who saved him from her monsters. Tancredi rejects the offer and even Erminia's entreaties cannot move him. But the door to the dungeon is now thrown open and Ubaldo enters and frees Tancredi from his chains. Now we are in another wing of the vast palace, overlooking a lake. A boat is ready to take Rinaldo and Dano across the lake. They are waiting for Tancredi and Ubaldo when they are discovered by Armida. Rinaldo holds firm to his renunciation of Armida and she, by turns commanding and begging, desperately tries to win him back but he is steadfast until Armida, overwrought, faints. Rinaldo's resolve falters (“Guarda, chi lascio”) but Tancredi and Ubaldo arrive just in time and they all make their escape in the boat. Rambaldo enters and revives Armida who rages at Rinaldo “the traitor” (“Odio, furor, dispetto”). The sky darkens, an earthquake topples the palace and fires break out. “Let this monument to my joys and to my torment crumble and burn” she declares, and she summons the furies to bring her chariot. Climbing in she swears vengeance on Rinaldo, as winged dragons draw the chariot skyward.

Act 3
We are on forested lakeshore. In the distance is the still-smoking island that once hosted Armida's palace. Rinaldo, Tancredi, Ubaldo, Dano and Erminia are joined on the lakeshore by a group of warriors from Duke Goffredo's camp. They bear a letter from the duke: Rinaldo will be forgiven and welcomed back to the crusaders’ fold if he can lift the spell placed on the forest, for the Crusaders need wood to build siege engines to take Jerusalem. Tancredi warns Rinaldo of the terrors he encountered in the forest on his way to rescuing Rinaldo, but Rinaldo gladly accepts the challenge and he enters the forest. We are now in a clearing; a river separates Rinaldo from a giant myrtle that stands alone. Rinaldo crosses via a golden bridge, marveling at the tranquillity and beauty of the forest – no sphinx, nor monsters, nor fire, nor other enchantments (“Giusto Cielo”) but the river swells up and the bridge collapses behind him, and as he approaches the myrtle tree nymphs emerge, playing intoxicating music. Rinaldo pushes his way through to the tree, as if in a dream, and as he raises his sword to strike the tree Armida appears. If he strikes the tree, he strikes her, she declares. Rinaldo wrestles with his feelings but again raises his sword and as he strikes, she disappears, the skies darken, lightning flashes, and monsters pour fourth from the between the trees. Undaunted Rinaldo hacks at the tree until he finally fells it and, the spells broken, serenity returns to the forest. Now we are back on the lakeshore and, reunited with Tancredi, Rambaldo, Ubaldo, Dano and Erminia, Rinaldo leads them all in a prayer for forgiveness, before they depart to enjoy a joyous reunion with their fellow knights in the Crusader's camp.

== Recordings ==
- Armida abbandonata Ewa Malas-Godlewska, Claire Brua, Gilles Ragon, Véronique Gens, Patricia Petibon. Les Talens Lyriques, conducted by Christophe Rousset (FNAC, 1995; reissued by Sound Arts / Ambroisie, 2005 / 2006)
