= Paolo Domenico Finoglia =

Italian painter (c. 1590–1645)

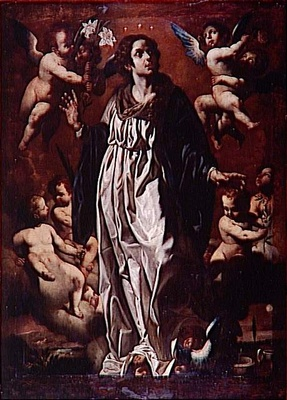
Paolo Domenico Finoglia, Immaculate Conception, 1620, Palais des Beaux-Arts, Lille.

Paolo Domenico Finoglia, or Finoglio (c. 1590 – 1645), was an Italian painter of the early-Baroque period, active mainly in South Italy, including Naples and towns in Apulia.

== Life ==
Finoglia was born in Orta di Atella, near Naples, but sometimes signed his work Neapolitanus. He likely apprenticed with Ippolito Borghese, but derived from Battistello Caracciolo a tenebrist style, similar to that of Caravaggio.

In 1610–1616, he completed a series of works in Lecce, including altarpieces and episodes from Life of Abraham during his stay in Lecce, which now decorate the presbytery of the Church of San Giovanni d'Aymo.

He painted extensively in 1620–1626 in the Certosa di San Martino in Naples. He painted a Baptism of St Celsus (c. 1635) for the Pozzuoli Cathedral. He also painted a number of Immaculate Conceptions, including versions in San Lorenzo Maggiore of Naples; in the Annunziata of Airola; in the church of San Francesco in Montesarchio; and in the Palais des Beaux-Arts in Lille, as well as a Virgin with saints Margaret, Bernard & Anthony of Padua (1634) for the church of Santi Bernardo e Margherita a Fonseca in Naples, and an Annunciation and Bride of the seven canticles for the church of the Annunziata at Airola.

One of Finoglia's masterpieces is the decorative series of ten large canvases on episodes of Torquato Tasso's epic Gerusalemme Liberata. The series was commissioned for the family castle starting in 1634 by the count of Conversano, Giangirolamo II Acquaviva d'Aragona. Finoglia first started working for the Count in 1622, when he decorated the bedroom ceilings with scenes from the story of Jacob and Rachel. He later decorated the church of Santi Cosma e Damiano in Conversano. The decoration of Tasso's work began in 1640, and continued until Finoglia's death in Conversano in 1645. The large canvases include representations of:

- The Torture of Olindo and Sofronia
- The encounter of Clorinda and Tancredi
- The duel between Raimondo di Tolosa and Argante
- Baptism and death of Clorinda
- Rinaldo and Armida in the enchanted garden
- Carlo and Ubaldo urge Rinaldo to fulfill his duty
- Armida tries to restrain Rinaldo
- Rinaldo abandons the enchanted Island
- Erminia discovers the wounded Tancredi
- Rinaldo, victorious, puts the enemy into flight

The paintings had come into private hands, and were re-acquired by the town and rehung in their original places in the Castello. Among his pupils were Carlo Rosa and Nicola Gliri.
