= List of operas by Pasquale Anfossi =

This is a complete list of operas by Pasquale Anfossi (1727–1797).

Anfossi wrote at least 33 opere buffe and drammi giocosi, 26 drammi per musica (opere serie), 8 farse and intermezzi, and 1 'azione drammatica giocosa' (a one-act genre).

== List ==
Title	Genre	Subdivisions	Libretto	Première date	Place, theatre
La serva spiritosa	farsetta	2 parts		carnival 1763	Rome, Teatro Capranica
Lo sposo di tre e marito di nessuna (with Pietro Guglielmi)	commedia per musica	3 acts	Antonio Palomba	autumn 1763	Naples, Teatro Nuovo
Il finto medico	commedia per musica	3 acts		winter 1764	Naples, Teatro Nuovo
Fiammetta generosa (with Niccolò Piccinni)	commedia per musica	3 acts		carnival 1766	Naples, Teatro dei Fiorentini
I matrimoni per dispetto	commedia per musica	3 acts	Antonio Palomba	carnival 1767	Naples, Teatro Nuovo
La clemenza di Tito	dramma per musica	3 acts	Metastasio	30 May 1769	Rome, Teatro Argentina
Armida	dramma per musica	3 acts	Jacopo Durandi after Torquato Tasso	carnival 1770	Turin, Teatro Regio
Cajo Mario	dramma serio	3 acts	Gaetano Roccaforte	autumn 1770	Venice, Teatro San Benedetto
Quinto Fabio	dramma per musica	3 acts	Apostolo Zeno	carnival 1771	Rome, Teatro delle Dame
Nitteti	dramma per musica	3 acts	Metastasio	13 August 1771	Naples, Teatro San Carlo
Lucio Papirio (dubious)	dramma per musica	3 acts	Apostolo Zeno	1771	Rome, Teatro delle Dame
I visionari (dubious)			Giovanni Bertati	1771	Rome, Teatro delle Dame
Alessandro nelle Indie	dramma per musica	3 acts	Metastasio	carnival 1772	Rome, Teatro Argentina
L'amante confuso	commedia per musica	3 acts	Saverio Zini	autumn 1772	Naples, Teatro dei Fiorentini
Il barone di Rocca Antica Act 2 (with Carlo Franchi) (La finta cingara per amore)	intermezzo, revised as farsa	2 acts	Giuseppe Petrosellini	1772	Dresden
L'incognita perseguitata (Matilde ritrovata)	dramma giocoso	3 acts	Giuseppe Petrosellini, after Carlo Goldoni	9 January 1773	Rome, Teatro delle Dame
Demofoonte	dramma per musica	3 acts	Metastasio	carnival 1773	Rome, Teatro Argentina
Antigono	dramma per musica	3 acts	Metastasio	Ascension 1773	Venice, Teatro San Benedetto
Achille in Sciro	dramma per musica	3 acts	Metastasio	carnival 1774	Rome, Teatro Argentina
La finta giardiniera	dramma giocoso	3 acts	Unknown. May have been Giuseppe Petrosellini or Ranieri de' Calzabigi.	carnival 1774	Rome, Teatro delle Dame
Lucio Silla	dramma per musica	3 acts	Giovanni de Gamerra. Originally written for Wolfgang Amadeus Mozart.	Ascension 1774	Venice, Teatro San Samuele
Il geloso in cimento o la vedova bizzarra (La vedova scaltra)	dramma giocoso	3 acts	Giovanni Bertati, after Carlo Goldoni	25 May 1774	Vienna, Burgtheater
Olimpiade	dramma per musica	3 acts	Metastasio	26 December 1774	Venice, Teatro San Benedetto
La contadina incivilita (Il principe di Lagonegro, ossia l'innocente premiata)	dramma giocoso	3 acts	Niccolo Tassi	carnival 1775	Venice, Teatro San Moisè
Didone abbandonata	dramma per musica	3 acts	Metastasio	Ascension 1775	Venice, Teatro San Moisè
L'avaro	dramma giocoso	3 acts	Giovanni Bertati	autumn 1775	Venice, Teatro San Moisè
La vera costanza	dramma giocoso	3 acts	Francesco Puttini	2 January 1776	Rome, Teatro delle Dame
Motezuma	dramma per musica	3 acts	Alvisi Giusti, after Vittorio Amedeo Cigna-Santi?	1776	Reggio Emilia, Teatro Antico detto il Monte di pietà
Isabella e Rodrigo, o sia la costanza in amore	dramma giocoso	2 acts	Giovanni Bertati	autumn 1776	Venice, Teatro Grimani di San Samuele
Il curioso indiscreto	dramma giocoso	3 acts	Giovanni Bertati? Giuseppe Petrosellini? Both?	carnival 1777	Rome, Teatro delle Dame
Gengis-Kan	dramma per musica	3 acts	Vittorio Amedeo Cigna-Santi	carnival 1777	Turin, Teatro Regio
La vaga frascatana contrastata dagli amori umiliati	dramma giocoso	2 acts		May 1777	Ravenna, Teatro Nobile
Adriano in Siria	dramma per musica	3 acts	Metastasio	June 1777	Padua, Teatro Nuovo
Lo sposo disperato (Lo zotico incivilito, Gli sposi in contrasto)	dramma giocoso	2 acts	Giovanni Bertati	autumn 1777	Venice, Teatro San Moisè
Il controgenio	dramma per musica		Giuseppe Petrosellini	carnival 1778	Rome, Teatro Valle
Ezio	dramma per musica	3 acts	Metastasio	Ascension 1778	Venice, Teatro San Moisè
La forza delle donne	dramma giocoso	2 acts	Giovanni Bertati	autumn 1778	Venice, Teatro San Moisè
L'americana in Olanda	dramma giocoso	2 acts	Nunziato Porta	autumn 1778	Venice, Teatro San Samuele
Orlando Paladino (dubious)	dramma per musica		after Ludovico Ariosto	1778	Vienna, Hoftheater
Cleopatra	dramma serio	3 acts	Mattia Verazi	carnival 1779	Milan, Teatro alla Scala
Il matrimonio per inganno	dramma giocoso	2 acts	Giovanni Bertati	spring 1779	Florence, Teatro di Via del Cocomero
Azor, re di Kibinga	dramma giocoso	2 acts	Giovanni Bertati	autumn 1779	Venice, Teatro San Moisè
Le gelosie villane (dubious)	dramma giocoso	2 acts	Tommaso Grandi	1779	Casale Monferrato, Teatro Secchi
Amor costante	intermezzo	2 acts	Giovanni Bertati	carnival 1780	Rome, Teatro Capranica
Tito nelle Gallie	dramma per musica	3 acts	Pietro Giovannini	carnival 1780	Rome, Teatro delle Dame
I viaggiatori felici	dramma giocoso	2 acts	Filippo Livigni	October 1780	Venice, Teatro Grimani di San Samuele
La donna volubile				carnival 1781	Piacenza
Lo sposo per equivoco	intermezzo			carnival 1781	Rome, Teatro Capranica
Il trionfo di Arianna	dramma per musica	2 acts	Carlo-Giuseppe Lanfranchi-Rossi	Ascension 1781	Venice, Teatro San Moisè
L'imbroglio delle tre spose	dramma giocoso	2 acts	Giovanni Bertati	autumn 1781	Florence, Teatro della Pergola
Gli amanti canuti	dramma giocoso		Carlo-Giuseppe Lanfranchi-Rossi	autumn 1781	Venice, Teatro San Moisè
L'infante di Zamora				1781	Paris, Menus-Plaisirs du Roi
Zemira	dramma per musica	2 acts	Gaetano Sertor	carnival 1782	Venice, Teatro San Benedetto
Il disprezzo	azione drammatica giocosa	1 act		carnival 1782	Venice, Teatro Grimiani di San Samuele
Il trionfo della costanza	dramma giocoso		Carlo Francesco Badini	19 December 1782	London
La finta ammalata (dubious)		2 acts	Giovanni Battista Lorenzi	carnival 1782-3	Parma, Teatro di Corte
I vecchi burlati	dramma giocoso		Antonio Palomba	27 March 1783	London, Haymarket Theatre
Chi cerca trova (dubious)				1783 or 1789	Florence, Teatro di Via del Cocomero
Issipile	dramma per musica		Antonio Andrei, after Metastasio	8 May 1784	London, Haymarket Theatre
Le due gemelle	dramma giocoso	2 acts	Girolamo Tonioli	12 June 1784	London, Haymarket Theatre
Gli sposi in commedia (dubious)		2 acts	Antonio Palomba	1784	Piacenza, Teatro Ducale
Il cavaliere per amore (dubious)		2 acts	Giuseppe Petrosellini	1784	Berlin, Königliches Theater
La pazza per amore	dramma giocoso	2 acts		carnival 1785	Correggio, Teatro Pubblico
L'inglese in Italia	dramma giocoso	2 acts	Carlo Francesco Badini	20 May 1786	London, Haymarket Theatre
Le gelosie fortunate	dramma giocoso	2 acts	Filippo Livigni	autumn 1786	Turin, Teatro Carignano
Le pazzie de' gelosi	farsetta	2 acts		carnival 1787	Rome, Teatro Valle
Creso	dramma per musica		Giovacchino Pizzi	carnival 1787	Rome, Teatro Argentina
L'orfanella americana	commedia per musica		Giovanni Bertati	autumn 1787	Venice, Teatro San Moisè
La vilanella di spirito (dubious)		2 acts		1787	Rome
La maga Circe	farsetta	1 act		carnival 1788	Rome, Teatro Valle
Artaserse	dramma per musica	3 acts	Metastasio	carnival 1788	Rome, Teatro delle Dame
I matrimoni per fanatismo	dramma giocoso	2 acts	Carlo Sernicola	1788	Naples, Teatro del Fondo
La gazzetta, o sia il bagiano deuso	farsa	2 acts	Giuseppe Petrosellini	carnival 1789	Rome, Teatro Valle
Zenobia di Palmira	dramma per musica	3 acts	Gaetano Sertor	26 December 1789	Venice, Teatro San Benedetto
L'antiquario (dubious)	opéra comique			1789	Paris, Feydeau
Gli artigiani (L'amor artigiano)	dramma giocoso	2 acts	Giuseppe Maria Foppa, after Carlo Goldoni	spring 1793	Venice, Teatro San Moisè
