= 1780 in music =

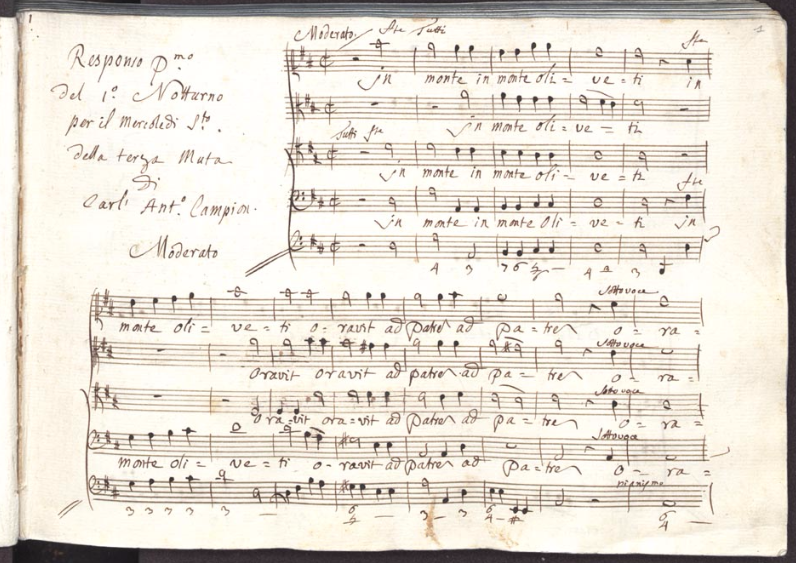
First page of an autographed manuscript of the "Responsiri per la settimana Santa" of 1780, preserved at the Florence Conservatory.

== Events ==
- Wolfgang Amadeus Mozart composes his opera Idomeneo in Munich; it will be premiered in January 1781.
- The Danish royal anthem, "Kong Christian", is first sung.
- Carl Philipp Emanuel Bach's Versuch über die wahre Art das Clavier zu spielen goes into its third edition.
- 1780–1782: C. P. E. Bach revises his Magnificat Wq 215 (H 772) (Hamburg version).

== Classical music ==
- Carl Friedrich Abel – 6 String Trios, Op. 16
- Carl Philipp Emanuel Bach
  - Keyboard Sonata in F major, H.269
  - Keyboard Sonata in A major, H.270
  - Rondo in G major, H.271
  - Geistliche Gesänge, Book 1 H.749
- Johann Christian Bach
  - 6 Sonatas for Keyboard and Violin or Flute, Op.16 (W.B 10-15a)
  - 6 Keyboard Sonatas, Op. 17
  - 2 Keyboard Quintets, Op. 22
- Jean-Jacques Beauvarlet-Charpentier – 12 Noëls avec un Carillon des morts
- Franz Benda – Violin Sonata in C minor, L3.9
- Friedrich Wilhelm Heinrich Benda
  - Viola Concerto in F major, LorB 314
  - 3 Sonatas, Op. 3
- Georg Benda – Sammlung Vermischter Stücke
- Luigi Boccherini
  - 6 String Sextets, G.454-459 (Op. 23)
  - Musica notturna delle strade di Madrid (Op. 30)
  - 6 String Quintets, G.325-330 (Op.31)
  - 6 String Quartets, G.201-206 (Op.32)
- Giuseppe Maria Cambini – 6 Trios for 2 Violins and Cello, Op. 15
- Luigi Cherubini – 6 Harpsichord Sonatas
- Muzio Clementi – 5 Piano Sonatas and a Duet, Op.1a
- Carl Ditters von Dittersdorf – Job (oratorio)
- Fedele Fenaroli – 9 Harpsichord Sonatas
- Joseph Haydn
  - Symphony No. 62
  - Symphony No. 71
  - Symphony No. 74
  - Keyboard Sonata in C major, Hob.XVI:35
  - Keyboard Sonata in D major, Hob.XVI:37
  - Keyboard Sonata in E-flat major, Hob.XVI:38
  - Keyboard Sonata in G major, Hob.XVI:39
- Leopold Kozeluch
  - 3 Keyboard Sonatas, Opp. 1-2
  - 3 Sonatas for Keyboard and Violin, Op. 17
- Franziska Lebrun – 6 Violin Sonatas, Opp. 1-2
- Wolfgang Amadeus Mozart
  - Symphony No. 34 in C major, K.338
  - 3 Minuets, K. 363
- Josef Myslivecek – 6 Divertimenti
- Antonio Rosetti
  - Symphony in D major, M.A12
  - Oboe Concerto in C major, M.C30
- Friedrich Schwindl – 6 Quintets or Trios, Op. 10
- Carl Stamitz
  - Flute Concerto in G major, Op. 29
  - Clarinet Concerto No. 4 in B-flat major
- Johann Franz Xaver Sterkel – Sonata for Violin and Keyboard in B-flat major, StWV 194
- Luigi Tomasini – 3 String Quartets, Op. 8
- Johann Baptist Wanhal – 6 String Trios, Op. 17

== Opera ==
- Domenico Cimarosa
  - Caio Mario
  - Le donne rivali
  - Il falegname
  - I finti nobili
- Franz Danzi – Cleopatra
- André Grétry – Aucassin et Nicolette
- Joseph Haydn – La Fedeltà premiata, Hob.XXVIII:10
- Wolfgang Amadeus Mozart – Zaide (unfinished)
- Josef Myslivecek – Antigono
- Giovanni Paisiello – Il Barbiere di Siviglia
- Niccolò Piccinni – Atys
- Bernardo Porta – La Principessa d'Amalfi
- Joseph Bologne Saint-Georges – L'Amant anonime (premiered March 8)

== Methods and theory writings ==
- Anonymous – ABCDario Musico (Bath: printed for the Authors, and sold at the Rooms, 1780.)
- Salvatore Bertezen – Principi della musica
- Fedele Fenaroli – Regole musicali per i principianti di cembalo
- Johann Adam Hiller – Anweisung zum musikalisch-zierlichen Gesange (Leipzig: Johann Friedrich Junius, 1780)
- Georg Caspar Hodermann – Kurzer Unterricht für Musik-Anfänger
- Louis-Francois Henri Lefebure – Nouveau solfége

== Births ==
- January 14 – François-Joseph Dizi, harpist
- February 2 – Ananias Davisson, shape-note advocate (died 1857)
- February 8
  - Walenty Karol Kratzer, composer
  - Franz Anton Morgenroth, composer (died 1847)
- March 10 – Juan José Landaeta, composer
- May 22 – Jan Emmanuel Dulezalek, composer
- May 28 – Joseph Frohlich, composer
- June 18 – Michael Henkel, composer (died 1851)
- July 25 – Christian Theodor Weinlig, composer
- November 2 – Alexandrine-Caroline Branchu, soprano
- November 3 – Victor Dourlen, composer
- November 16 – Robert Archibald Smith, composer
- November 17 – Franz Clement, composer (died 1842)
- November 22 – Conradin Kreutzer, composer and conductor (died 1849)
- December 18 – Johann Martin Friedrich Nisle, composer (died c. 1861)
- date unknown
  - Ferdinand Gasse, French composer (died 1840)
  - Franciszek Lessel, Polish composer (died 1838)

== Deaths ==
- January 1 – Johann Ludwig Krebs, German composer (born 1713)
- January 4 – Hedvig Wigert, opera singer (b. 1748)
- January 10 – Francesco Antonio Vallotti, organist, composer and music theorist (b. 1697)
- April 21 – Ferdinand Zellbell, composer
- May 9 – Francisco Hernández Illana, Spanish composer (c.1700)
- May 14 – Pierre Montan Berton, Father of Henri-Montan Berton and composer (born 1727)
- August 19 – Bernhard Haltenberger, composer
- September 6 – George Alexander Stevens, songwriter (b. 1710)
- December 14 – Ignatius Sancho, composer and actor (b. c. 1729)
- date unknown – Martin Nürenbach, dancer
