= Lo sposo deluso =

Unfinished opera by W. A. Mozart

Lo sposo deluso, ossia La rivalità di tre donne per un solo amante
- Opera buffa fragment by W. A. Mozart
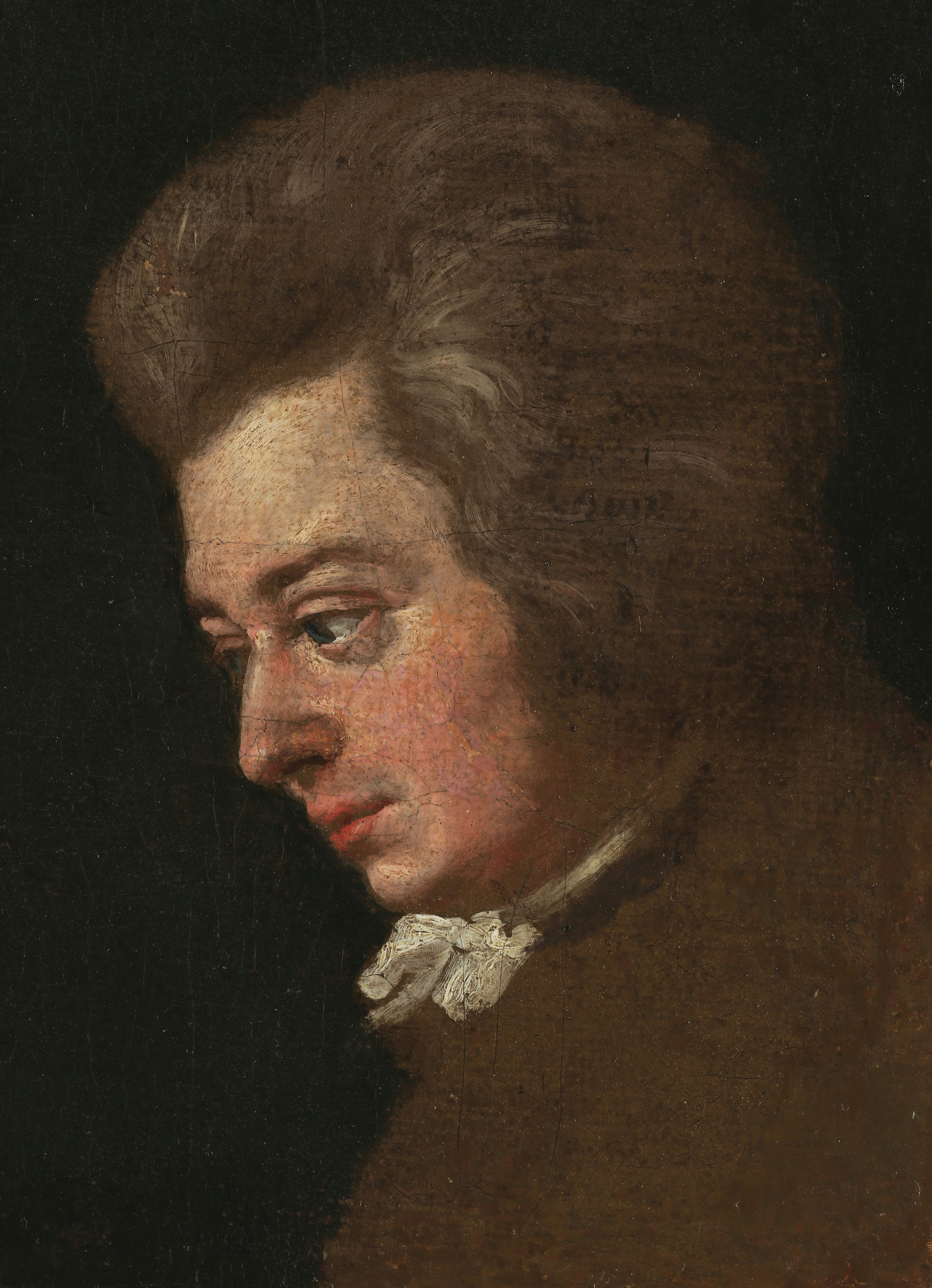
- Detail of Lange's 1782–83 Mozart portrait
- Translation: The Deluded Bridegroom
- Librettist: unknown poet
- Language: Italian
- Based on: libretto for Cimarosa's Le donne rivali

Lo sposo deluso, ossia La rivalità di tre donne per un solo amante (The Deluded Bridegroom, or The Rivalry of Three Women for One Lover) was supposed to be a two-act opera buffa, K. 430, composed by Wolfgang Amadeus Mozart in 1783. However, the opera was never completed and only a 20-minute fragment from act 1 exists.

== Performance history ==
Mozart had originally planned to have the opera performed by a seven-member Italian troupe in Vienna. Although it was once thought that Lorenzo Da Ponte might have been the author of the libretto, scholarship by Alessandra Campana has established that the libretto was written by an unknown Italian poet for Domenico Cimarosa's opera Le donne rivali, which he composed for the Rome carnival season of 1780. According to Neal Zaslaw, Cimarosa's librettist may have been Giuseppe Petrosellini, the house poet of the Teatro Valle where Le donne rivali premiered. (Petrosellini was also the probable librettist of Mozart's earlier opera La finta giardiniera). For Lo sposo deluso, Mozart had the characters in Le donne rivali expanded from five to seven, renamed the original five, and established the cast of singers for whom he would be writing. The composition of Lo sposo deluso was considerably inconsistent, with Mozart sketching several numbers from the first act in no particular order, and a final trio being the only number constituently orchestrated. The rest of the numbers were completed in concept, but ultimately left unfinished.

It is unclear why he abandoned the work, although Zaslaw has proposed that it was a combination of the difficulties presented by re-writing and adapting the libretto for the Viennese audience and the fact that in 1785, Da Ponte had finally come through with the libretto for Le nozze di Figaro. Musicologist Rudolph Angermüller has also proposed that, due to the fact that the work was not commissioned and that the libretto was chosen by Mozart himself, the composer realised subsequently that there was a slim chance of the opera being performed.

The first known performance of material from Lo sposo deluso dates from 15 November 1797, six years after Mozart's death. Mozart's widow, Constanze, arranged for the overture and opening quartet to be performed at the Estates Theatre in Prague during a concert highlighting the musical debut of their youngest son, Franz Xaver Mozart. The identity of the arrangers are unknown, but Zaslaw proposes that one of the composer's pupils or some other "member of his circle" orchestrated the two musical numbers. All of the five numbers have since been completely reconstructed and performed.

The full, incompleted draft was published in November 1882 as part of the Alte Mozart-Ausgabe, and was edited and revised by Gerhard Allroggen in 1988 for the Neue Mozart-Ausgabe.

In 1991, the 200th anniversary of Mozart's death, Opera North premièred The Jewel Box, a pasticcio opera devised by Paul Griffiths. This used the existing pieces from Lo sposo deluso and L'oca del Cairo as well as arias written by Mozart for insertion into operas by Anfossi, Piccini and Cimarosa, among others. (The programme was an imagined reconstruction of a 1783 pantomime in which Mozart and Aloysia Weber are said to have taken part.)

In 2006, the 250th anniversary of Mozart's birth, the fragment of Lo sposo deluso received several performances, including:

- Bampton Classical Opera's revival of The Jewel Box.
- The Salzburg Festival's double bill of Lo sposo deluso and L'oca del Cairo, and other arias written by Mozart in a programme titled Rex tremendus, conceived and staged by Joachim Schlöme with the Camerata Salzburg conducted by Michael Hofstetter. (This performance is preserved on DVD, see Recordings)

== Roles ==
Note that the opera was unfinished and never premiered as such. The singers' names given in the table below are those for whom Mozart wrote the roles and who were to have sung in its premiere.

Roles, voice types, potential premiere cast
Role	Voice type	Intended cast
Bocconio Papparelli, a rich but stupid man, betrothed to Eugenia	bass	Francesco Benucci
Eugenia, a young Roman noblewoman, betrothed to Papparelli but in love with Don Asdrubale	soprano	Nancy Storace
Don Asdrubale, a Tuscan army officer	tenor	Stefano Mandini
Bettina, Papparelli's vain young niece, also in love with Don Asdrubale	soprano	Katherina Cavalieri
Pulcherio, the misogynist friend of Papparelli	tenor	Francesco Bussani
Gervasio, Eugenia's tutor, in love with Metilde	bass	Signore Pugnetti
Metilde, a virtuoso singer and dancer and friend of Bettina, also in love with Don Asdrubale	soprano	Therese Teyber

The setting is a seaside villa near Livorno.

The cast is nearly identical to that of the first Le nozze di Figaro. Benucci was the first Figaro. Storace the first Susanna. Mandini the first Count Almaviva, and Bussani the first Bartolo. Both Mandini and Bussani started as tenors but by this time they were a baritone and a bass respectively.

== Existing pieces from the opera ==
- Overtura – an upbeat, presto instrumental piece which develops into a more lethargic pensive mood
- Quartetto – "Ah, ah che ridere" (Pulcherio, Papparelli, Bettina, Don Asdrubale)
- Aria (fragment) – "Nacqui all'aria trionfale" (Eugenia)
- Aria (fragment) – "Dove mai trovar quel ciglio?" (Pulcherio)
- Terzetto – "Che accidenti" (Papparelli, Don Asdrubale, Eugenia)

== Recordings ==
- Rex Tremendus (Lo sposo deluso, L'oca del Cairo and other fragments by W. A. Mozart) with Ann Murray, Marianne Hamre, Graham Smith, Josef Wagner, Marisa Martins, Jeremy Ovenden, Matthias Klink, Silvia Moi, Miljenko Turk, Malin Hartelius and the Camerata Salzburg conducted by Michael Hofstetter. DVD of the live performance at the 2006 Salzburg Festival (Deutsche Grammophon 0734250)
- 1975 – Clifford Grant (Bocconio), Felicity Palmer (Eugenia), Anthony Rolfe Johnson (Asdrubale), Robert Tear (Pulcherio), Ileana Cotrubaș (Bettina) – London Symphony Orchestra, Sir Colin Davis – CD Philips Classics
- Libertà!, Mozart et l'Opéra. Raphaël Pichon conducting Pygmalion, with Siobhan Stagg, Serena Malfi, Linard Vrielink, John Chest and Nahuel di Pierro. Harmonia mundi. Without the aria "Nacqui all'aria trionfale". Quartet and aria "Dove mai trovar quel ciglio?" arranged by Pierre-Henri Dutron.
