= La finta giardiniera (Anfossi) =

Opera by Pasquale Anfossi

La finta giardiniera is a 1774 opera by Pasquale Anfossi to a libretto by Giuseppe Petrosellini, (sometimes ascribed to Ranieri de' Calzabigi), premiered at the Teatro delle Dame, Rome, for Carnival 1774. The opera by Mozart to the same libretto followed in Munich, 13 January 1775.

== Recording ==
- Nuria Rial (Sandrina), Krystian Adam (Count Belfiore), Maria Espada (Ramiro), Katja Stuber (Arminda), Miljenko Turk (Podestà), Florian Götz (Nardo), Monika Reinhard (Serpetta) L'Arte del Mondo, Werner Ehrhardt 3CD 2013
