= Aureliano in Palmira =

Opera by Gioachino Rossini

- Dramma serio by Gioachino Rossini
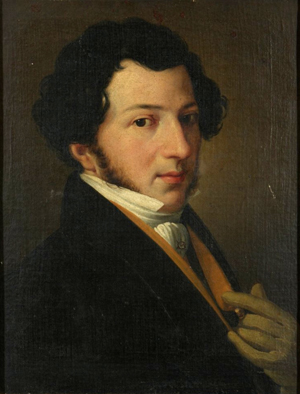
- Rossini ca. 1815
- Librettist: G. F. R.
- Language: Italian
- Based on: Zenobia di Palmira by Pasquale Anfossi
- Premiere: 26 December 1813; La Scala, Milan

Aureliano in Palmira is an operatic dramma serio in two acts written by Gioachino Rossini to an Italian libretto in which the librettist was credited only by the initials "G. F. R." The libretto has generally been attributed to Felice Romani, but sometimes to the otherwise unknown Gian Francesco Romanelli. It has been suggested that the latter name may have resulted from a confusion of Romani with Luigi Romanelli, La Scala's house poet prior to Romani's appointment to the post. (Note: Lindner 1999, pp. 19–20, 30–31 (note 8), explains that the first printed libretto identified the librettist with the initials "G. F. R.", but later librettos and the Ricordi vocal score (1855) "spell out (Giuseppe) Felice Romani", while another libretto from Reggio Emilia (1816), and several others based on it, give the name Gian Francesco Romanelli, or in some cases Gian Francesco Romani, neither of which is otherwise known. The latter attributions, plus stylistic considerations, led Rinaldi (1965) to assume that Felice Romani was not the librettist, and his arguments were later supported by scholars such as Herbert Weinstock, Celletti, and Carlo Marcello Rietmann. However, Rinaldi's "weak argument" was "conclusively refuted" by Marco Beghelli in 1991. Since an early version of the libretto was approved by the censors on 23 June 1813, and Luigi Romanelli, La Scala's house librettist, did not retire until 14 December 1813 when Felice Romani took his place, Lindner states that "it seems possible that 'Gian Francesco Romanelli' is derived from Luigi Romanelli and Felice Romani, owing to later ignorance of the true meaning of the acronym. ... the tight chronological linking of the two could have easily prompted such a blend.")

The story was based on the libretto by Gaetano Sertor for Pasquale Anfossi's 1789 opera Zenobia di Palmira and it centers on the rivalry between the Roman Emperor Aurelian and Prince Arsace of Persia over the beautiful Zenobia, Queen of Palmyra.

The act 1 duet between Zenobia and Arsace, "Se tu m'ami, o mia regina" (If you love me, oh my queen), was greatly admired by Stendhal. Although he had never seen a complete performance of Aureliano in Palmira, he heard the duet in a concert in Paris and described its music as "sublime" and one of the best duets that Rossini had written. (Note: Stendal, Vie de Rossini. Original French: "Ravi par l'accord parfait des voix délicieuses qui nous faisaient entendre 'Se tu m'ami, o mia regina', je me suis supris plusieurs fois à croire que ce duetto est le plus beau che Rossini ait jamais écrit. Ce que je puis assurer c'est qu'il produit l'effet auquel on peut reconnaître la musique sublime: il jette dans une rêverie profonde.", in M. Lévy, 1854, pp. 105–106.) Other music from this opera, particularly the overture, was later reused by Rossini in Elisabetta, regina d'Inghilterra and in The Barber of Seville.

It premiered at La Scala in Milan on 26 December 1813.

== Performance history ==
19th century

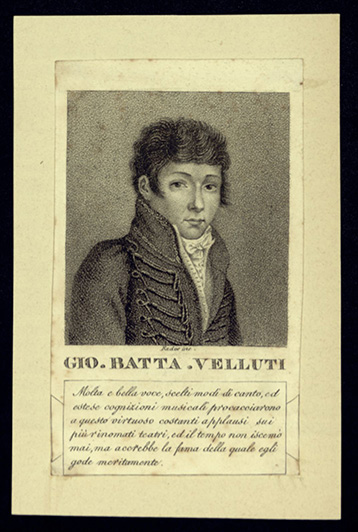
Giovanni Battista Velluti by Luigi Rados

Aureliano in Palmira was Rossini's second commission from La Scala. It opened the theatre's Carnival season with the famed castrato, Giovanni Battista Velluti as Arsace. It was the only role that Rossini wrote for the castrato voice. Rossini had originally written the role of Aureliano for Giovanni David, one of the most renowned tenors of the day. However, throat problems during rehearsals led David to withdraw from the production, and Luigi Mari took his place. The popular soprano, Lorenza Correa, sang the role of Queen Zenobia. The orchestra at the premiere was conducted by Alessandro Rolla, with the staging directed by Alessandro Sanquirico.

The opera's opening night proved disappointing to the Milanese critics who praised the production but considered the music inferior to that of Rossini's Tancredi which had premiered in Venice earlier that year. There was also criticism of the three principal singers. Nevertheless, it had a run of 14 performances at La Scala that season and was performed sporadically in various Italian theatres (including the Teatro di San Carlo in Naples) between 1814 and 1831. It was also performed in London in 1826, again with Velluti as Arsace. The opera then fell more or less into obscurity.

20th century and beyond

Its first modern performance was in September 1980 at the Teatro Politeama in Genoa conducted by Giacomo Zani, with Paolo Barbacini as Aureliano, Helga Müller-Molinari as Arsace, and Luciana Serra as Zenobia. There was another major revival in 1996 at the Rossini in Wildbad Festival conducted by Francesco Corti, with Donald George as Aureliano, Angelo Manzotti as Arsace, and Tatiana Korovina as Zenobia. It was performed again in 2011 in Martina Franca and was given a new production at the Rossini Opera Festival in Pesaro in August 2014. The Pesaro production, conducted by Will Crutchfield and directed by Mario Martone, was the first performance of the critical edition of the opera, which Crutchfield prepared.

== Roles ==
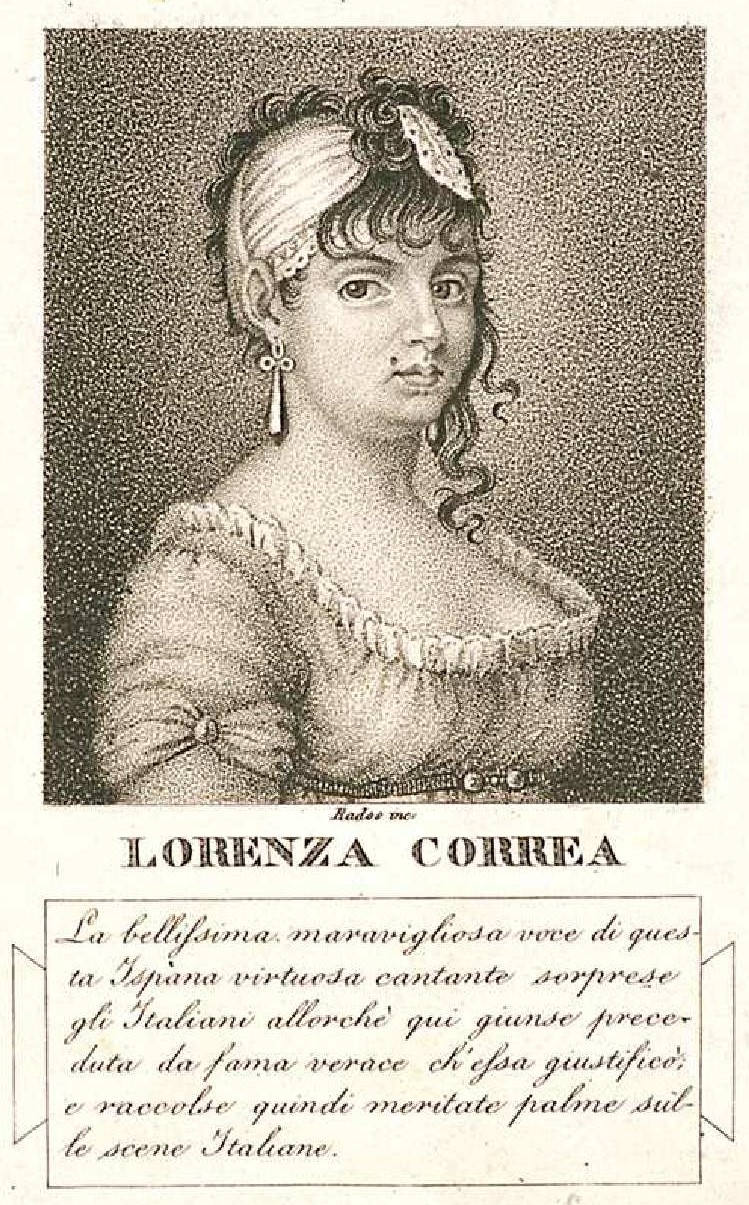
Lorenza Corrèa, who created the role of Zenobia

Roles, voice types, premiere cast
Role	Voice type	Premiere cast, 26 December 1813 Conductor: Alessandro Rolla
Aureliano, Emperor of Rome	tenor	Luigi Mari
Zenobia, Queen of Palmyra, Arsace's lover	soprano	Lorenza Corrèa
Arsace, Prince of Persia	alto castrato	Giovanni Battista Velluti
Publia, Valeriano's daughter, secretly in love with Arsace	mezzo-soprano	Luigia Sorrentini
Oraspe, Palmyran army general	tenor	Gaetano Pozzi
Licinio, a tribune	bass	Pietro Vasoli
Il Gran Sacerdote (High Priest)	bass	Vincenzo Botticelli
Un pastore A shepherd	baritone	?
Priests, Palmyran maidens, Palmyran, Persian, and Roman soldiers; shepherds and shepherdesses; Roman, Palmyran, Persian soldiers

== Synopsis ==
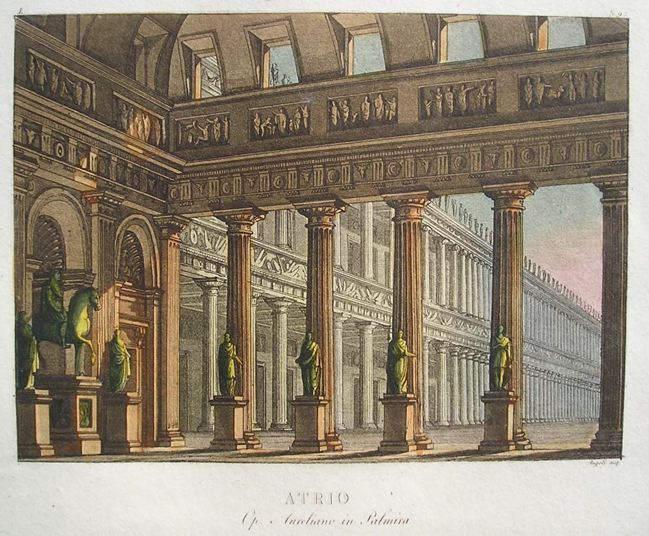
Stage setting from act 1 in the original production at La Scala by Alessandro Sanquirico

Place: in and around the city of Palmyra
Time: 271–272 A.D.

=== Act 1 ===
Queen Zenobia, her lover Arsace, and the priests offer sacrifices in the Temple of Isis and pray for their deliverance from the approaching Roman army. General Oraspe enters to the strains of martial music and announces that Aureliano's Roman army is at the gates of Palmyra. Arsace pledges his Persian troops to defend the city. After a dramatic battle scene on the plains outside the city, the Persians are defeated. The Roman soldiers celebrate their victory. Aureliano arrives and addresses Arsace, now a prisoner. He responds to the Emperor with dignity and affirms his love for Zenobia, saying that he is prepared to die for her.

Inside Palmyra's walls, Zenobia has hidden the kingdom's treasures in the vaults beneath the palace. She decides to make a last stand with her troops to save the city. She asks Aureliano for a truce so that she can speak with him and obtain the liberty of the prisoners, including Arsace. On Aureliano's refusal to free the prisoners, she asks to at least see Arsace for a last time. Zenobia and Arsace weep over their fate. Aureliano enters and promises to free Arsace on condition that he abandons Zenobia. Arsace refuses and is sentenced to death. The Roman and Palmyran armies prepare for a last battle.

=== Act 2 ===
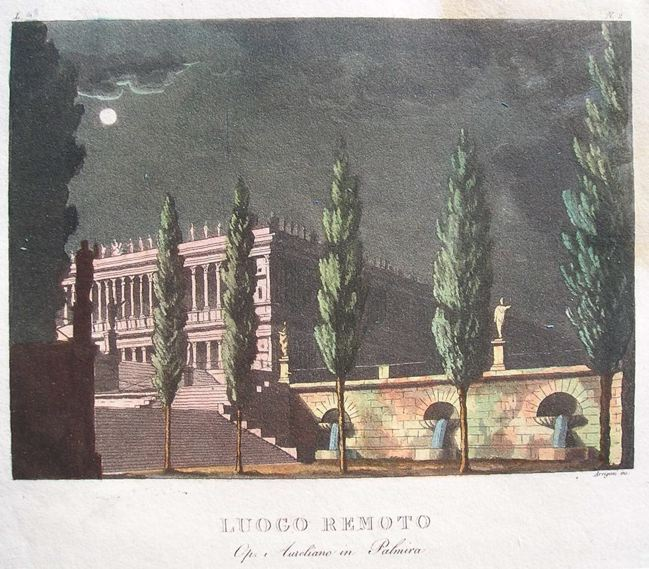
Stage setting from act 2 in the original production at La Scala by Alessandro Sanquirico

Palmyra has now been conquered by the Romans. Aureliano enters Zenobia's palace and offers his love to her, which she refuses. Meanwhile, Oraspe frees Arsace who then flees to the hills by the Euphrates river where he is sheltered by a group of shepherds. Arsace's soldiers join him and tell him that Zenobia has been taken prisoner. Arsace sets off to free her and launch a new attack against the Romans with the Palmyran troops.

In the palace, Aureliano proposes to Zenobia that they reign together over Palmyra. Once again Zenobia refuses. Later that night, Arsace and Zenobia meet again in the moonlight and embrace. When they are discovered by the Roman troops, they ask to die. Although he secretly admires their courage and devotion to each other, Aureliano decrees that they will end their days in separate cells. Publia, the daughter of Roman general and secretly in love with Arsace, begs Aureliano to take pity on him.

The final scene takes place in a large chamber of Zenobia's palace. The leaders and priests of the defeated Palmyrans are gathered in supplication before Aureliano. Oraspe, Arsace and Zenobia are led into the chamber in chains. Aureliano, has a change of heart and frees Zenobia and Arsace to reign together over Palmyra provided they both swear fealty to the Roman Empire. This they do, and praise Aureliano for his generous heart. The chorus sings joyfully, "Torni sereno a splendere all'Asia afflitta il dì" (May the day dawn serene and shining for suffering Asia).

== Recordings ==
Year	Cast: Aureliano, Zenobia, Arsace, Gran Sacerdote	Conductor, opera house and orchestra	Label
1980	Paolo Barbacini, Luciana Serra, Helga Müller-Molinari, Orazio Mori	Giacomo Zani, Orchestra of the Teatro dell'Opera Giocosa di Genova and the Gregorio Magno Chorus. (Live performance at the Teatro Politeama Genovese, Genoa, 11 September)	CD: Sarx ANG; Cat: 97001
1991	Ezio di Cesare, Denia Mazzola, Luciana d'Intino, Antonio Marani	Giacomo Zani, Orchestra Lirico-Sinfonico del Teatro del Giglio di Lucca	CD: Nuova Era; Cat: 232733
1996	Donald George, Tatiana Korovina, Angelo Manzotti, Alexander Alnicolli	Francesco Corti, I Virtuosi di Praga orchestra and the Czech Chamber Chorus (Recording at performances at the Rossini in Wildbad Festival, July)	CD: Bongiovanni; Cat: GB 2201/2-2
2011	Bogdan Mihai, Maria Aleida, Franco Fagioli, Luca Tittoto	Giacomo Sagripanti, Orchestra Internazionale d'Italia and the Coro Slovacco di Bratislava (Recorded at a performance at the Festival della Valle d'Itria, 2011)	DVD: Bongiovanni, Cat: AB 20022
2012	Kenneth Tarver, Catriona Smith, Silvia Tro Santafé, Andrew Foster-Williams	Maurizio Benini, London Philharmonic Orchestra and Geoffrey Mitchell Choir	CD: Opera Rara, Cat: ORC46
2015	Michael Spyres, Jessica Pratt, Lena Belkina, Dmitri Pkhaladze	Will Crutchfield (conductor) Orchestra Sinfonica G. Rossini & Chorus of the Teatro Comunale di Bologna Mario Martone (stage director)	Blu-ray: Arthaus
2018	Juan Francisco Gatell, Silvia Dalla Benetta, Marina Viotti, Baurzhan Anderzhanov	José Miguel Pérez-Sierra, Virtuosi Brunensis, Camerata Bach Choir	CD: Naxos Records; Cat:8660448-50

== Notes and references ==
Notes

Citations

Sources

- Lindner, Thomas (1999). "Rossini's Aureliano in Palmira: A Descriptive Analysis". The Opera Quarterly. 15 (1). Oxford University Press: 18–32. doi:10.1093/oq/15.1.18.
- Osborne, Charles (1994). The Bel Canto Operas of Rossini, Donizetti, and Bellini. Portland, Oregon: Amadeus Press. ISBN 978-0-931340-71-0.
- Osborne, Richard (2007). Rossini: His Life and Works (second ed.). Oxford: Oxford University Press. ISBN 978-0-19-518129-6.
- Rinaldi, Mario (1965). Felice Romani: Dal melodramma classico al melodramma romantico. Rome: De Santis. OCLC 283214.
- Roccatagliati, Allesandro (2001). "Romani, (Giuseppe) Felice" in Sadie 2001.
- Weinstock, Herbert (1968). Rossini: A Biography. New York: Knopf. OCLC 192614.. Reprint (1987): New York: Limelight. ISBN 978-0-87910-071-1.
