= Vorrei spiegarvi, oh Dio! =

1783 soprano aria by W. A. Mozart

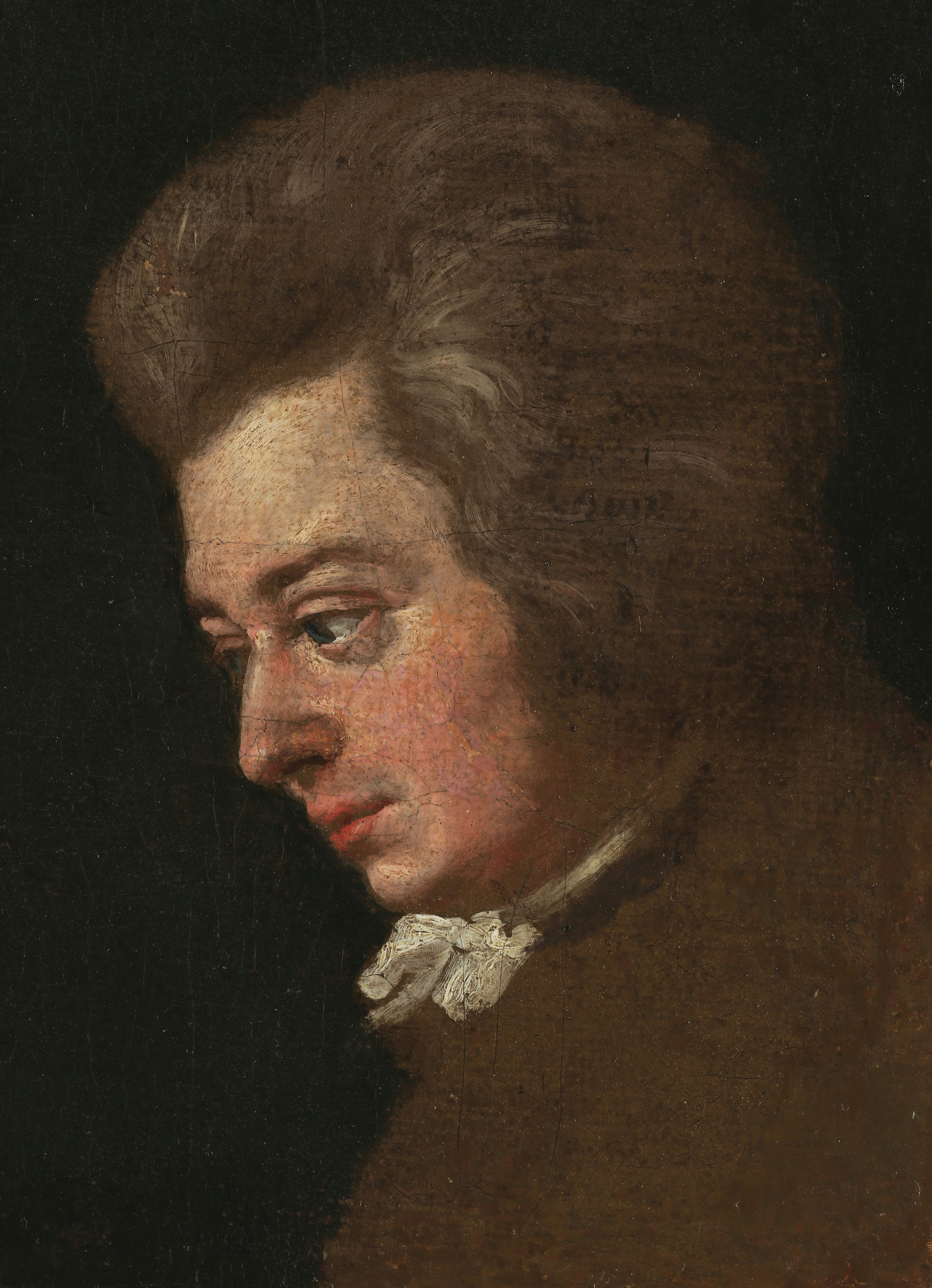
Detail of Lange's 1782–83 Mozart portrait

"Vorrei spiegarvi, oh Dio!" (K. 418) is a soprano aria by Wolfgang Amadeus Mozart.

== History ==
Mozart entered the aria into his catalogue on 20 June 1783 Vienna. It was performed in the Burgtheater, Vienna, on 30 June 1783, as an insertion aria for a performance of Pasquale Anfossi's opera Il curioso indiscreto which had premiered with great success in 1777 in Rome.

Mozart wrote two other insertion arias for that occasion, "No, che non sei capace" (I. 7) (K. 419) and "Per pietà, non ricercate" (II. 4) (K. 420). K. 418 and K. 419 were written for Mozart's sister-in-law Aloysia Weber. K. 420 was written for Valentin Adamberger, but that aria was not performed because of some intrigue initiated by Salieri.

The aria is part of the 1991 pasticcio opera The Jewel Box.

== Music ==
"Ah, spiegarti, oh Dio" was written as a draft for this work just a few days before; it resembles more a piano reduction than a genuine work for piano and soprano. For the final version, the text of the first slow section was changed considerably.

The aria is scored for 2 oboes, 2 bassoons, 2 horns (1 each in D and in A), and strings. The work is 151 bars long and takes about seven minutes to perform. The key signature is A major. The aria is divided into three parts; the first part with a time signature of alla breve and a tempo direction of adagio, ends in bar 80 after a reprise of the initial stanza. The second part is in the time signature of common time and a tempo indication of allegro; at bar 124, the tempo accelerates to più allegro to the words of the last stanza. The aria has a vocal range of 2 octaves plus a fourth (or 2,900 cents), from E_{6} to B_{3}; the latter note is a whole note in bar 135, followed immediately by a whole note D_{6}, an interval of 2 octaves plus a minor third.

== Libretto ==
Giovanni Bertati is often given as the author of the opera's libretto, others credit Giuseppe Petrosellini; however, neither is confirmed.

The aria is inserted at the end of act 1, scene 6, where Marchese Calandro wants to test his bride's Clorinda's fidelity – six and a half years later, in 1790, this was a central theme in Mozart's opera Così fan tutte. Calandro persuades his friend, Count di Ripaverde, to court Clorinda. At his second attempt, Clorinda begins to waver and makes a veiled confession of her love to the Count. But stricken by conflicting emotions and her jealousy of the Count's bride, Emilia, she sends the Count away.

Vorrei spiegarvi, oh Dio!
Qual è l'affanno mio;
ma mi condanna il fato
a piangere e tacer.

Arder non può il mio core
per chi vorrebbe amore
e fa che cruda io sembri,
un barbaro dover.

Ah conte, partite,
correte, fuggite
lontano da me;
la vostra diletta
Emilia v'aspetta,
languir non la fate,
è degna d'amor.

Ah stelle spietate!
nemiche mi siete.
Mi perdo s'ei resta.

Partite, correte,
D'amor non parlate,
è vostro il suo cor.

Let me explain, oh God,
What my grief is!
But fate has condemned me
To weep and stay silent.

My heart may not pine
For the one I would like to love
Making me seem hard-hearted
And cruel.

Ah, Count, part from me,
Run, flee
Far away from me;
Your beloved
Emilia awaits you,
Don't let her languish,
She is worthy of love.

Ah, pitiless stars!
You are hostile to me.
I am lost when he stays.

Part from me, run,
Speak not of love,
Her heart is yours.
