= Il curioso indiscreto =

Opera by Pasquale Anfossi

- Opera by Pasquale Anfossi
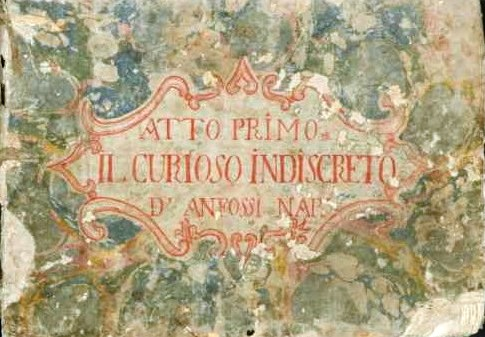
- Cover of a manuscript score for Act 1, c. 1790
- Librettist: Giovanni Bertati or Giuseppe Petrosellini
- Premiere: 1777; Teatro delle Dame, Rome

Il curioso indiscreto ("The Imprudent Curious Man"), is an opera (dramma giocoso) in three acts composed by Pasquale Anfossi. The libretto is based on an episode from the 17th-century Spanish novel Don Quixote. The librettist is not known for sure but is thought to be either Giovanni Bertati or Giuseppe Petrosellini. The opera premiered at the Teatro delle Dame in Rome during the Carnival season of 1777.

== Background and performance history ==
The libretto is based on Chapters XXXIII and XXXIV of Don Quixote in which a curate staying in the same inn as Don Quixote reads aloud one of the innkeeper's favourite stories, "Ill-Advised Curiosity". It is unclear who Anfossi's librettist was. In his 1970 book Das alte Burgtheater als Opernbühne, Otto Michtner lists Giovanni Bertati as the librettist. However, the 2000 edition of The New Grove Dictionary of Music and Musicians notes that could have been either Bertati or Giuseppe Petrosellini. The premiere of Il curioso indiscreto took place during the Carnival season of 1777 at Rome's Teatro delle Dame, where Anfossi's La vera costanza had premiered the previous year. Since women were not allowed to perform on stage in the Papal States at that time, the opera premiered with an all-male cast. The stage design was by Gabriele Montarenzi with costumes by Carlo Brogi and Vincenzo D'Amora. The performance included two untitled ballets choreographed by Giacomo Romolo.

The opera proved very popular and was subsequently performed in many Italian and European cities, including Vienna in 1783. For the Vienna performance, Mozart added two of his own arias, "Vorrei spiegarvi, oh Dio! (K. 418) and "No, no che non sei capace" (K. 419) at the request of Aloysia Weber who was singing the lead soprano role of Clorinda. Il curioso indiscreto was revived in 1984 with a performance at the Mozarteum concert hall in Salzburg which included the two Mozart arias.

== Roles ==
Role	Voice type	Premiere cast, Carnival 1777
Clorinda, betrothed to Marchese Calandrano	soprano castrato travesti	Tommaso Galeazzi
Marchese Calandrano, a curious man	bass	Agostino Liparini
Emilia, Marchese Calandrano's niece	soprano castrato travesti	Gaetano Quistapace
Contino Ripaverde, in love first with Emilia, then with Clorinda	tenor	Vincenzo Calvesi
Prospero, Clorinda's maggiordomo	bass	Luigi Tasca
Aurelio, Marchese Calandrano's friend	tenor	Pietro Natali
Serpina. Clorinda's maid	soprano castrato travesti	Lorenzo Neroni

== Synopsis ==
Marchese Calandrano is afflicted with insatiable curiosity. He is betrothed to the beautiful Clorinda but wonders what she would do if another man paid court to her. He enlists the young Count Ripaverde, who is in love with Calandrano's niece Emilia, to test Clorinda's fidelity. This proves to be Calandrino's downfall, as Ripaverde and Clorinda fall in love. Calandrino's friend, Aurelio consoles Emilia and they too fall in love, as do Serpina (Clorinda's maid) and Prospero, (Clorinda's maggiordomo). The opera ends with the three couples celebrating their new-found happiness together and Calandrano left without a fiancée.

== See also ==
- Anfossi's operas La vera costanza and L'avaro
- Complete list of Anfossi's operas
