= La vera costanza (Anfossi) =

Opera by Pasquale Anfossi

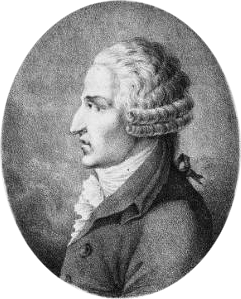
Pasquale Anfossi

La vera costanza ("True Constancy"), is an operatic dramma giocoso in three acts by Pasquale Anfossi. The comédie larmoyante-influenced Italian libretto was by Francesco Puttini. The opera preceded Joseph Haydn's better known setting of the same libretto by three years.

== Performance history ==
The work was first performed on 2 January 1776 at the Teatro delle Dame, Rome. It was successful and performed widely throughout Europe during the following two decades.

== Roles ==
Role	Voice type	Premiere Cast, 2 January 1776 (Conductor: – )
Count Errico, secret husband of Rosina	tenor	Gioacchino Costa/Filippo Tonnini
Rosina, a fisherwoman abandoned by Errico	soprano castrato travesti	Pietro Tiburzj
Marquis Ernesto, friend of Errico	tenor	Francesco Paolo Agresta
Baroness Irene, Count Errico's aunt who wishes to marry Ernesto	soprano castrato travesti	Antonio Rosselli
Villotto, a foolish gentleman, would-be suitor for Rosina	bass	Serafino Blasi
Lisetta, baroness's maid	soprano castrato travesti	Domenico Bruni
Masino, fisherwoman, brother of Rosina	baritone or tenor	Francesco Ciaranfi

== Synopsis ==
See synopsis of the Haydn opera.

== See also ==
- Anfossi's operas L'avaro and Il curioso indiscreto
- Complete list of Anfossi's operas

== Sources ==
- Hunter, Mary (1992), 'Vera costanza, La (i)' in The New Grove Dictionary of Opera, ed. Stanley Sadie (London) ISBN 0-333-73432-7
