= The Jewel Box =

The Jewel Box is a pasticcio opera constructed by Paul Griffiths out of various pieces by Wolfgang Amadeus Mozart. Its mostly English libretto by Paul Griffiths includes new translations of most of the Italian-language texts of the musical numbers. It was premiered by Opera North at the Theatre Royal, Nottingham, on 19 February 1991. The conductor was Elgar Howarth, the director was Francisco Negrin and the designer was Anthony Baker.

== Background ==
Griffiths, realising that arias composed by Mozart for insertion in other composers' operas are seldom performed nowadays, worked up what he called "a jeu d'esprit" which also contained music from the composer's unfinished operas Lo sposo deluso and L'oca del Cairo and some of the arias which he had written for concert performances. This came to the attention of Nicholas Payne, General Director of Opera North, who scheduled its première for 1991, the year of the bicentenary of Mozart's death.

== Performance history ==
After the Nottingham premiere and subsequent performances in Opera North's territory of northern England, the opera was performed in the United States by Skylight Opera Theatre (1993), Wolf Trap Opera (1994), Chicago Opera Theater (1996), and New Jersey State Opera (1996). In England, it was revived by Bampton Classical Opera in 2006 for the 250th anniversary of Mozart's birth, with the orchestra conducted by Edward Gardner.

The Editor of Opera magazine Rodney Milnes was enthusiastic about The Jewel Box; "If anything more ingenious and original happens by way of a special event in Mozart year than Opera North's and Paul Griffiths's The Jewel Box, then I'll eat my hat". He went on - "his greatest triumph has been to string his pearls together into an entirely logical musical order, 'a Mozartian key sequence,' as he wrote, 'through thirds and fifths, and simultaneously distributing the numbers helpfully among the singers". He found that the opera was "a convincing musical entity in its own right, [which] rescues from the library shelf a substantial body of top-drawer Mozart written mostly for the theatre, and indeed returns it to the theatre where it belongs. It's crammed full of great music almost to the point of indigestion".

== Roles ==
Roles, voice types, premiere cast
Role	Voice type	Premiere cast, 19 February 1991 Conductor: Elgar Howarth
Colombina	soprano	Mary Hegarty
Composer	mezzo-soprano	Pamela Helen Stephen
Singer	soprano	Jennifer Rhys-Davies
Dottore	tenor	Mark Curtis
Pantalone	baritone	Quentin Hayes
Pedrolino	tenor	Barry Banks
Father	bass	Stephen Richardson

== Synopsis ==
Four characters from the commedia dell'arte (Dottore, Pantalone, Colombina and Pedrolino) open the opera with a quartet. There is no more music, so the Dottore summons the Composer, who, with the aid of a singer of tragic music and his own father, gradually works out how the opera should go. The opera ends with an epilogue sung by the Composer.

== Musical numbers ==
=== Act 1 ===
Number	Description	First line	Singer(s)	Source	Notes
1	Overture			from Lo sposo deluso, K.430	Wind parts probably not by Mozart
2	Quartet		Colombina, Pedrolino, Dottore, Pantalone	from Lo sposo deluso	Wind parts probably not by Mozart
3	Aria	"You avow that you'll be faithful"	Colombina	"Voi avete un cor fedele", K.217	possibly for insertion into Galuppi's Le nozze di Dorina
4	Aria	"Can no-one explain it?"	Composer	"Chi sà qual sia", K.582	For insertion into Martín y Soler's Il burbero di buon cuore
5	Aria	"Ah, se in ciel, benigne stelle"	Singer	K.583	possibly an entr'acte for C. P. E. Bach's "Die Auferstehung und Himmelfahrt Jesu"
6	Aria	"The goddess of fortune"	Pedrolino	"Si mostra la sorte", K.209	probably for insertion into an opera buffa
7	Arietta	"A kiss on the fingers"	Pantalone	"Un bacio di mano", K.541	for insertion into Anfossi's Le gelosie fortunate
8	Quartet		Colombina, Pedrolino, Dottore, Pantalone	"Mandina amabile", K.480	for insertion into Francesco Bianchi's La villanella rapita
9	Recitative and aria	"This is the one I'm seeking"	Father	"Alcandro, lo confesso", K.512	concert aria
10	Aria	"This young composer"	Dottore	"Clarice cara", K.256	probably for insertion into Piccinni's L'astratto, ovvero Il giocator fortunato
11	Aria	"Souls of greatness and noble spirits"	Composer	"Alma grande e nobil cor", K.578	for insertion into Cimarosa's I due baroni di Rocca Azzurra
12	Quartet		Colombina, Pedrolino, Dottore, Pantalone	"Dite almeno in che mancai", K.479	for insertion as in no. 8 above

=== Act 2 ===
Number	Description	First line	Singer(s)	Source	Notes
13	Trio		Colombina, Pantalone, Father	from L'oca del Cairo, K.422	scoring and completion possibly by Simon Mayr
14	Aria	"Take a look at Pantalone"	Pantalone	"Rivolgete a lui lo sguardo", K.584, removed from Così fan tutte	
15	Gigue			"Eine kleine Gigue", K.574	
16	Aria	"Do not ask, in all compassion"	Pedrolino	"Per pietà, non ricercate" K.420	for insertion into Anfossi's Il curioso indiscreto
17	Aria	"No, che non sei capace"	Singer	"No, che non sei capace", K.419	for insertion as in No. 16 above
18	Aria	"Onward? Still further?"	Composer	"Vado, ma dove", K.583	for insertion as in No. 4 above
19	Recitative and aria	"Enough. It's over"	Colombina	"Basta! Vincesti", K.486a	concert aria
20	Trio		Colombina, Pedrolino, Pantalone	from Lo sposo deluso	
21	Aria	"With due reverence and respect, sir"	Dottore	"Con ossequio, con rispetto", K.210	probably for insertion as in No. 10 above
22	Two andantes			a sketch for mechanical organ, K.615a, and a reprise from No. 1 above	the first andante was adapted for orchestra by Elgar Howarth
23	Aria	"By what this hand's creating"	Father	"Per questa bello mano", K.612	concert aria with double-bass obbligato
24	Aria	"Vorrei spiegarvi, oh Dio!"	Singer	K.418	for insertion as in No. 16 above
25	German Dance			K.571, no. 6	
26	Epilogue	"Now take my thanks"	Composer	"Nehmt meinen Dank", K.383	concert aria
