= L'avaro =

L'avaro (Italian for "the miser") may refer to:

- L'avaro (Anfossi), a 1775 opera by Pasquale Anfossi
- L'avaro or The Miser (1990 film)

== See also ==
- L'Avare, French for The Miser, a 1668 play by Molière
