= Carlo Franchi =

Carlo Franchi may refer to:

- Carlo Franchi (composer) (1743–1779), Italian composer
- Carlo Franchi (born 1938), Italian racing driver, known as Gimax
