= L'avaro (Anfossi) =

Opera by Pasquale Anfossi

- Opera by Pasquale Anfossi
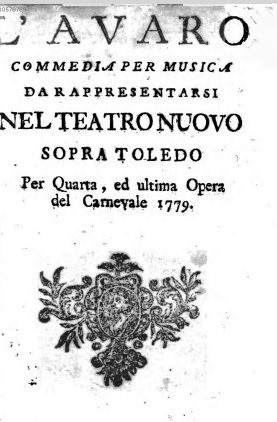
- Cover of the libretto printed in 1779 for a performance at the Teatro Nuovo sopra Toledo in Naples
- Librettist: Giovanni Bertati
- Premiere: 1775; 250 years ago Teatro San Moisè, Venice

L'avaro ("The Miser"), is an opera (dramma giocoso) in three acts composed by Pasquale Anfossi. The libretto by Giovanni Bertati is based on Molière's 17th-century comedy The Miser. Considered one of Anfossi's best operas, it premiered at the Teatro San Moisè in Venice in the autumn season of 1775 and was subsequently performed throughout Italy and in other European cities.

== Background and performance history ==
Anfossi was a prolific composer. L'avaro was the 25th of his 70 or more operas and one of the three which he had composed for the 1775 season at Venice's Teatro San Moisè. His librettist Giovanni Bertati was equally prolific, having written at least 70 libretti in his lifetime, almost all of them in the dramma giocoso genre. The premiere production of L'avaro had sets designed by Domenico and Gerolamo Mauri and costumes by Giuseppe Tadio. The performance was accompanied by a ballet, La serenata interrotta, o sia Il triplice matrimonio ("The Serenade Interrupted, or The Triple Wedding") with music by Francesco Piombanti and choreography by Antoine Pitrot.

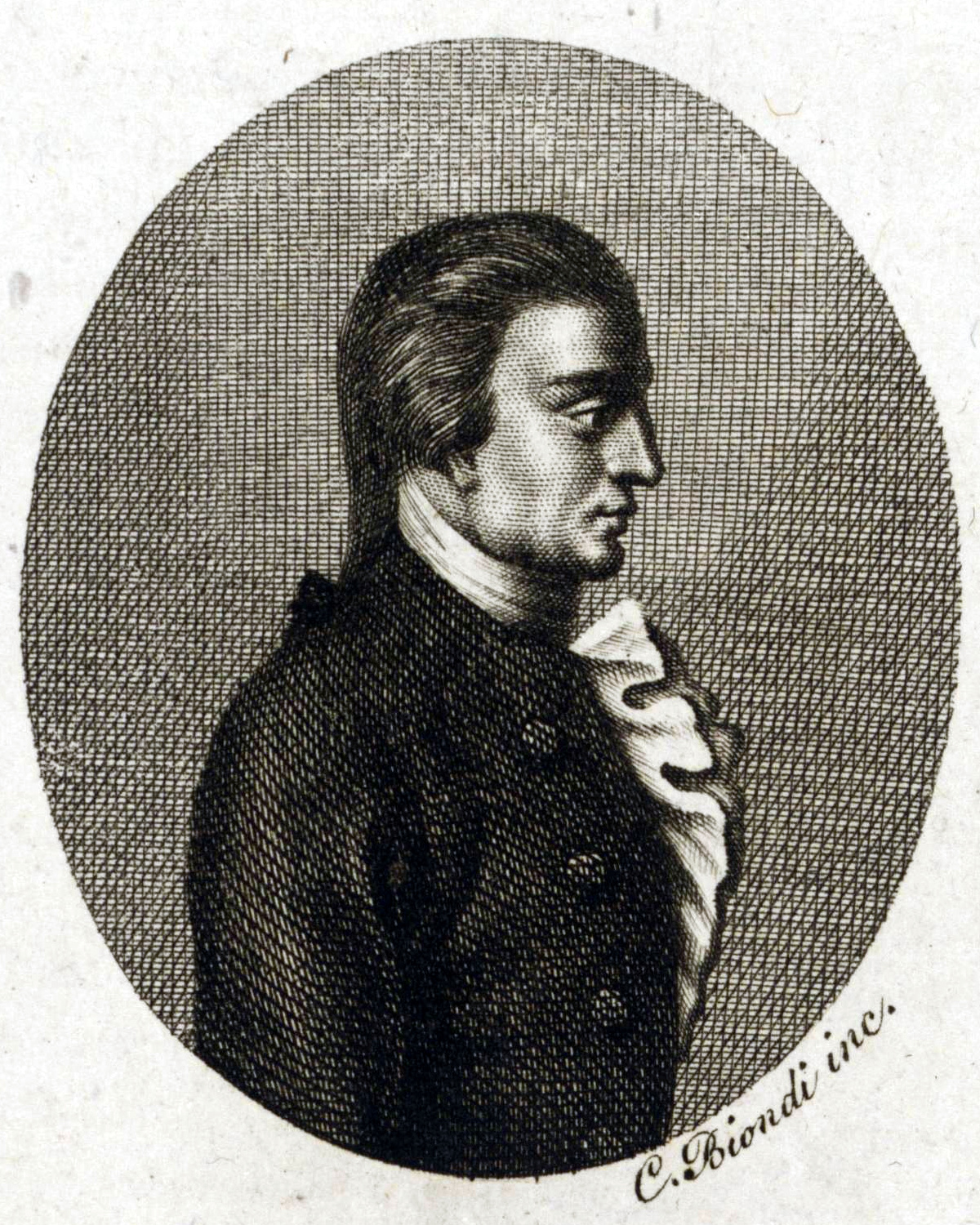
Pasquale Anfossi

The opera proved to be one of Anfossi's most successful works and continued to be staged in its original Italian well into the 19th century. It was performed throughout Italy as well as in Germany, Austria, Denmark, Spain, Belgium, France, and England. The London premiere took place in 1783 at the King's Theatre where Anfossi had been engaged as the music director and was presented in a two-act version. The opera was performed in Hanover and Bad Pyrmont in 1790 using a German translation of the libretto entitled Der Geizige oder Die Liebe ist sinnreich ("The Miser, or Love is Ingenious"). There was a French version entitled Le Tuteur avare ("The Miserly Tutor") with a very freely adapted libretto by Jean-Louis Gabiot and additional music composed by Giuseppe Maria Cambini. It premiered at the Théâtre des Beaujolais in Paris in 1787 and was later performed in Versailles and Lieges. Another freely adapted libretto, this time in Spanish and written by Luciano Comella, was used for performances in Madrid in 1796 under the title El avaro.

L'avaro in the original Italian has also been performed under a variety of other titles including: Il tesoro immaginario ("The Imaginary Treasure"), Brescia, 1779; Il sordo e l'avaro ("The Deaf Man and the Miser"), Brunswick, 1782; and I due avari ("The Two Misers"), Frankfurt, 1783. The alternative title, La fedeltà nell'angustie ("Fidelity Amidst Distress"), is sometimes listed for a performance in Florence in 1777 at the Teatro della Pergola, but later research indicates that it was more likely to have been a revival of Anfossi's La finta giardiniera. The title on a manuscript score dated 1775 and held in the Saxon State and University Library Dresden is given as Il vecchio avaro ("The Old Miser").

Bertati's libretto for L'avaro was subsequently set by several other composers including Gennaro Astarita (1776, Teatro Bonacossi, Ferrara) and Ferdinando Orlandi (1801, Teatro Marsigli-Rossi, Bologna). A different libretto by Giuseppe Palomba, also titled L'avaro and likewise based on the Molière play, was set by Giacomo Cordella and premiered in 1814 at the Teatro de' Fiorentini, Naples.

== Roles ==
Role	Voice type	Premiere cast, Autumn 1775
Orgasmo, an elderly miser, in love with Laurina	bass	Domenico Poggi
Laurina, a young and spirited peasant girl	soprano	Clementina Baglioni Poggi
Stefanello, Orgasmo's son, also in love with Laurina	tenor	Stefano Mandini
Rosalinda, Orgasmo's daughter, engaged to Macrobio but in love with Felicino	soprano	Marianna Dall'Aij
Felicino, an impoverished young man, in love with Rosalinda	tenor	Prospero Bragetti
Macobrio, a deaf old man, Rosalinda's fiancé	bass	Vincenzo Michieletti
Tortora, Orgasmo's maid-servant	soprano	Luisa Allegretti
Two villains and Macrobio's servant (silent roles)

== See also ==
- Anfossi's operas La vera costanza and Il curioso indiscreto
- Complete list of Anfossi's operas
