= La buona figliuola =

Opera from Niccolò Piccinni

- Opera buffa by Niccolò Piccinni
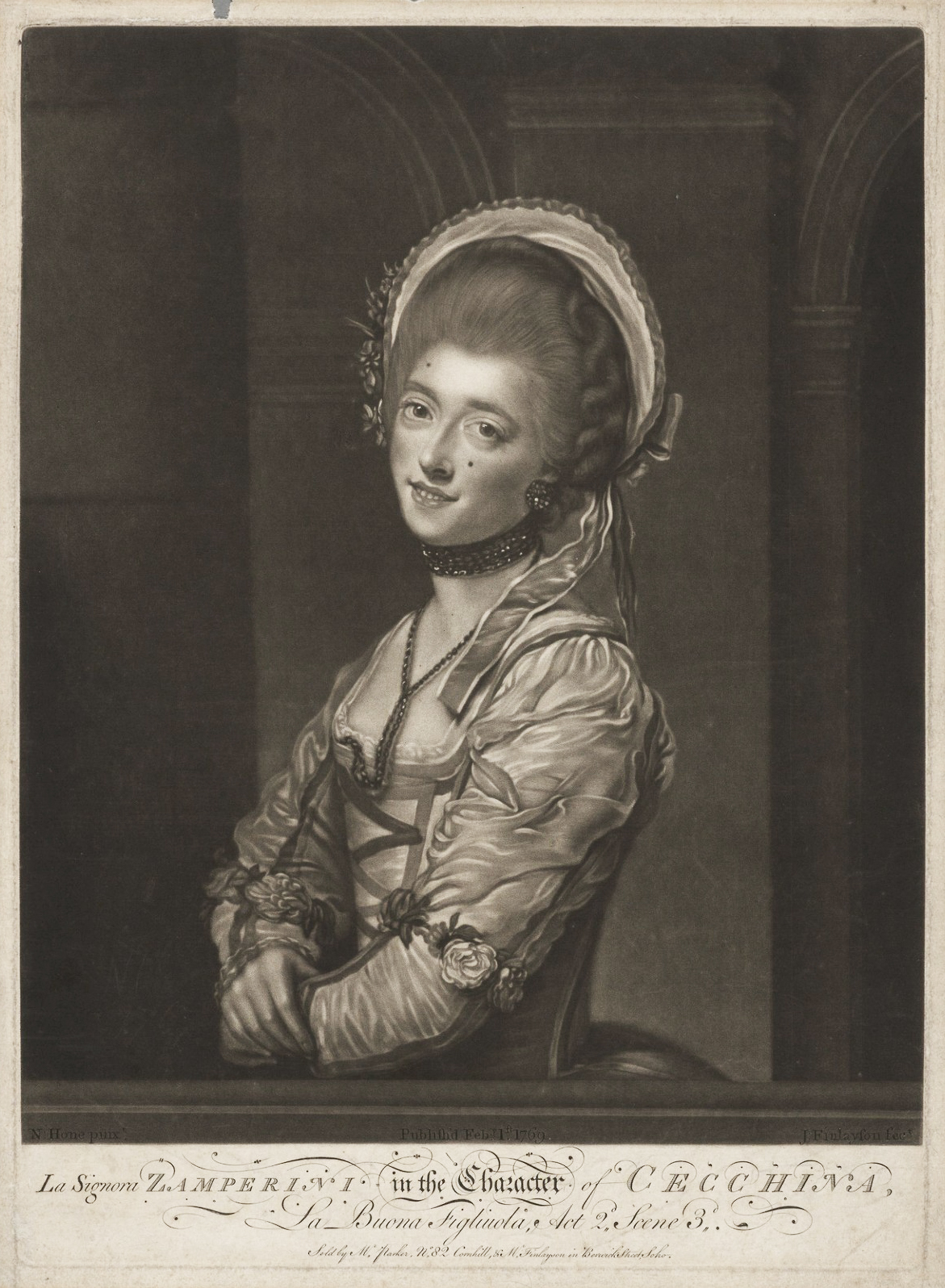
- Antonia Zamperini in the title role, Cecchina, 1769
- Translation: The Good-Natured Girl
- Librettist: Carlo Goldoni
- Language: Italian
- Premiere: 6 February 1760; Teatro delle Dame, Rome

La buona figliuola (The Good-Natured Girl or The Accomplish'd Maid), or La Cecchina (The Girl from Cecchina or Fannie), is an opera buffa in three acts by Niccolò Piccinni. The libretto, by Carlo Goldoni, is based on Samuel Richardson's novel Pamela; or, Virtue Rewarded. This was Piccinni's most successful Italian opera. There was a sequel entitled La buona figliuola maritata (1761) by the same composer and librettist. La buona figliuola supposta vedova by Gaetano Latilla followed in 1766.

== Performance history ==
It was first performed at the Teatro delle Dame, Rome, on 6 February 1760 with an all-male cast. It was given in London at the King's Theatre on 25 November 1766 with Gaetano Guadagni, Savi, Lovattini, Morigi, Quercioli, Piatti, and Michele; and at Covent Garden in English as The Accomplish'd Maid on 3 December 1766. It was revived as La Cecchina (with alterations) on 7 February 1928 in Bari (the composer's native city), as part of a celebration of the bicentenary of Piccinni's birth.

This opera is said to have been performed by Jesuits in China in 1778, namely at the court of the Qianlong Emperor.

== Roles ==
Roles, voice types, premiere cast
Role	Voice type	Premiere cast, 6 February 1760
Cecchina, a maid	soprano castrato travesti	Tommaso Borghesi
Armidoro, engaged to Lucinda	soprano castrato	Carlo De Cristofori
The marquis of Conchiglia, in love with Cecchina	tenor	Giovanni Lovatini
Lucinda, the marquis' sister	soprano castrato travesti	Gaspero Savoj
Mengotto, a poor man in love with Cecchina	baritone	Giuseppe Casaccia
Paoluccia, a maid	mezzo-soprano castrato travesti	Francesco Pieri
Sandrina, a maid	soprano castrato travesti	Giuseppe Giustinelli
Tagliaferro, a German soldier	baritone	Francesco Carattoli

== Synopsis ==
The marquis of Conchiglia has fallen in love with Cecchina, who is a maid. Shocked by the social impropriety of such a match, Cavaliere Armidoro, the fiancé of the marquis's sister, refuses to marry Lucinda. Distraught over losing the man she loves, Lucinda begs the marquis to stop seeing Cecchina. Meanwhile, Cecchina has several problems of her own, including Mengotto, a poor man who is infatuated with her and won't leave her alone, and Sandrina and Paoluccia, two jealous maids who try to cause as much trouble for Cecchina as they can. After many plot twists, the opera ends well when Tagliaferro, a German soldier, reveals that Cecchina is in fact the daughter of a German baron, which enables Cecchina to marry the Marchese without upsetting Armidoro.

== Recordings ==
Piccinni: La Cecchina, ossia La buona figliuola – Orchestra Serenissima Pro Arte

- Conductor: Bruno Campanella
- Principal singers: Alessandra Ruffini, Bruno Pratico, Maria Angeles Peters, Gabriella Morigi, Giuseppe Morino
- Recording date: 8 January 2002
- Label: Nuova Era 7123/25 (3 cd)

Piccinni: La buona figliola – Orchestra del Teatro dell'Opera di Roma

- Conductor: Gianluigi Gelmetti
- Principal singers: Lucia Aliberti, Enzo Dara, Margherita Rinaldi, Emilia Raviglia, Ugo Benelli
- Recording date: 4 February 1981
- Label: Fonit Cetra CDC 95 (2 cd)

Piccinni: La Cecchina, ossia La buona figliuola – La Lyra di Anfione

- Conductor: Vito Paternoster
- Principal singers: Serena Farnocchia, Graziella Merrino, Danilo Formaggia, Eun Young Oh, Larissa Schmidt, Eugenia Pont-Burgoyne, Piero Terranova, Davude Pelissero
- Recording date: 25 September 2001
- Label: Bongiovanni GB 2293/94-2 (2 cd)
