= La finta giardiniera =

Opera by Wolfgang Amadeus Mozart

- Opera by W. A. Mozart
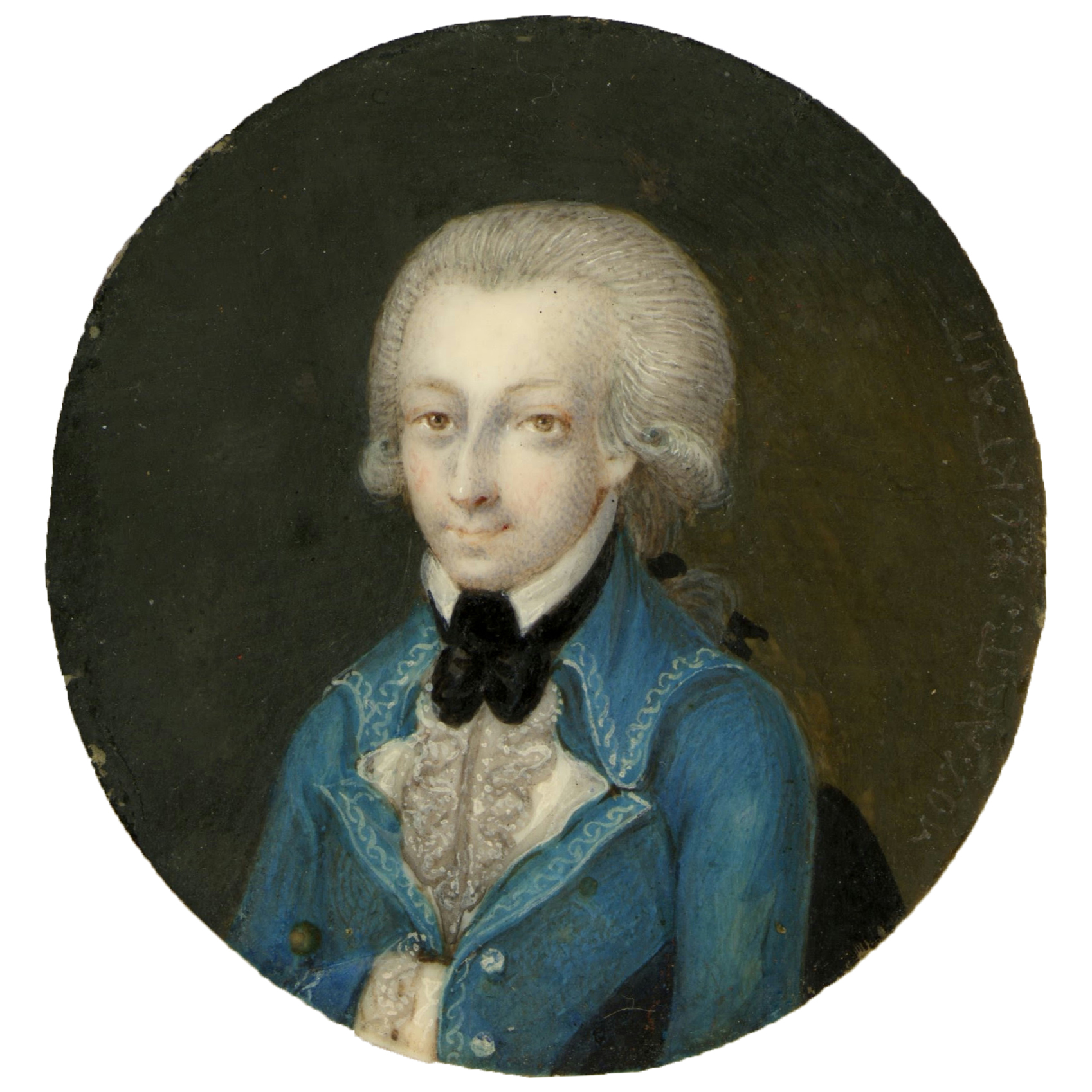
- 1773 miniature of Mozart
- Language: Italian
- Premiere: 13 January 1775; Salvator Theater, Munich

La finta giardiniera ("The Pretend Garden-Girl"), K. 196, is an Italian-language opera by Wolfgang Amadeus Mozart. Mozart wrote it in Munich in January 1775 when he was 18 years old and it received its first performance on 13 January at the Salvator Theater in Munich. There is debate over the authorship of the libretto, written for Anfossi's opera the year before. It is often ascribed to Calzabigi, but some musicologists now attribute it to Giuseppe Petrosellini, though again it is questioned whether it is in the latter's style.

In 1780 Mozart converted the opera into a German Singspiel called Die Gärtnerin aus Liebe (also Die verstellte Gärtnerin), which involved rewriting some of the music. Until a copy of the complete Italian version was found in the 1970s, the German translation was the only known complete score.

== Roles ==
Roles, voice types, premiere cast
| Role | Voice type | Premiere cast, 13 January 1775 Conductor: Johann Nepomuk Cröner |
|---|---|---|
| Don Anchise, the Podestà (Mayor) of Lagonero, in love with Sandrina | tenor | Augustin Sutor |
| Marchioness Violante Onesti (Sandrina), disguised as a gardener | soprano | Rosa Manservisi |
| Arminda, niece of Don Anchise, engaged to Belfiore, formerly in love with Ramiro | soprano | Signora Sutor |
| Contino Belfiore, engaged to Arminda | tenor | Giovanni Valesi |
| Cavalier Ramiro, Arminda's rejected suitor | soprano castrato | Tommaso Consoli |
| Serpetta, the Podestà's servant, in love with the Podestà | soprano | Teresina Manservisi |
| Roberto (Nardo), Violante's servant, disguised as a gardener | bass | Giovanni Rossi |

== Synopsis ==
Time: 18th century
Place: Podestà's estate in Lagonero, near Milan

Summary: The story follows Count Belfiore and the Marchioness Violante Onesti, who were lovers before Belfiore stabbed Violante in a fit of rage. The story begins with the revived Violante and her servant Roberto disguised as "Sandrina" and "Nardo," and quietly working in the mansion of the town Podestà. Violante discovers that Belfiore has become engaged to Arminda, the niece of the Podestà, and when Belfiore confesses his lingering love for Violante, Arminda jealously conspires to abduct the other woman. When Violante is found, she and Belfiore lose their minds and believe themselves to be Greek gods. When they regain their senses Violante forgives the Count and they fly to each other's arms. Arminda returns to Cavalier Ramiro, her spurned suitor, and Roberto finds love with Serpetta, another servant of the Podestà.

=== Act 1 ===
A garden with a wide staircase leading to the mansion of the Podestà.

The Podestà, Cavalier Ramiro, and Serpetta descend the staircase as Sandrina and Nardo work in the garden. Together they praise the lovely day, but their happiness is feigned ("Che lieto giorno"). Sandrina is wretched because Don Anchise, the Podestà, is in love with her. Nardo is frustrated by Serpetta, who teases him but refuses to respond to his affections. Ramiro is bitter after being tossed aside by Arminda, and, because she has set her own cap at the Podestà, Serpetta is angry at Sandrina. The Podestà attempts to console Ramiro, but Ramiro can think of none but Arminda ("Se l'augellin sen fugge"). When they are left alone, Don Anchise professes love to Sandrina ("Dentro il mio petto"). Sandrina refuses his advances as politely as possible and, when Serpetta rudely interrupts, makes her escape.

Arminda's betrothed, Count Belfiore, arrives and is swept off his feet by her beauty ("Che beltà"). Arminda is quick to let him know that she is someone to be reckoned with ("Si promette facilmente"), but the Count is not deterred. The Count then boasts of his deeds and ancestry to the Podestà, tracing his family tree to Scipio, Cato and Marcus Aurelius ("Da Scirocco"). Don Anchise responds with a mixture of awe and skepticism, not caring who this buffoon of a Count is as long as he marries his niece.

In the garden, Arminda sees Sandrina and casually mentions her engagement to Belfiore. Stunned, Sandrina faints. When the Count arrives, Arminda leaves him to watch over Sandrina and rushes off to fetch her smelling salts. Belfiore is shocked to find that the gardener's girl is none other than his lost Violante (Finale: "Numi! Che incanto è questo?"). Arminda returns and is surprised to come face to face with Ramiro. Sandrina awakens and finds herself looking directly into the eyes of Belfiore. The Podestà enters and demands an explanation, but no one knows quite what to say. Sandrina wavers but decides not to reveal herself as Violante, while Arminda suspects that she's being deceived. The Podestà blames everything on Serpetta, who in turn blames Sandrina, and Ramiro is only certain of the fact that Arminda still does not love him.

=== Act 2 ===
A hall in the mansion of the Podestà.

Ramiro discovers Arminda and upbraids her for her inconstancy. When she refuses to listen, he departs, but not before promising revenge upon his rival. Belfiore enters in some distress, muttering that he has had no peace since he found Sandrina. Arminda overhears and confronts him, then leaves ("Vorrei punirti indegno"). Sandrina encounters Belfiore, and nearly betrays herself as Violante when she asks why he stabbed and deserted her. Belfiore is surprised by this outburst and once again sure that he has found his love, but Sandrina quickly reconstructs her disguise. She explains that she is not Violante, but that those were the Marchioness's dying words. Belfiore is nonetheless entranced, since "Sandrina" has the face of Violante, and he begins to serenade her ("Care pupille"). The Podestà interrupts them, and after mistakenly taking the Podestà's hand instead of Sandrina's, Belfiore retreats in embarrassment.

Alone with Sandrina, the Podestà again attempts to woo her. Ramiro interrupts, arriving from Milan with the news that Count Belfiore is wanted for the murder of Marchioness Violante Onesti. Don Anchise summons Belfiore for questioning and the Count, thoroughly baffled, implicates himself. Sandrina says she is Violante and the proceedings break up in confusion. The Count approaches Sandrina but she again denies him. She claims to have pretended to be the Marchioness to save him, and exits. Serpetta arrives moments later to tell the Podestà, Nardo and Ramiro that Sandrina has run away, when she has in fact been abducted by Arminda and Serpetta. The Podestà immediately organizes a search party.

A deserted, mountainous spot.

Abandoned in the wilderness, Sandrina is nearly frightened out of her wits ("Crudeli, fermate!"). Small search parties composed of the Count and Nardo, Arminda, Serpetta, and the Podestà soon arrive (Finale: "Fra quest'ombra"). In the darkness the Podestà mistakes Arminda for Sandrina and she him for the Count, while the Count thinks Serpetta is Sandrina and she takes him for the Podestà. Nardo manages to find Sandrina by following her voice, and Ramiro then appears with footmen and torches. As the embarrassed and mismatched pairs separate, Belfiore and Sandrina find each other and lose their senses. They see themselves as the Greek gods Medusa and Alcides, and the astonished onlookers as forest nymphs. Oblivious of their surroundings, the two begin to dance.

=== Act 3 ===
The courtyard.

Still believing they are gods from classical Greece, Sandrina and Belfiore pursue Nardo until he distracts them by pointing at the sky ("Mirate che contrasto"). They are entranced, and Nardo is able to make his escape. Sandrina and Belfiore leave, and Arminda and Ramiro enter with a harried Don Anchise. Arminda begs her uncle for permission to marry the Count, and Ramiro demands that the Podestà order Arminda to marry him. Don Anchise becomes confused and tells them to both do what they want, as long as they leave him alone ("Mio Padrone, io dir volevo"). After scorning Ramiro's affections yet again, Arminda leaves. Alone, Ramiro furiously swears he will never love another and that he'll die in misery, far from Arminda ("Va pure ad altri in braccio").

A garden.

No longer delusional, the Count and Sandrina awaken after having slept a discreet distance from one another ("Dove mai son?"). Belfiore makes a final appeal, to which Sandrina admits she is Violante but claims that she loves him no more. The Count is saddened but agrees to leave her. They begin to part, but falter in a matter of minutes and fall into each other's arms ("Tu mi lasci?"). Arminda returns to Ramiro, and Serpetta gives way to Nardo's suit. Left alone, the Podestà accepts his fate philosophically. Perhaps, he says, he will find another Sandrina (Finale: "Viva pur la giardiniera").

== Anfossi's Giardiniera ==
Another opera by the same name was composed in 1774 by Pasquale Anfossi.

== Arias ==
The opera's arias include:

Act 1

- 1 Introduzione
- 2 "Se l'augellin sen fugge" – Ramiro
- 3 "Dentro il mio petto" – Don Anchise
- 4 "Noi donne poverine" – Marchioness Violante Onesti (Sandrina)
- 5 "A forza di martelli" – Roberto (Nardo)
- 6 "Che beltà, che leggiadria" – Count Belfiore
- 7 "Se promette facilmente" – Arminda
- 8 "Da sirocco a tramontana" – Count Belfiore
- 9a "Un marito, o dio, vorrei" – Serpetta
- 9b "Un marito, o dio, vorresti" – Roberto (Nardo)
- 10 "Appena mi vedon" – Serpetta
- 11 "Geme la tortorella" – Marchioness Violante Onesti (Sandrina)
- 12 Finale (sextet)

Act 2

- 13 "Vorrei punirti indegno" – Arminda
- 14 "Con un vezzo all'Italiana" – Roberto (Nardo)
- 15 "Care pupille" – Count Belfiore
- 16 "Una voce sento al core" – Marchioness Violante Onesti (Sandrina)
- 17 "Una damina, una nipote" – Don Anchise
- 18 "Dolce d'amor compagna" – Ramiro
- 19 "Ah non partir...Già divento freddo" – Count Belfiore
- 20 "Chi vuol godere il mondo" – Serpetta
- 21 "Crudeli, fermate" – Marchioness Violante Onesti (Sandrina)
- 22 "Ah dal pianto" – Marchioness Violante Onesti (Sandrina)
- 23 Finale II (sextet)

Act 3

- 24a "Mirate che constrasto" – Roberto (Nardo)
- 24b "Da bravi seguitate" (duet Contino, Sandrina)
- 25 "Mio padrone, io dir volevo" – Don Anchise
- 26 "Va pure ad altri in braccio" – Ramiro
- 27a "Dove mai son! (recitative)
- 27b "Tu mi lasci" (duet Contino, Sandrina)
- 28 Finale III (coro, tutti)

== Recordings ==
La finta giardiniera in Italian

- 1980 – Leopold Hager conducting the Salzburg Mozarteum Orchestra, with Julia Conwell (Sandrina), Ezio di Cesare (Podesta), Brigitte Fassbaender (Don Ramiro), Jutta-Renate Ihloff (Serpetta), Barry McDaniel (Nardo), Thomas Moser (Il Contino Belfiore) and Lilian Sukis (Arminda). Originally issued in 4-LP set as DG 2740 234, reissued on 3 CD in Philips Complete Mozart Edition in 1991 as 422 533-2 PME3
- 1989 – Sylvain Cambreling conducting the Orchestre du Théâtre Royal de la Monnaie, with Ugo Benelli (Podesta), Joanna Kozlowska (Sandrina), Marek Torzewski (Il Contino Belfiore), Malvina Major (Arminda), Lani Poulson (Don Ramiro), Elżbieta Szmytka (Serpetta) and Russel Smythe (Nardo). Recorded live at La Monnaie in June 1989, with production directed by Gérard Mortier. Originally issued in 3-CD set as Ricercar Secondo B0106U1BZQ, reissued on 3 CDs on Brilliant Classics, both as individual reissue and in the Mozart: Complete Works box set.
- 1991 – Nikolaus Harnoncourt conducting Concentus Musicus Wien, with Monica Bacelli (Don Ramiro), Edita Gruberová (Sandrina), Uwe Heilmann (Il Contino Belfiore), Charlotte Margiono (Arminda), Thomas Moser (Podesta), Anton Scharinger (Nardo) and Dawn Upshaw (Serpetta). Teldec 9031-72309-2 (3 CD)
- 2012 – René Jacobs conducting the Freiburger Barockorchester, with Nicolas Rivenq (Podesta), Sophie Karthäuser (Sandrina (Violante)), Alex Penda (Arminda), Jeremy Ovenden (Contino Belfiore), Marie-Claude Chappuis (Ramiro), Sunhae Im (Serpette) and Michael Nagy (Roberto (Nardo)). 3 CD Harmonia Mundi (HMC 902126.28)
- 2014 – DVD (2 discs) & Blu-ray (1 disc) . Production of Opéra de Lille. Emmanuelle Haïm conducting Le Concert d'Astrée, with Marie-Caude Chappui (Don Ramiro), Erin Morley (Sandrina), Enea Scala (Il Contino Belfiore), Marie-Adeline Henry (Arminda), Carlo Alemanno (Podesta), Nikolay Borchev (Nardo) and Maria Savastano (Serpetta). Erato 08256-461664-5-9.

Die Gärtnerin aus Liebe in German

- 1972 – Hans Schmidt-Isserstedt conducting the North German Radio Symphony Orchestra, with Ileana Cotrubaș (Serpetta), Helen Donath (Sandrina), Werner Hollweg (Graf Belfiore), Jessye Norman (Arminda), Hermann Prey (Nardo), Tatiana Troyanos (Don Ramiro) and Gerhard Unger (Podesta). Originally issued in 3-LP set as Philips 6703 039, reissued on 3 CD in Philips Complete Mozart Edition in 1991 as 422 534-2 PME3
- 2017 – (titled Die verstellte Gärtnerin) Andrew Parrott conducting the Munich Radio Orchestra, with Lydia Teuscher (Serpetta), Sandrine Piau (Sandrina), Julian Prégardien (Graf Belfiore), Susanne Bernhard (Arminda), Michael Kupfer-Radecky (Nardo), Olivia Vermeulen (Don Ramiro) and Wolfgang Ablinger-Sperrhacke (Podesta). Recorded live in 2017 in Munich, which was broadcast on the BR-Klassik radio station, and was issued in 2022 as a 3-CD set on the CPO label, in cooperation with BR-Klassik.
