= Le donne rivali =

- Intermezzo by Domenico Cimarosa
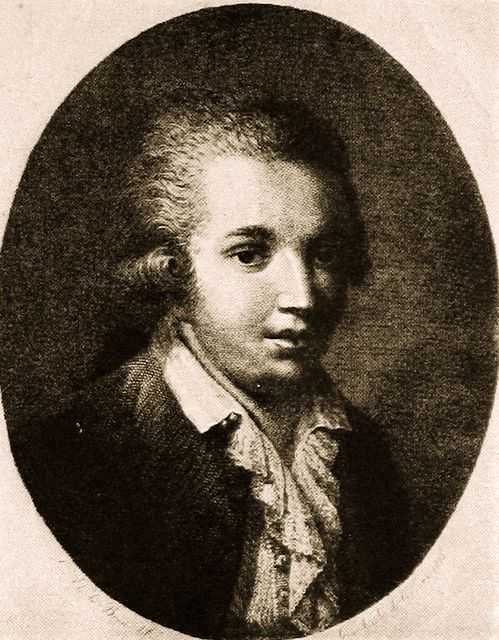
- The composer
- Language: Italian
- Premiere: 1780; Teatro Valle, Rome

Le donne rivali is an intermezzo in two acts by composer Domenico Cimarosa with an Italian libretto by a now unknown poet. It is speculated that Giuseppe Petrosellini may have been the author of the libretto. The opera premiered at the Teatro Valle in Rome during Carnival in 1780. The original choreography was created by Alberto Cavos, the original costumes by Antonio Dian, and the original scenery by Domenico Fossati. In accordance with Papal law on theatre in Rome, the premiere cast was all-male.

The opera was later produced in Venice and Florence, and in 1789, in French, in St. Petersburg.

In recent years, Le donne rivali has been occasionally revived and recorded. In 1991, the Juilliard Opera Center intertwined the work with Mozart's unfinished opera Lo sposo deluso, which shares the same libretto, to make one large work.

== Roles ==
Role	Voice type	Premiere Cast, Carnival 1780 (Conductor: – )
Fernando	tenor	
Laurina	soprano castrato travesti	Giuseppe Censi
Sempronio Pippistrelli	baritone	Michele Del Zanca
Don Annibale	tenor	Giuseppe Lolli
Emilia	soprano castrato travesti	Domenico Bruni

== Recordings ==
- Le donne rivali with conductor Alberto Zedda and the Orchestra di Padova e Veneto. Cast includes: Alessandra Ruffini (Laurina), Anna Rita Taliento (Emilia), Emanuele Giannino (Annibale), Bruno Praticò (Sempronio) and Bruno Lazzaretti (Fernando). Recorded live in September 1994.
