= Marie-Claude Chappuis =

Swiss operatic mezzo-soprano

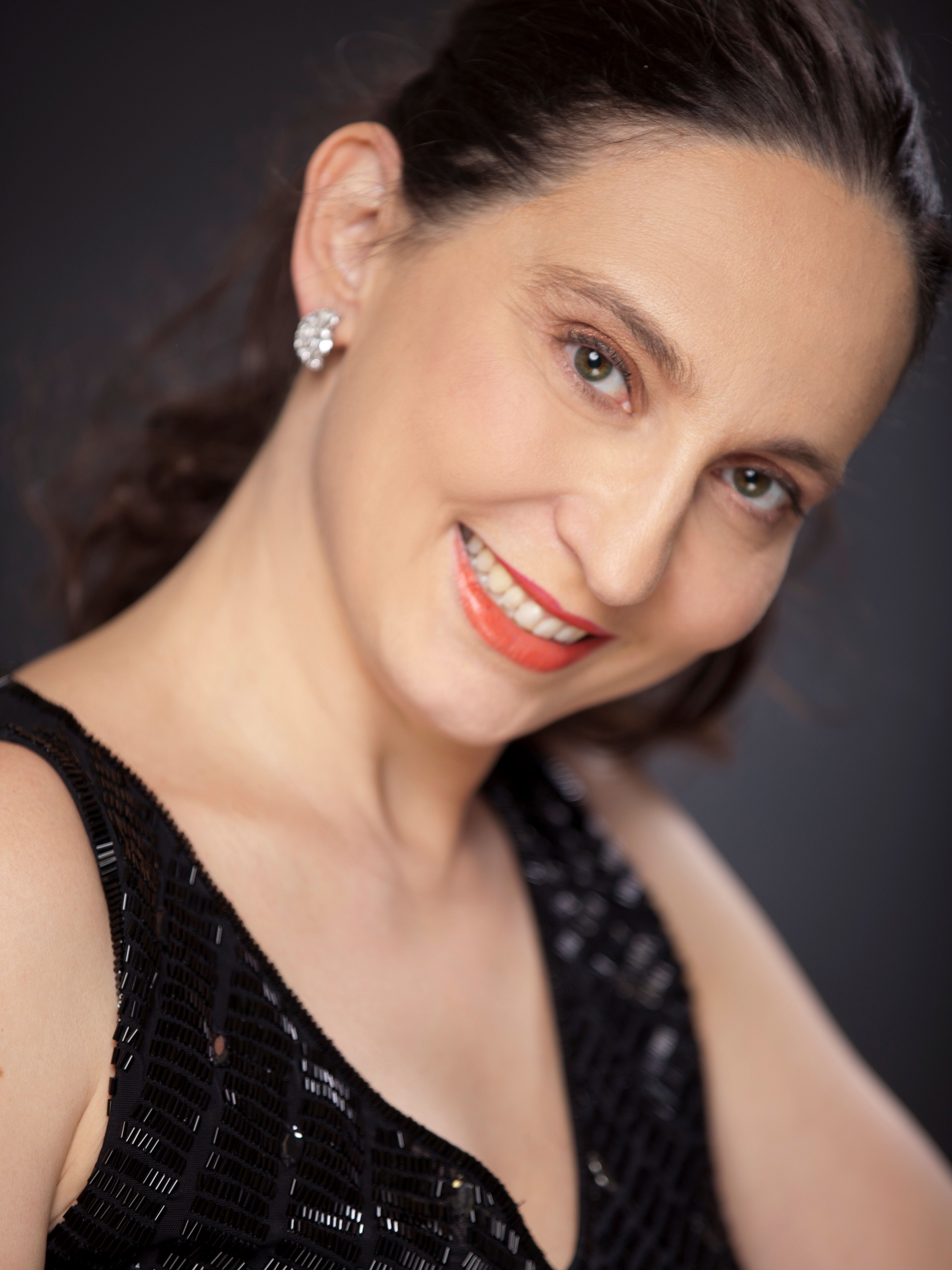
Marie-Claude Chappuis

Marie-Claude Chappuis is a Swiss mezzo-soprano particularly known for her performances in baroque operas and sacred music.

== Life ==
Chappuis was born in Fribourg and grew up in the village of La Brillaz in a family of singers. Her mother Thérèse was in fact one of the Abbot Pierre Kaelin's choristers. She began her singing studies at the Fribourg Conservatory. She continued her musical training at the Mozarteum Orchestra Salzburg, where she was awarded the prize for excellence in virtuosity.

At the end of her musical training, she briefly joined the Innsbruck Opera under the direction of Brigitte Fassbaender. Since 2003, she has performed on numerous international stages, notably in Europe and Asia.

Over the years, she has worked with renowned conductors such as Roger Norrington, Riccardo Chailly and Nikolaus Harnoncourt. Amongst others, she performed Idamante in the Idoménée production in Graz and Zurich, conducted and directed by Nikolaus Harnoncourt. She also played Dido in Dido and Aeneas by Henry Purcell. In 2017, she made her debut at La Scala and then joined the Theater an der Wien (Hedwige in William Tell) in 2018.

A virtuoso in baroque singing, Chappuis founded the Lieder Festival in Fribourg in 2001.

In 2017, she released a record entitled "Sous l’empire d’Amour". and in 2018 a record of folksongs from Switzerland entitled "Au cœur des Alpes".

With René Jacobs she recorded La clemenza di Tito nominated to the Grammy Awards, La Finta Giardiniera, Rappresentatione di Corpo ed Anima where she performs Anima, La Brockes-Passion by Telemann as well as St Matthew Passion by Johann-Sebastian Bach.

== Voice ==
A mezzo-soprano singer, she has a vast repertoire and performs solo roles in classical and romantic operas, Lieder and popular songs, sacred music, and French Baroque Opera.
