= Ranieri de' Calzabigi =

Italian poet and librettist (1714–1795)

Ranieri de' Calzabigi (Italian pronunciation: [raˈnjɛːri de kaltsaˈbiːdʒi]; 23 December 1714 – July 1795) was an Italian poet and librettist, most famous for his collaboration with the composer Christoph Willibald Gluck on his "reform" operas.

Born in Livorno, Calzabigi spent the 1750s in Paris, where he became a close friend of Giacomo Casanova. Here he explored his interest in opera, producing an edition of the works of Pietro Metastasio, the most famous librettist of opera seria. However, Calzabigi was also impressed by French tragédie en musique, and eager to reform Italian opera by making it simpler and more dramatically effective. In 1761 he settled in Vienna, where he met likeminded reformers: Gluck; Count Giacomo Durazzo, the theatre director; Gasparo Angiolini, the choreographer; Giovanni Maria Quaglio, the set designer; and the castrato Gaetano Guadagni. Together they worked on Gluck's groundbreaking Orfeo ed Euridice in 1762. Calzabigi then wrote the libretto for Alceste, which further abandoned the practices of opera seria in favour of "noble simplicity". In the preface to this work, to which Gluck put his signature, Calzabigi set out his manifesto for reforming opera. A third collaboration, Paride ed Elena, followed in 1770. Calzabigi also contributed to the scenario of Gluck's reformist ballet, Don Juan, in 1761.

La finta giardiniera, set by Pasquale Anfossi in 1774 and Wolfgang Amadeus Mozart in 1775, has been ascribed to Calzabigi, but this is now regarded as doubtful.

In 1774 Calzabigi was banished from the Viennese court as the result of a scandal and took up residence in Pisa and in 1780 in Naples, where he wrote his last two librettos, Elfrida (1792) and Elvira (1794), both set to music by Giovanni Paisiello, and continued his literary activities until his death.

== Legacy ==
German composer Georgina Schubert (1840-1878) used Calzabigi's text for her song "Romanza."
