= Antigono (Mysliveček) =

Opera by Josef Mysliveček

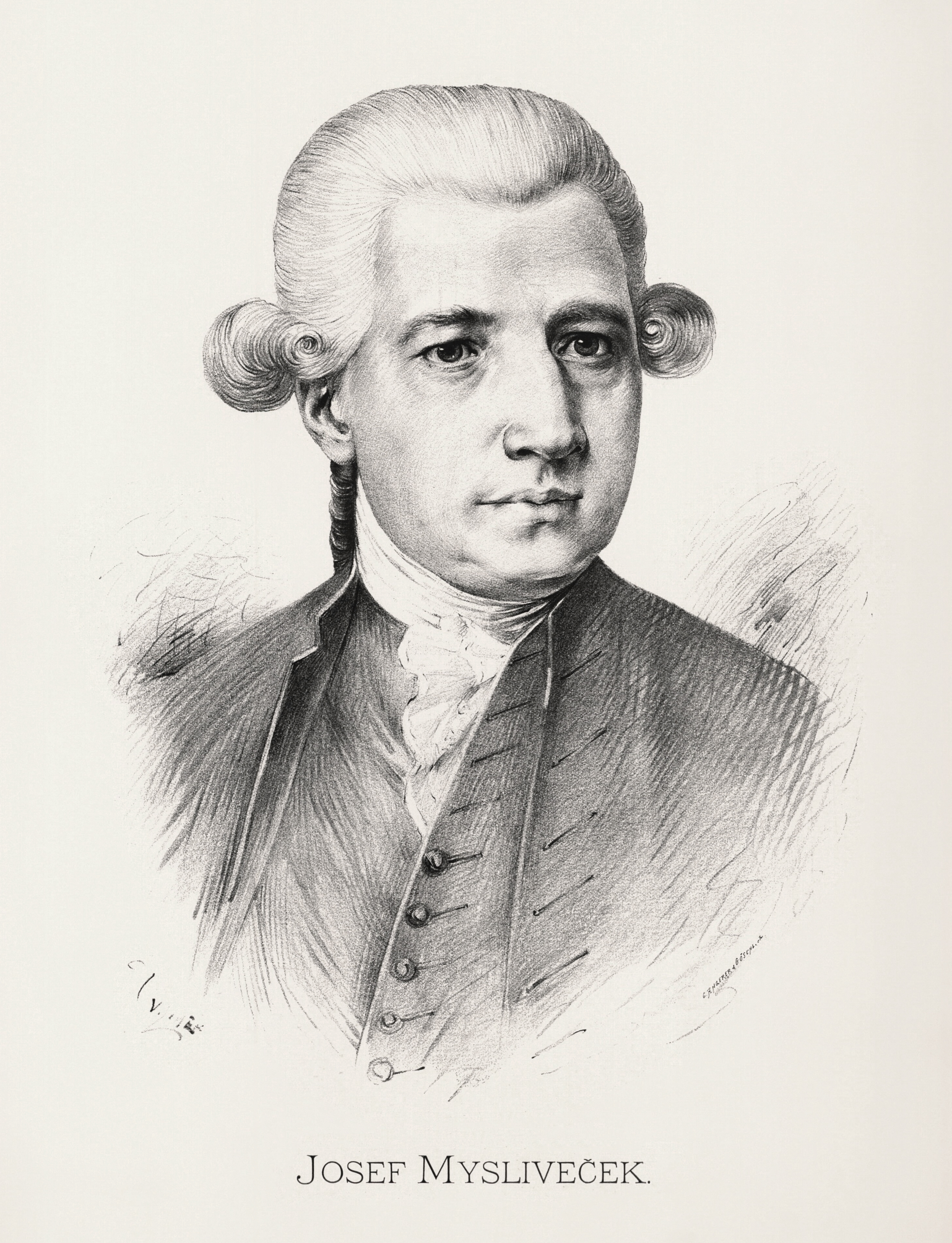
Josef Mysliveček

Antigono is an 18th-century Italian opera in 3 acts by the Czech composer Josef Mysliveček composed to a libretto by the Italian poet Metastasio first produced in 1744 with music of Johann Adolf Hasse. This opera (and all the rest of Mysliveček's operas) belong to the serious type in Italian language referred to as opera seria that usually carried the designation dramma per musica in librettos. For a performance in the 1780s, it would only be expected that a libretto by Metastasio would be abbreviated and altered to suit contemporary operatic taste. The cuts and changes in the text made for the performance of Mysliveček's version are not attributable.

== Performance history ==
Antigono was the composer's last opera, first performed at the Teatro delle Dame in Rome on 5 April 1780 at a time when he was deathly ill with syphilis—he had only a few months more to live. He did have the pleasure to enjoy one last successful operatic production before he became completely incapacitated; the production did redeem the failure associated with the opera Armida that was performed during the early part of the year.

No score survives for Mysliveček's last opera, but some of the arias are known from their inclusion in collections copied throughout Europe. The most successful of these was the vocal rondò "Ho perduto il mio tesoro," which was disseminated in music prints and manuscripts well into the 19th century. It was particularly popular in England in the form of arrangements for voice and piano—and one arrangement of it was even published in Philadelphia in the late 1790s. All of the performers in the production were male, since women were prohibited from appearing on stage in Roman theaters until Pius VII was elevated to the Holy See in the year 1800. Some also appeared in Il Medonte a few months earlier. The most distinguished cast members were the tenor Giovanni Ansani, a close professional associate of the composer, and the castrato Pietro Benedetti, the original interpreter of the rondò "Ho perduto il mio tesoro."

== Roles ==
Cast	Voice type	Premiere, 5 April 1780, Teatro delle Dame, Rome
Antigono	tenor	Giovanni Ansani
Demetrio	soprano castrato	Pietro Benedetti
Berenice	soprano castrato	Giuseppe Benigni
Alessandro	soprano castrato	Michelangelo Bologna
Ismene	soprano castrato	Silvestro Fiammenchi
Clearco	alto castrato	Lorenzo Galeffi

== Vocal set pieces ==
Act I, scene 1 - Aria of Ismene, "Di vantarsi ha ben ragione" (music lost)
Act I, scene 3 - Aria of Demetrio, "Fra tanti affanni" [a non-Metastasian text]
Act I, scene 5 - Aria of Berenice, "Io non so se amor tu sei" (music lost)
Act I, scene 8 - Aria of Antigono, "Tu m'involasti un regno" (music lost)
Act I, scene 10 - Aria of Alessandro - "Meglio rifletti al dono"
Act I, scene 13 - Duet for Demetrio and Berenice, "Non temer, non son più amante" [a non-Metastasian text]

Act II, scene 1 - Aria of Clearco, "Pianta, che sorge in alta" [a non-Metastasian text] (music lost)
Act II, scene 2 - Aria of Alessandro, "Sai quell'ardor m'accende" (music lost)
Act II, scene 3 - Aria (Rondò) of Demetrio, "Ho perduto il mio tesoro" [a non-Metastasian text]
Act II, scene 6 - Aria of Ismene, "Perchè due cori insieme" (music lost)
Act II, scene 9 - Aria of Antigono, "Se mai senti, amato bene" [a non-Metastasian text] (music lost)
Act II, scene 11 - Cavatina of Berenice, "Non partir bell'idol mio"
Act II, scene 11 - Aria of Berenice, "Perchè se tanti siete"

Act III, scene 1 - Aria of Antigono, "Dì che ricuso il trono" (music lost)
Act III, scene 3 - Aria of Demetrio, "Tu regna felice" [a non-Metastasian text] (music lost)
Act III, scene 4 - Cavatina of Berenice, "È pena troppo barbera" [a non-Metastasian text] (music lost)
Act III, scene 6 - Chorus, "Doppo torbida procella" (music lost)

== Plot ==
The Egyptian princess Berenice is betrothed to the Macedonian King Antigono, but is actually in love with his banished son Demetrio. Antigono's daughter Ismene loves Alessandro, king of Epirus, who is the enemy of Macedonia. The opera portrays a violent struggle between Antigono and Alessandro. Typical for opera plots in the genre of opera seria, identities and the emotional relations between the characters become confused, and there is intense competition for love partners. Everything is resolved through the forgiveness of King Antigono at the end, with Berenice allowed to marry Demetrio.
