= Symphony No. 71 (Haydn) =

Symphony in four movements by Joseph Haydn

Joseph Haydn

The Symphony No. 71 in B-flat major, Hoboken I/71, is a symphony by Joseph Haydn. It was composed by 1780.

== Music ==
The symphony is scored for flute, two oboes, bassoon, two horns and strings.

It is in four movements:

1. Adagio, 4/4 – Allegro con brio, 3/4
2. Adagio in F major, 2/4
3. Menuetto & Trio, 3/4
4. Finale: Vivace, 4/4

After dark string sonorities reminiscent of Sturm und Drang in the slow introduction, the Allegro begins with a very light galante theme which is interrupted periodically by more darkly colored strings. The transitional material is notable for its use of counterpoint.

The slow second movement is a theme with four variations and a coda. The second variation features a flute and bassoon duet over thirty-second notes and pizzicato bass. Triplet-sixteenths dominate the third variation. As usual, the final variation is recapitulatory, but here Haydn extends the variation with further development and a cadenza-like passage.

The trio of the minuet features solo sections for two violins against a pizzicato bass.
