= Carlo Franchi (composer) =

18th-century Italian opera composer

Carlo Franchi (sometimes given as de Franchi, de Franchis or de Franco, circa 1743 – d. after 1779) was an Italian opera composer known for his opere buffe. He belonged to the Neapolitan school of composers, and it is likely that he was born in or near Naples, where his first opera La vedova capricciosa had its premiere in 1765. Subsequent works were performed in Rome, Venice, Mantua, Turin, Florence, and outside Italy in places such as Dresden and Lisbon.

His intermezzo Il barone di Rocca Antica (Rome, 1771), written jointly with Pasquale Anfossi, was influential in the development of opera buffa.

== Works ==
- La vedova capricciosa, commedia per musica (Naples, Nuovo, carnival 1765)
- Ifigenia in Aulide, (Rome, Argentina, 1766)
- La clemenza di Tito, (Rome, Argentina, 1766)
- Arsace, dramma per musica (Venice, Teatro San Benedetto, 1768)
- La pittrice, intermezzo (Rome, Pace, 1768)
- Il gran Cidde Rodrigo, dramma per musica (Turin, Teatro Regio, 1768)
- La contadina fedele, intermezzo (Rome, Valle, carnival 1769)
- Il tronfio della costanza, opera semiseria (Turin, Carignano 1769)
- Le astuzie di Rosina e Burlotto, dramma giocoso (Perugia, Leon d'Oro, carnival 1770)
- Siroe, re di Persia, dramma per musica (Rome, Argentina, 1770)
- La pastorella incognita, (Naples, Teatro Fiorentini, 1770)
- Il barone di Rocca Antica, intermezzo (Rome, Valle, 1771): Act 1 by Franchi
- La semplice, intermezzo, (Rome, Valle, 1772)
- Farnace, dramma (Rome, Dame, 1772)
- La finta zingara per amore, farsa (Rome, Tordinona, carnival 1774): believed to be a revision of Il barone di Rocca Antica
- I tre amanti ridicoli, (Mantua, Ducale, carnival 1779)

== Sources ==
- Ciliberti, Galliano (1992), 'Franchi, Carlo' in The New Grove Dictionary of Opera, ed. Stanley Sadie (London) ISBN 0-333-73432-7
