= Giovanni Battista Velluti =

Italian castrato (1780–1861)

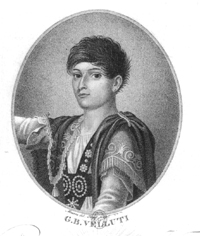
Giovanni Battista Velluti as a young man

Giovanni Battista Velluti, colloquially "Giambattista" (28 January 1780 – 22 January 1861), was an Italian castrato. Considered "the last great castrato", he had a reputation of being something of a diva, with some singers refusing to appear with him.

== Biography ==
Born in Pausula (near Macerata), Italy, a local doctor castrated him at the age of eight as treatment for a cough and high fever. Velluti's father, who had planned on a military career for his son, enrolled him in musical training. He became close friends with Luigi Cardinal Chiaramonte, the man who would become Pope Pius VII, after the Cardinal witnessed Velluti's singing of a cantata sometime in his teenage years. In 1800, he made his debut at Forlì.

The last great castrato roles were composed specifically for him: Arsace in Rossini's Aureliano in Palmira (1813) and Armando in Meyerbeer's Il crociato in Egitto (1824). He made his London debut in 1825 in Il crociato in Egitto. The crowds reacted poorly to his initial performances—he was the first castrato to appear in London in 25 years—but he nevertheless drew crowds until the end of his career.

In 1826 he took over management of The King's Theatre in London and appeared there in Aureliano in Palmira and Morlacchi's Tebaldo ed Isolina. However, his career as a theatre manager ended following financial quarrels over extra pay for the chorus. He returned to London in 1829, but appeared only in concerts where a young Felix Mendelssohn saw him. Mendelssohn reportedly was scared of him.

Upon his retirement from the stage, he became an agriculturist. He died in 1861 at the age of 80.
