= Symphony No. 74 (Haydn) =

Symphony in four movements by Joseph Haydn

Joseph Haydn

Symphony No. 74 in E♭ major, Hoboken 1/74, is a symphony by Joseph Haydn composed in 1780 or 1781.

== Music ==
The symphony is scored for flute, two oboes, bassoon, two horns, and strings.

There are four movements:

1. Vivace assai, 4/4
2. Adagio cantabile in B♭ major, 2/4
3. Menuetto & Trio: Allegretto, 3/4
4. Finale: Allegro assai, 6/8

The first movement opens in standard Italian style with three loud chords followed by a quiet response. The second theme group is based on an inversion of the quiet response.

The second movement opens like a serenade with muted violins playing a melody over a guitar-like accompaniment in the cello. What follows is a set of three loosely structured variations which avoid the simple strophic pattern of previous sets by allowing the lead-ins and interludes to overlap and a coda which features a small fugato.

The minuet features Lombard rhythms and the trio lets the first violin and the bassoon carry the melody.

The finale is gigue-like and in sonata form.
