= Francisco Hernández Illana =

Spanish composer

Francisco Hernández Illana (c. 1700 in Valencia? – 1780 in Burgos) was a Spanish composer. He was maestro de capilla of El Patriarca in 1728, and published a set of Cantadas al Santísimo.
