= Vito Paternoster =

Italian cellist

Vito Paternoster is an Italian cellist, recording for Musicaimmagine. He has served as principal cellist for I Musici (Rome).

Paternoster is the first cellist to record the complete Bach Sonatas and Partitas for Solo Cello (orig. violin), after locating an anonymous transcription, from Bach's time, next to Bach's own manuscript of the violin masterpieces.

Paternoster also recorded a CD called Inzaffirio, a distillation of the preludes from Bach's Cello Suites - following each prelude is an arrangement for soprano, solo cello, and string orchestra accompaniment.

Paternoster teaches at the Bari Conservatory (Italy).
