= Rondò =

Late-18th-century type of operatic aria

Rondò (Italian pronunciation: [ronˈdɔ]) is a type of operatic vocal solo, popular in the late 18th century. The name identifies both a musical form and the type of materials used.

== History ==
The rondò became the most fashionable showpiece aria type in Italian opera during the last three decades of the 18th century. Although Mozart was far from being the first composer to use the rondò, he was certainly the most important. He refined and deepened the form, particularly by creating smoother transitions between the slow and fast sections. He first adopted it for Belmonte’s "Wenn der Freude Tränen fliessen" in his 1782 Singspiel Die Entführung aus dem Serail. Subsequently he began using them in opera seria, first in the 1786 revival of Idomeneo, when he inserted a new aria, "Non temer, amato bene", in rondò form. In the same year he provided another one for Der Schauspieldirektor, and initially sketched (but ultimately rejected using) a rondò for Susanna's garden aria in Le nozze di Figaro. Two later Mozart operas with rondòs are Don Giovanni and Così fan tutte (Fiordiligi’s “Per pietà, ben mio, perdona”). For his last opera, La clemenza di Tito, Mozart wrote a pair of rondòs: Vitellia’s "Non più di fiori" and Sesto’s "Deh per questo istante".

Other notable composers of the period to compose rondòs include Giuseppe Sarti (Giulio Sabino, 1781) and Domenico Cimarosa, whose Olimpiade (1784) includes two long rondòs for the prima donna, Aristea, and the primo uomo, Megacle. The longer of the two goes to the hero in the penultimate scene of the opera. Joseph Haydn employed the form in 1784 for the aria "Dei pietosi" in Armida.

== Form ==
The rondò is distinct from the refrain form called rondo. In recent English and German musical literature, the Italian spelling and pronunciation (with accent on the last syllable) has been adopted to distinguish this from the (predominantly instrumental) form called rondo (with accent on the first syllable). No such distinction was made in the late 18th century when this vocal type flourished; the spellings rondo, rondò, rondeau, rondeaux, and even rondieaoux were used indiscriminately for both musical forms.

The leading feature of the rondò as a form is its division into two sections with contrasting tempos. The opening part is slow, and presents a theme that often returns after a contrasting section to form an ABA pattern. This is followed by a concluding faster part, beginning either with a new theme or with a faster variation of the slow section’s main theme. Sometimes the text associated with the main theme of the slow section recurs in the second half as well. In the opera, these arias are generally assigned only to the prima donna or primo uomo and are strategically placed in or near the concluding scene or else (in a three-act opera) as the final number of the second act.

The form is similar to, and may have developed from the compound binary form (ABA'B'), with an added faster coda, called a stretta (ABA'B':CC'), a variant form of the rondò found in Mozart's "Non mi dir" from Don Giovanni (1787). Another possible antecedent is a truncated variant of an ABABA refrain-form rondo, in which the final refrain is omitted and the A and B sections are given contrasting slow-fast tempos—a form favoured by the Neapolitan poet Saverio Mattei and which is found in "Non ho colpa" from Mozart's Idomeneo. The repetitions of themes within each section was an invitation for the singer to add virtuoso embellishments upon its return.

== Content ==
The metre of a rondò is almost always duple, and usually both sections are cast in the rhythms of a gavotte. The keys of A major and F major (the tonalities of Mozart’s rondòs for Sesto and Vitellia in La clemenza di Tito), appear to have been favoured for this form.

== Text ==
Rondò texts usually employ an elevated rhetorical style and are almost always either laments of unhappy lovers or conventional calls to love. As a result, they are rather generalised and conventional in expression, detached and distant emotionally, so that they are easily transferable from one opera libretto to another, as happened with "Non tardar amato bene", rejected by Mozart for Le nozze di Figaro and recycled by his librettist, Lorenzo Da Ponte for another opera, Il demogorgone, ovvero il filosofo confuso, set by Vincenzo Righini.

While there are examples of two-strophe rondòs through most of its period of popularity, the poetry far more often consists of three quatrains of ottonario, with the third quatrain usually shifting mood or dramatic focus in order to justify a new musical section. The slow part of the music sets the first two quatrains in an ABA pattern. The fast music uses the final quatrain for its main theme, and repeats parts of the earlier text (most often from the second quatrain) for the contrasting material. In later examples, where the fast sections become longer and more complex, material from all three stanzas came to be used.

== Sources ==
- Heartz, Daniel (1990). Mozart's Operas. edited, with contributing essays, by Thomas Baumann. Berkeley and London: University of California Press. ISBN 9780520078727.
- Platoff, John (November 1991). "'Non tardar amato bene' Completed, but Not by Mozart"". The Musical Times. 132 (1785): 557–60. doi:10.2307/966209. JSTOR 966209.
- Sadie, Stanley; Tyrrell, John, eds. (2001). The New Grove Dictionary of Music and Musicians (2nd ed.). London: Macmillan. ISBN 9780195170672.

Footnotes
