= Ferdinand Gasse =

French violinist and composer

Ferdinand Gasse (1780—c. 1840) was a French violinist and composer.

== Life ==
Born in Naples, Gasse, who was probably related to the architect Louis-Silvestre Gasse, born eight years later in Naples, attended the violin class of Pierre Rode at the Conservatoire de Paris from 1798. He also had lessons with Rodolphe Kreutzer, the dedicatee of Beethoven's famous Kreutzer-Sonata. He also studied harmony with Charles-Simon Catel and musical composition with François-Joseph Gossec.

From 1801 Gasse was violinist at the Paris Opera. In 1805 he received the deuxième Grand Prix de Rome for his cantata Cupidon pleurant Psyché (after a text by Antoine-Vincent Arnault). During his stay in Rome he composed, among others, a double choir Te Deum and a Christe eleison, works which were applauded by Étienne-Nicolas Méhul.

From 1810 to 1812 Gasse stayed in Naples before coming to Paris, where he resumed his activity as violinist at the Grand Opéra after the interruption of his stay in Italy. In the year of his arrival, his opéra bouffe La finta Zingara was premiered here. In 1834 Gasse retired with a pension; his exact date of death is not known. In addition to several other operas, Gasse composed mainly works for the violin.

It is assumed that Gasse was the father of Edme-Hippolyte Gasse. The pupil of François-Joseph Fétis and Henri-Montan Berton taught solfège at the Conservatoire de Paris and died early on 11 January 1831.

== Selected works ==
=== Operas ===
- La Finta Zingara, 1812
- Le Voyage incognito, 1819
- L'Idiote, 1820
- Une Nuit de Gustav Wasa, 1825
- L'Ange gardien ou Soeur Marie, 1831

=== Publications ===
- Méthode de violon, 1803
- Cours de musique, 1830
