= Teatro delle Dame =

Coordinates: 41.8962584°N 12.4632232°E

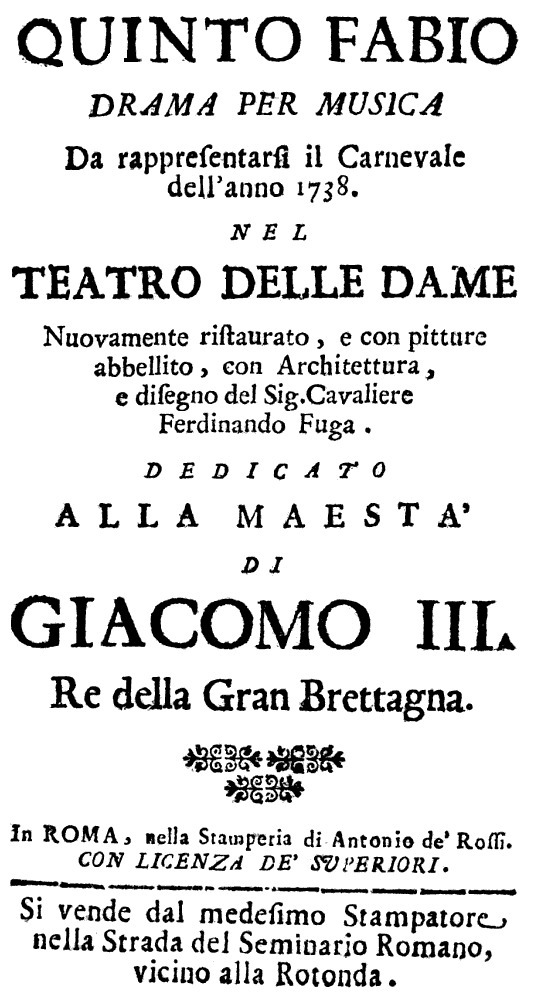
Libretto cover for Logroscino's opera Quinto Fabio, which inaugurated the renovated theatre in 1738

The Teatro delle Dame (English: Ladies' Theater), also known as the Teatro Alibert (its original name), was a theatre in Rome built in 1718 and located on what is now the corner of Via D'Alibert and Via Margutta. In the course of its history it underwent a series of reconstructions and renovations until it was definitively destroyed by a fire in 1863. In their 18th-century heyday, the Teatro delle Dame and its rival, the Teatro Capranica, were the leading opera houses in Rome and saw many world premieres performed by some of the most prominent singers of the time.

== History ==
The theatre was built by Antonio D'Alibert for the performance of opera seria. It was a project long planned by his father Jacques D'Alibert (1626–1713) who had been the secretary to Queen Christina of Sweden and had managed the Teatro Tordinona. The Teatro Tordinona was Rome's first public theatre but was demolished in 1697 on the orders of Pope Innocent XII who considered public theatres a corrupting influence on the populace.

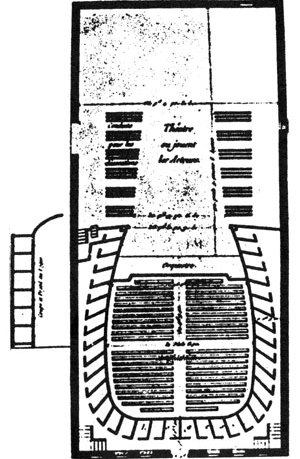
Floor plan of the theatre in 1761

The Teatro Alibert (as it was then called) was constructed in wood on a piece of land formerly used for playing pallacorda (a game similar to real tennis). According to the Italian theatre historian Saverio Franchi, the architect supervising the construction was probably Matteo Sassi (1646–1723). When it was inaugurated in 1718 with the premiere of Francesco Mancini's opera Alessandro Severo, the Teatro Alibert was the largest theatre in Rome with seven tiers of 32 boxes each. In 1720 Francesco Galli Bibiena enlarged and redesigned the interior, reshaping the auditorium into a "phonetic curve" (midway between a rectangle and a horseshoe).

The theatre was an artistic success but not a financial one. Matters were not helped by the Jubilee Year of 1725 when all Roman theatres were closed for the duration. Antonio D'Alibert went bankrupt and the Roman authorities put the theatre up for auction in 1726. It was bought by a consortium of Roman nobility and renamed the Teatro delle Dame. The theatre's management eventually passed to the Knights of Malta, with whom some members of the consortium had close links. The order was to maintain control of the theatre until well into the 19th century. In the mid-1730s, the building underwent extensive renovation and embellishment designed by the architect Ferdinando Fuga and reopened in 1738 with a performance of Nicola Logroscino's opera Quinto Fabio.

By the 19th century, the Teatro delle Dame (like its rival the Teatro Capranica) had ceased being a leading opera house in the city. Operas were still performed there, but it was increasingly used for public balls, acrobatic shows, and plays written in the local Roman dialect. Prince Alessandro Torlonia acquired the theatre in 1847 and had it reconstructed in brick with an even larger stage which could accommodate equestrian shows. On the night of 15 February 1863, the theatre caught fire yet again and was completely destroyed. Later, an inn known as the Locanda Alibert was constructed on the site. In the early 2000s the Locanda Alibert building was completely restructured and turned into a congress and event centre.

== Opera premieres ==
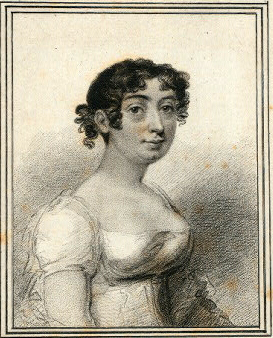
Teresa Bertinotti, the first woman to sing at the Teatro delle Dame

Throughout most of the 18th century, women were forbidden to perform on stage in the Papal States. During that period operas were sung at the Teatro delle Dame by all-male casts with castrati singing the female roles. Amongst the famous castrato singers to appear there were Farinelli, Giacinto Fontana ("Farfallino"), Giovanni Carestini, and Luigi Marchesi. From 1798 when Rome came under French rule, women began appearing on the theatre's stage—the first one was the soprano Teresa Bertinotti.

Operas which received their world premieres at the theatre include:

- Artaserse, composed by Leonardo Vinci (1730)
- La buona figliuola, composed by Niccolò Piccinni (1760)
- La vera costanza, composed by Pasquale Anfossi (1776)
- Il curioso indiscreto, composed by Pasquale Anfossi (1777)
- Antigono, composed by Josef Mysliveček (1780)
