= Lorenza Correa =

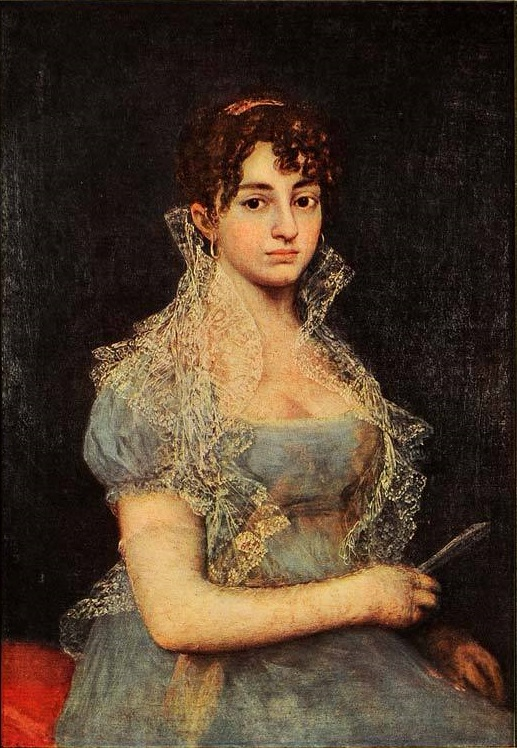
- Portrait of Lorenza Correa (1803) by Goya
- Born: 1773; Málaga, Andalucía, Spain
- Died: 1831 (aged 57–58)
- Occupations: Stage actress and opera singer

Lorenza Correa (1773–1831) was a Spanish stage actress and opera singer. She had a successful national and international career in Spain, France, and Italy from 1790 to 1810, which made her famous in her time.

She was born in 1773 in Málaga.

In 1786, she began to work in Barcelona, and in the next year, she was the eleventh lady in the company of Martínez. She was engaged by the company of Martínez at the two Royal Theatres in Madrid, Teatro de la Cruz and Teatro del Príncipe, between 1787 and 1804. In 1788, she stood out as singer. She participated in a number of important productions.

In 1804, she left Spain after a conflict with the royal theatre directory and left for Paris, where she had great success. She spent the rest of her career successfully touring in the cities of Italy, particularly in Milan.

Her death date is uncertain.

== Bibliography ==
- Gómez García, Manuel (2 January 1998). Diccionario Akal de Teatro. Ediciones Akal. p. 908. ISBN 9788446008279.
