= Giuseppe Petrosellini =

- Born: 29 November 1727; Corneto, Papal States
- Died: 1799 (aged 71–72); Rome, Papal States
- Occupation: Poet
- Writing career
- Pen name: Enisildo Prosindio
- Language: Italian

Giuseppe Petrosellini (29 November 1727 – 1799) was an Italian poet and prolific librettist working primarily in the dramma giocoso and opera buffa genres.

== Life and career ==
Petrosellini was born in Corneto, Papal State (now Tarquinia, Lazio) and spent most of life in Rome at the Papal Court where he held the title of "Abate". He was also a member of several accademie (learned societies), most notably the Accademia degli Arcadi for whom he wrote under the pseudonym "Enisildo Prosindio". Amongst his most well-known libretti is Paisiello's Il barbiere di Siviglia. La finta giardiniera, set by Pasquale Anfossi in 1774 and Wolfgang Amadeus Mozart in 1775, has been ascribed to him, but it is questionable whether it is in his style. He also wrote several libretti for Domenico Cimarosa and Pasquale Anfossi. One of his last works was the libretto for Cimarosa's I nemici generosi which premiered at the Teatro Valle in 1795. Petrosellini died in Rome in 1799.
