= Dramma giocoso =

Genre of opera ("drama with jokes")

Dramma giocoso (Italian, literally: drama with jokes; plural: drammi giocosi) is a genre of opera common in the mid-18th century. The term is a contraction of dramma giocoso per musica and describes the opera's libretto (text). The genre developed in the Neapolitan opera tradition, mainly through the work of the playwright Carlo Goldoni in Venice. A dramma giocoso characteristically used a grand buffo (comic or farce) scene as a dramatic climax at the end of an act. Goldoni's texts always consisted of two long acts with extended finales, followed by a short third act. Composers Baldassare Galuppi, Niccolò Piccinni, and Joseph Haydn set Goldoni's texts to music.

The only operas of this genre that are still frequently staged are Mozart and Da Ponte's Don Giovanni (1787) and Così fan tutte (1790).

== See also ==
- Opera semiseria
