= Pasquale Anfossi =

Italian opera composer (1727–1797)

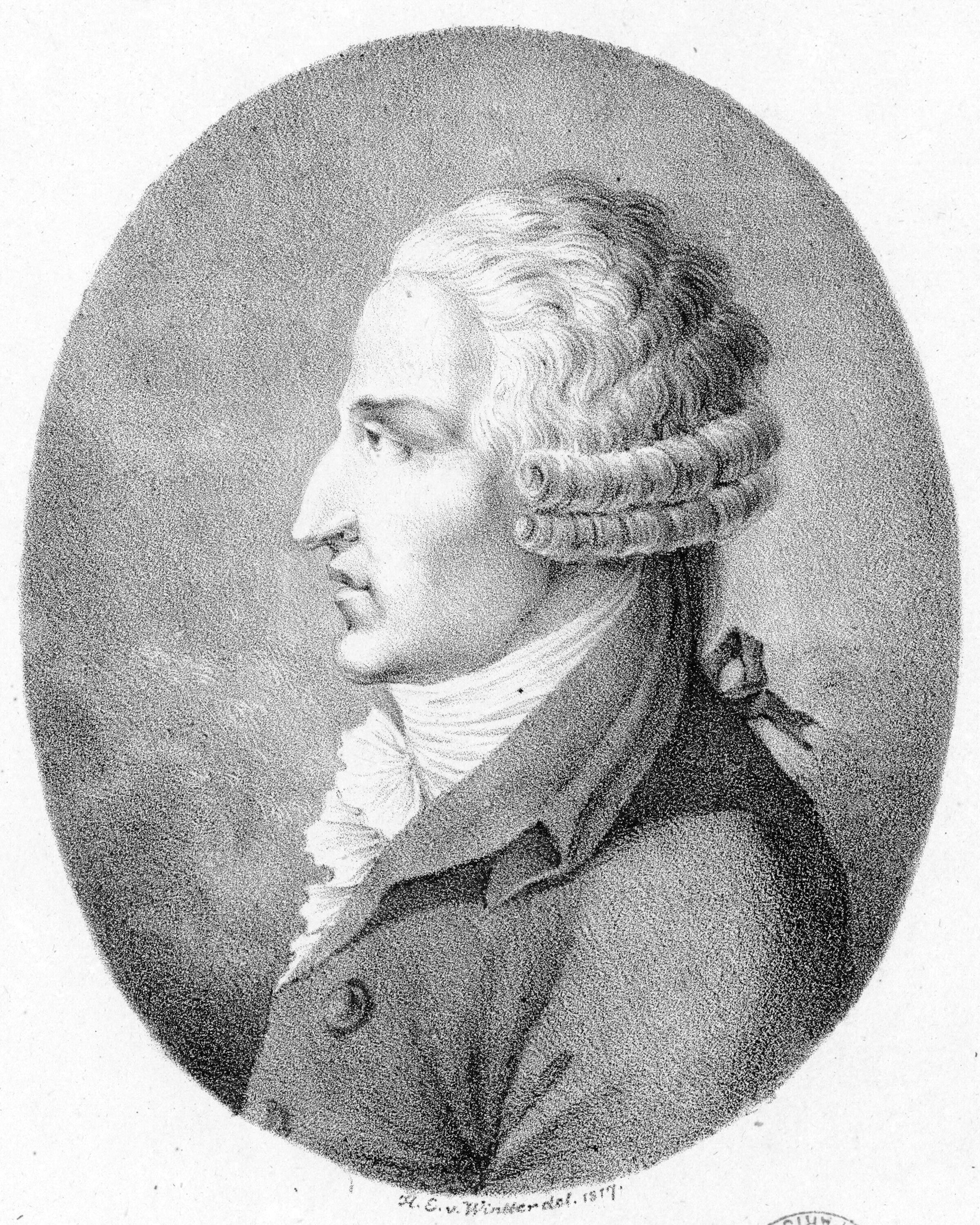
Imaginary portrait of Anfossi (1817)

Pasquale Anfossi (5 April 1727 – February 1797) was an Italian opera composer. Born in Taggia, Republic of Genoa, he studied with Niccolò Piccinni and Antonio Sacchini, and worked mainly in London, Venice and Rome.

He wrote more than 80 operas, both opera seria and opera buffa, although he concentrated on church music, especially oratorios, during his last years. Anfossi died in Rome in 1797.

== Career ==
Aiming at first to become a performer, he studied violin at the Neapolitan Loreto Conservatorium from 1744 to 1752, and played in an opera orchestra for ten years. He then turned to composing, studying with Sacchini and Piccinni. The first performance of his own work, the opera buffa La Serva Spiritosa was at the Rome Carnival in 1763, though his authorship of the work was not clearly established at the time. It appears he preferred to work under his teacher Sacchini, supplementing his tutor's works. Nevertheless, he made a breakthrough with his dramma giocoso L'incognita perseguitata in 1773 in Rome.

By 1782 he had written about 30 operas, performed mainly in Venice and Rome, although on occasion also in other parts of Italy and in Vienna. His first London performance was Il trionfo della costanza in 1782. He was engaged as musical director in London until 1786, where he performed five of his own operas and alternative versions of work by other composers; for example, Gluck's Orfeo ed Euridice with supplementary music by Johann Christian Bach and Händel. His works were not always well received: one critic wrote "the music suffers obviously from a tiring monotony" about his last opera in London, L'inglese in Italia.

Anfossi returned to Italy, and won back Roman public opinion in 1787 with the farsa Le pazzie de' gelosi at the Carnival. In 1789, the uninterrupted 20-year stretch of operatic composition stopped, and Anfossi restricted himself to church music. He was appointed Maestro di Capella of San Giovanni in Laterano, and held this position till his death in 1797.

== Works ==
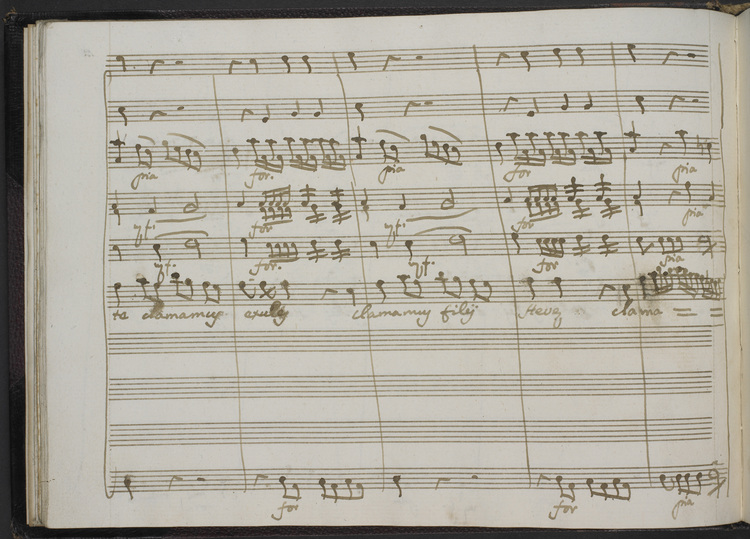
A folio from Salve regina by Anfossi, written in his own hand.

The sum of Anfossi's work is not completely known, but he composed at least 60, possibly 70 or more, operas, and at least 20 oratorios in Latin and Italian. His early work is, understandably, closely related in style to that of his teachers, Piccinni and Sacchini, with diatonic harmony and intermittently inspired melody. His orchestration style changed significantly during the course of his career; he realised more colourful effects through the use of wind instruments. Until the middle of the 1770s his opera buffa showed him to prefer the old-fashioned, pure da capo type of aria, in order to, as in his comic works, proceed to more freely shaped passages. He appeared to prefer longer passages such as finali, and he clearly had a preference for sentimental moments and phrases.

Anfossi's music was fundamentally criticised as inadequately dramatic, and weak in characterisation. His buffo characters are generally not as original as those of some of his contemporaries, such as Cimarosa and Paisiello, while his seria music has a certain stereotypical nature.

As an operatic composer, Anfossi remained forgotten for a long time, despite his great popularity with his contemporaries, because his works were overshadowed by those of Salieri, Rossini and Mozart. Nevertheless, Johann Wolfgang von Goethe staged Anfossi's farsetta La maga Circe (Circe, the Sorceress) in his role as the theatre director of Weimar. He adapted the libretto with Christian August Vulpius and also made plans for a continuation, which never came to bear.

Only in the last 20 years has Anfossi's work been appreciated anew, through diverse productions such as Giuseppe riconosciuto. His work was featured at the 2005 Salzburg Summer Festival.

=== Operas ===
See List of operas by Pasquale Anfossi.

=== Cantatas ===
- I dioscuri (libretto by Saverio Mattei, 1771, Naples)
- L'armonia (libretto by Mattia Butturini, 1790, Venice)

=== Oratorios ===
- La madre dei Maccabei (libretto by Giuseppe Barbieri, 1765, Rome)
- Noe sacrificium (1769, Venice or Florence)
- Carmina sacra camenda in nosocomio pauperum derelictorum (1773, Venice)
- Jerusalem eversa (1774, Venice)
- David contra Philisthaeos (1775, Venice)
- Giuseppe riconosciuto (libretto by Pietro Metastasio, 1776, Rome)
- Carmina sacra recinenda a piis virginibus (1776, Venice)
- Samuelis umbra (1777, Venice)
- Virginis assumptae triumphus (1780, Venice)
- La nascita del Redentore (libretto by Giacomo Gregorio, 1780, Rome)
- Esther (1781, Venice)
- La Betulia liberata (libretto by Metastasio, 1781)
- Sedecias (1782, Venice)
- Il sacrificio di Noè uscito dall'arca (1783, Rome)
- Prodigus (1786, Venice)
- Sant'Elena al Calvario (libretto by Metastasio, 1786, Rome)
- Ninive conversa (1787, Venice)
- Il figliuol prodigo (libretto by Carlo Antonio Femi, 1792, Rome)
- La morte di San Filippo Neri (libretto by Carlo Antonio Femi, 1796, Rome)
- Gerico distrutta
- Il convito di Baldassare
- Per la nascita di Nostre Signore Gesù Cristo

== Sources ==
- The Oxford Dictionary of Opera, by John Warrack and Ewan West (1992), 782 pages, ISBN 0-19-869164-5
- Giovanni Tribuzio, Pasquale Anfossi, operista alla moda, in Il secolo d'oro della musica a Napoli. Per un canone della Scuola musicale napoletana del '700, vol. II, a cura di Lorenzo Fiorito, Frattamaggiore, Diana Edizioni, 2019, pp. 133–148.
