= Chimène =

French-language opera

- Tragédie lyrique by Antonio Sacchini
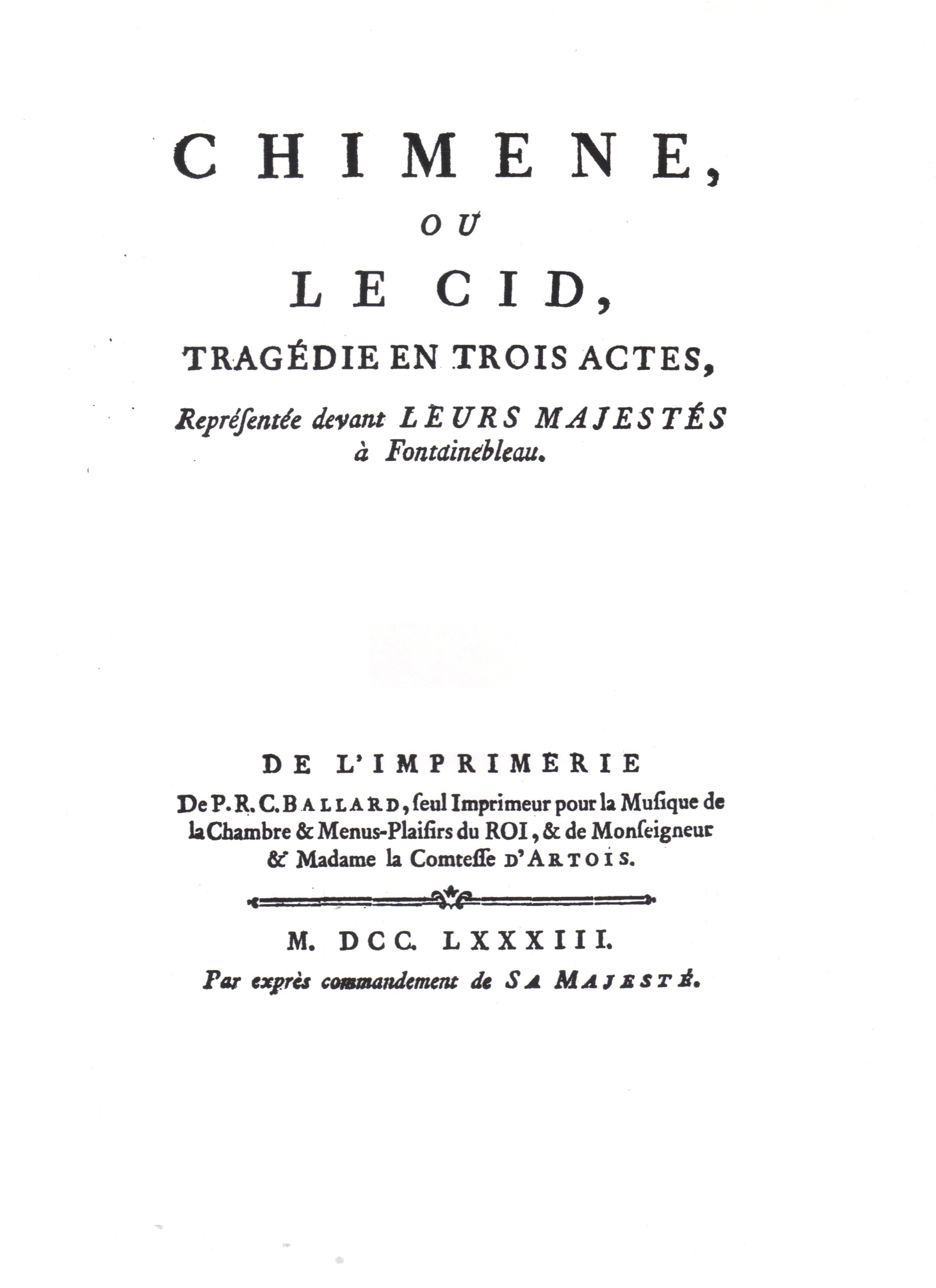
- Title page of the original libretto

Chimène, ou Le Cid is a French-language opera by Antonio Sacchini. It takes the form of a tragédie (lyrique) in three acts, with a libretto by Nicolas-François Guillard. It was first staged at Fontainebleau on 16 November 1783. The subject of the work was inspired by the tragicomedy Le Cid by Pierre Corneille, and indirectly by the medieval Spanish epic Cantar de Mio Cid and a play by Guillén de Castro y Bellvís, Las Mocedades del Cid. Comedia Comedia primera and segunda (also known as Las Hazañas del Cid) (1605–1615).

== Background ==
=== Antecedents ===
Sacchini had already dealt with the subject of El Cid twice before. The first occasion was in Rome during the Carnival season of 1769, when, under the title of Il Cidde, he had set a libretto by Gioacchino Pizzi, previously used by Niccolò Piccinni, which retained its popularity for at least another decade. The star of the work was the soprano castrato, Tommaso Guarducci, then at the height of his fame. After he moved to London, Sacchini returned to the subject for his English debut (Il Cid, 1773), using a reworking of Pizzi's libretto made by Giovanni Gualberto Bottarelli, the official poet of the King's Theatre. Il Cid included spectacular new scenes, including "a triumphal march, choruses and ballets, designed to maintain the interest of a public that knew little Italian." The leading role was sung by another of the great castrati of the time, Giuseppe Millico, who, on his return in Italy, sponsored a second setting of the same libretto, by Giovanni Paisiello, in Florence in 1775.

Sacchini moved from London to Paris in 1781, and made his debut at the Opéra in January 1783 with Renaud. For his second French opera, he decided to return to the subject of the Cid, this time with a new libretto, entitled Chimène, prepared for him by the man who was to become his favourite poet in Paris, Nicolas-François Guillard. Dennis Libby comments: "As might be expected, this libretto has the closest resemblance to Corneille's tragedy, while accommodating the French taste for choral singing and ballet". According to Lajarte, "Chimène was, to be precise, a translation and not a new work", while Pitou writes that "it had been staged in Rome and London before its Paris premiere". In fact, the case of Chimène bears strong similarities to that of Renaud, compared to Sacchini's previous Italian operas on the same theme, Armida (Milan and Florence, 1772) and Rinaldo (London, 1780). Dennis Libby writes: "Notwithstanding frequent assertions to the effect that the French opera is based on music from the London one, there appear to be no musical interrelationships of any substance among Sacchini's three Cid operas, although since the London one does not survive complete (unusually extensive excerpts were published) this cannot be asserted with absolute certainty."

=== Rivalry with Piccinni ===
The composition of Sacchini's second work for Paris must be placed in the context of the factional fighting which then dominated the French musical world, a sort of reprise of the Querelle des Bouffons a couple of decades earlier. Hostilities began in the mid-1770s: the Italophile opponents of the German composer Gluck had managed to attract Piccinni, one of the leading exponents of the Neapolitan school, to Paris. Piccinni was more or less the same age as Sacchini and, indeed, had been his fellow student and maybe even collaborator early in his career. The battle between the two camps, the "Gluckists" and the "Piccinnists" continued until 1779, when Gluck, confronted with the failure of his final opera Echo et Narcisse, had decided to return to Vienna for a while, after which hostilities had continued to smoulder under the surface. Sacchini's arrival in Paris in 1781 had been supported by Piccinni himself, who saw him as a natural ally, but the vacuum created by Gluck's absence, the intrigues of Piccinni's enemies, and Sacchini's touchiness and need for money had ended by making rivals of the two Italian composers, and a third musical faction emerged on the Parisian scene: the "Sacchinists", "a sort of moderate Gluckists, who, as [the writer on music] Grimm wittily remarked, had only joined the new sect out of jealousy towards Piccinni. With his indecisiveness and weakness, Sacchini only succeeded in setting himself against both factions, without endearing himself to either; and when it came to a fight, he found both of them against him."

== Performance history ==
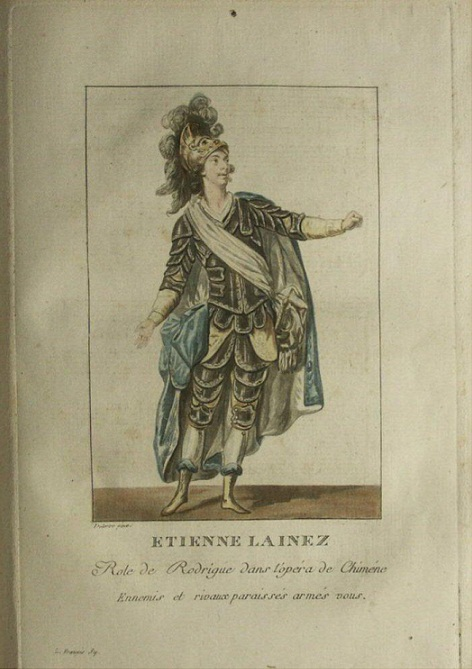
Étienne Lainez as Rodrigue

=== Premiere at Fontainebleau ===
The Académie Royale (the Paris Opéra) and the Comédie-Italienne had been ordered to organise a joint opera season for the court in the autumn of 1783 at the palace of Fontainebleau. A new work by Piccinni, Didon, had long been in preparation. Sacchini was persuaded to hurry the composition of the second of the three works stipulated in his contract with the Opéra. As mentioned above, he chose to take his subject from Corneille's tragedy Le Cid. The two new operas were placed in direct competition: Didon was to be performed on 16 October and Chimene on 16 November 1783. To level the playing field, the new prima donna of the Opéra, Antoinette Saint-Huberty, was to take the title role in both works and both pieces were due to have two performances each. Didon, probably Piccinni's masterpiece in the field of serious opera, enjoyed a triumphant reception, while Chimène was more of a succès d'éstime and was performed only once, because the "king himself, although he was no music lover, chose to hear Didon a third time. 'I think this opera', he said, 'is as good as a beautiful tragedy.'" Nevertheless, both Piccinni and Sacchini were "presented to the king, and, as he had just granted a pension of six thousand livres to the former, the latter was given the same sum; unlike his rival, Sacchini also had the precious honour of being presented to the king by the queen herself."

=== Paris performances ===
However, the Parisian public did not always agree with the opinion of the court, and many hoped Sacchini's work would be rescued by subsequent performances at the Opéra, then housed in the Salle du Théâtre de la Porte Saint-Martin. Indeed, the prima donna Saint-Huberty herself had declared she had been "ravished" by the "enchanting" music. Yet the opera was not fully redeemed, and this cannot wholly be blamed on the specious difficulties created by the committee of the Académie Royale, which postponed performances until 9 February 1784 (in the meantime, Didon had been appearing regularly since 1 December and Saint-Huberty was "crowned" on stage on 16 January). Nor can it be blamed on the leading lady's health problems, which forced the run of performances to be interrupted until 27 February, when the Queen herself came to see it.

The opera certainly enjoyed a limited long-term success: it was given 21 times in 1784 and another 35 times before it was withdrawn from the repertoire for good in 1808. On the other hand, Didon survived much longer, until 1826, enjoying a grand total of 250 performances. Didon has also been revived on stage in modern times and received a CD recording, which has not been the case with Chimène.

=== Modern revivals ===
Chimène was revived in 2017 for a series of performances beginning at the Théâtre de Saint-Quentin-en-Yvelines on 13 January 2017 with Le Concert de la Loge orchestra conducted by Julien Chauvin. Agnieszka Sławinska sang the title role and Artavazd Sargsyan played Rodrigue.

== Roles ==
Role	Voice type	Premiere cast, 16 November 1783 in the presence of the King and Queen of France, Louis XVI and Marie Antoinette Choreography: Pierre Gabriel Gardel
Le roi (The King of Castile)	taille/baritone	François Lays (or Laïs or Lay)
Chimène (Jimena, in love with Rodrigo, even though he has killed her father in a duel)	soprano	Antoinette-Cécile Saint-Huberty
Rodrigue (Rodrigo, "El Cid", a Castilian warrior, in love with Chimène)	haute-contre	Étienne Lainez (or Lainé)
Don Diègue (Don Diego, father of Rodrigo)	bass	Auguste-Athanase (Augustin) Chéron
Don Sanche (Don Sancho, a nobleman, the champion of Chimène)	tenor	Jean-Joseph Rousseau
Un hérault d'armes (Herald)	bass	Jean-Pierre Moreau
Une coryphée	soprano	Anne-Marie-Jeanne Gavaudan l'aînée
Elvire (Elvira, confidante of Chimène)	soprano	Suzanne Joinville
Une femme de la suite de Chimène (a lady companion of Chimène)	soprano	Adélaïde Gavaudan cadette
Un chevalier (a knight)	tenor	Dufrenaye (or Dufresnay)
Un officier castillan (a Castilian officer)	tenor	Martin
Un coryphée	baritone	Louis-Claude-Armand Chardin ("Chardiny")
Chorus; Ballet – ballerinas: Marie-Madeleine Guimard, Peslin, Deligny, Pérignon; male dancers: Pierre Gabriel Gardel, Nivelon, Favre

== Synopsis ==
The scene is the court of Castile in the 11th century, during the first phase of the Reconquista.

=== Background ===
The libretto makes no reference to the background of the story, which can be inferred from Corneille's tragedy. The young warrior Rodrigue and the beautiful Chimène are in love with one other, but their fathers are at odds over political issues. When Chimène's father slaps Don Diegue, the latter asks his son Rodrigue to fight a duel on his behalf, as he is too old to defend his honour in person. Rodrigue is torn between the conflicting demands of love and honour, but in the end he obeys Don Diegue and fights and kills Chimene's father, much to his despair.

=== Act 1 ===
Chimène is alone in a room in the palace and is torn apart by conflicting emotions: love, desire for revenge and honour. But she vows to avenge her father (Scene 1). The king enters and tries to console Chimène, treating her as his own daughter: he declares how fond he was of her dead father, but also reveals the respect in which everyone holds Rodrigue, the one man capable of leading the fight against the Moors. Nevertheless, the king promises to capture and punish her father's killer (Scene 2). Left alone with her maids, Chimène reveals her undying love for Rodrigue. She adored him before the fatal duel, and now that fate has divided them and all hope is dead, their love still remains intact. Nevertheless, she says she will do what honour demands, and the more she loves Rodrigue, the more she will seek to punish him (Scene 3). The next scene is taken up by a dramatic duet between Chimène and Rodrigue, who has just arrived: he begs her to kill him, but she fails to follow through with her vow of revenge, and the two are left in despair (Scene 4). Alone again, Rodrigue contemplates death (Scene 5), until he is met by his father and his followers, and asked to march against the army of the Moors which has just laid siege to the city. If he is to die, he should do so nobly for his king and country. Encouraged by his father's words, Rodrigue agrees to fight and the first act ends with a martial chorus (Scene 6).

=== Act 2 ===
In the palace courtyard, the common people fear the arrival of the Moors (Scene 1), and the king tries to reassure them, inviting them to seek refuge in the palace. Suddenly, unexpected shouts of victory are heard (Scene 2). A herald enters and describes in detail the total defeat of the Moors, leading behind him a band of captive enemies, including two kings (Scene 3). When the King of Castile asks who is responsible, an officer tells him that Don Diegue wants to lead the victor into his presence in person. The king realises that it is Rodrigue, who is hailed as a saviour by everyone present (Scene 4). Rodrigue is then introduced by his father and welcomed into the arms of the king. Rodrigue says that, driven to despair by the tragedy that has divided him from Chimène, he had sought an honourable death in battle. The king tries to console him, suggesting that Chimene – who is still in love with him – might have second thoughts about her revenge, given the valour her beloved has just shown. The scene ends in choruses and dances of victory, during which Rodrigue is proclaimed "El Cid" (Scene 5). As the celebrations end, Chimène reappears. Having learned of Rodrigue's exploits, she fears she will now fail to achieve her revenge. In fact, the king wants to declare Rodrigue above the law, but the other knights are opposed, offering to take up the challenge on her behalf against the "Cid" in a trial by combat. It is also opposed by Don Diegue, who, in the name of honour, urges his son to fight for the umpteenth time. The king yields to the majority opinion and allows Chimène to accept the offer of Don Sanche, another knight who is in love with her, to represent her in combat. To Chimène's consternation, the king nevertheless sets one condition: she must accept the hand of the victor in marriage (Scene 7). The common people, left alone, sing a chorus of support for the "Cid" (Scene 8).

=== Act 3 ===
Dishevelled and restless, Chimène enters followed by Elvire and her other ladies. She is in despair about the terrible choice she has been forced to make, but she strongly believes Rodrigue can never be defeated in combat. Rodrigue arrives to say goodbye for the last time and tells her that he will never dare to raise his sword against anyone who fights in her name. He will let himself be killed, with no fear for his honour: people will only say that, conquered by Chimène, and with no hope of changing her mind, he had preferred to die rather than live with the burden of her hatred. Chimène begs Rodrigue to avoid falling prey to Don Sanche, because she cannot bear the prospect of Sanche's bloodstained hand taking hers in marriage. She urges him to remember that she will be the prize of the winner. Reassured by his beloved's words, Rodrigue leaves, declaring his desire for victory (Scene 2). Left alone with her entourage, while the trumpets announcing the duel are heard in the distance, Chimène performs a "mad scene", in which she believes she is seeing the events of the fight, and faints in the arms of her ladies as she imagines Rodrigue mortally wounded (Scene 3). Don Sanche enters bearing Rodrigue's sword, but he is prevented from speaking by the curses of Chimène, who calls him a hateful murderer (Scene 4). The king appears with his entourage and Chimène throws herself at his feet, confessing her unchanging love for the slain Rodrigue, and begging him to spare her the shame of having to marry the man who is guilty of his death. But the king is adamant and declares that any resistance on the part of the girl is in vain, inviting her to willingly accept the groom he will give her today (Scene 5). Rodrigue then enters: he had defeated Don Sanche, but he had spared his life, sending him instead to offer Chimène the conqueror's sword, and he now asks her to accept him as husband of her own free will, and not by right of conquest. Chimène, finally won over, surrenders to her love and the work ends with the customary final divertissement, with songs and dances in honour of the conqueror of the Moors and his bride (Scene 6).

== Sources ==
=== Bibliography ===
- Jullien, Adolphe (1878). La Cour et l'Opéra sous Louis XVI. Marie-Antoinette et Sacchini Salieri Favart et Gluck. D'après des documents inédits conservés aux Archives de l'État et à l'Opéra (in French). Paris: Librairie Académique (Didier). OL 14017446M. (accessible online at Gallica - B.N.F.)
- (in French) Théodore de Lajarte, Bibliothèque Musicale du Théatre de l'Opéra. Catalogue Historique, Chronologique, Anecdotique, Paris, Librairie des bibliophiles, 1878, Tome I, ad nomen, pp. 340–341 (accessible online at Internet Archive)
- Dennis Libby, Cid, El and Cidde, Il, in Stanley Sadie (ed.), op. cit., I, pp. 862–863
- Spire Pitou, The Paris Opéra. An Encyclopedia of Operas, Ballets, Composers, and Performers – Rococo and Romantic, 1715–1815, Westport/London, Greenwood Press, 1985. ISBN 0-313-24394-8
- Stanley Sadie (ed.), The New Grove Dictionary of Opera, New York, Grove (Oxford University Press), 1997. ISBN 978-0-19-522186-2

=== Online sources ===
- Chimène, ou Le Cid, tragédie en trois actes, Représentée devant Leurs Majestés à Fontainebleau, Paris, Ballard, 1783 (libretto)
- Youri Carbonnier, "Le personnel musical de l'Opéra de Paris sous le règne de Louis XVI", Histoire, Économie et Société, 2003, vol. 22, no. 2, pp. 177–206
- Casaglia, Gherardo (2005). "Chimène". L'Almanacco di Gherardo Casaglia (in Italian).
- Italianopera
