= Antonia Bernasconi =

German operatic soprano

Antonia Bernasconi (born Antonia Wagele, 18 January 1741 – 1803) was a German operatic soprano, originally from the Holy Roman Empire. She appeared in opera houses in Vienna, Milan, Venice, Naples and London.

== Life ==
Antonia Wagele was born in Stuttgart on 18 January 1741. Her father was a valet de chambre of the Prince of Württemberg, and after his death Antonia's mother married a second time to the composer Andrea Bernasconi in Parma in 1747. Antonia took her step-father's surname at this time, and it is from him that she received training as a singer. Andrea was the maestro di cappella of the Ospedale della Pietà in Venice from 1744 until 1753 when he was appointed assistant Kapellmeister of vocal music of the court in Munich. Not long after he was appointed music teacher of princesses Maria Anna Josepha of Bavaria and Maria Josepha of Bavaria. He also gave music lessons to Maximilian III Joseph, and was later promoted to the post of Kapellmeister at the Munch court on 7 September 1755.

Antonia Bernasconi made her professional debut as Aspasia in the premiere of her step-father's opera Temistocle which was given its debut in Munich on 21 January 1762. In her early career she mainly performed in comedic roles; including performances in Vienna in the opera buffas La buona figliuola by Niccolò Piccinni and La contadina in corte by Antonio Sacchini in the 1765-1766 season. On December 26, 1767 she sang the title role in the world premiere of Christoph Willibald Gluck's Alceste at the Burgtheater in Vienna. Gluck created the part expressly for her.

On December 26, 1770, at the Teatro Regio Ducale in Milan,Bernasconi took the part of Aspasia in the premiere of Mozart's early opera Mitridate, re di Ponto. She distrusted the powers of the boy, aged fourteen, to compose the arias for her, and requested to see what she was to sing, to which he acceded. She tried a piece, and was charmed with it. Mozart then, piqued at her want of confidence, gave her another, and a third, leaving Bernasconi quite confounded with so rare a talent and so rich an imagination at years so tender. Shortly afterwards Quirino Gasparini called on her with the words of the libretto set to different music, and endeavoured to persuade her not to sing the music of the young Mozart. She refused, being quite overjoyed at the arias Mozart had written for her. The opera had a prodigious success.

She was in Venice at the Teatro San Benedetto in 1771–72, and in Naples at the Teatro di San Carlo in 1772–73. In 1778 she went to London, and appeared with Gaspare Pacchierotti in Demofonte, a pasticcio, at the Haymarket Theatre. She remained in London until 1780, in opera seria roles in the 1778–79 season and in opera buffa roles in 1779–1780. Julian Marshall wrote: "She was then a good musician, and a correct and skilful singer; but her voice was not powerful, and she was past her prime."

Bernasconi settled in Vienna; in 1781 she was in Alceste and Iphigénie en Tauride of Gluck, and a comic opera La contadina in corte by Antonio Sacchini, which she had sung with success in London. She died in Vienna in 1803.
