= Joseph Legros =

French opera singer (1739–1793)

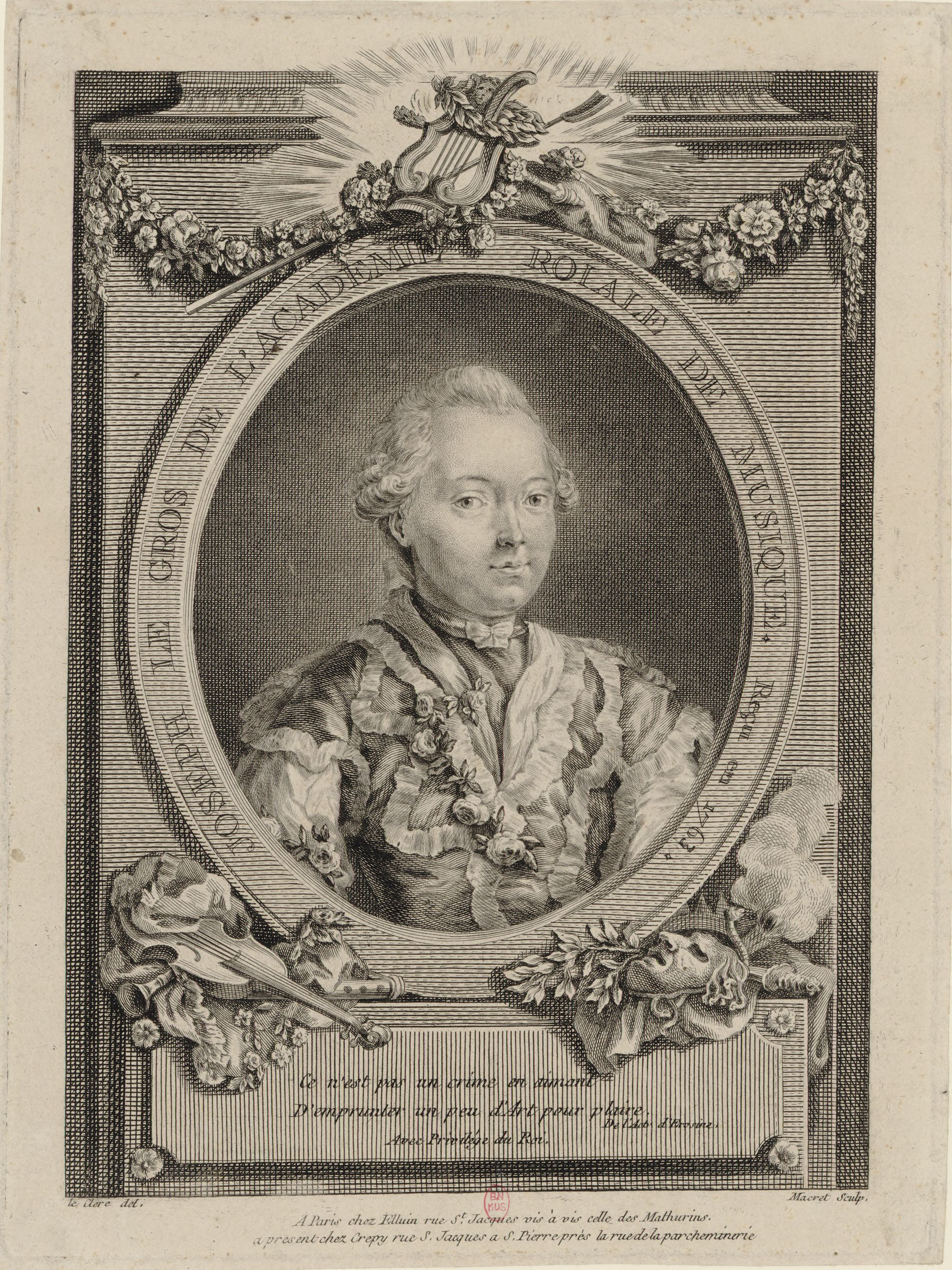
Joseph Legros

Joseph Legros, often also spelt Le Gros, (7 September or 8 September 1739 – 20 December 1793) was a French singer, impresario and composer of the 18th century. He is usually regarded as the most prominent haute-contre of his generation, though his acting is reputed to have been mediocre. He is best remembered for his association with the composers Gluck and Mozart.

== Biography ==
Legros was born at Monampteuil, Laon. After initial training as a choirboy, when his voice broke Legros developed the voice of an haute-contre, a type of French high tenor that was typically used for the heroic male lead in French operas of the period. Legros made his début at the Paris Opéra in 1764 in a revival of Mondonville's Titon et l'Aurore and became the leading haute-contre at the Opéra, a status he held until his retirement in 1783, caused in part by his increasing obesity.

Legros began his operatic career singing the principal roles in revivals of the operas by Jean-Baptiste Lully and Jean-Philippe Rameau, and in the new works by their late followers. When in 1774, a foreign composer, Christoph Willibald Gluck, was for the first time invited to work for the Académie Royale de Musique, Legros had to confront the new composer's ground-breaking performing style. Although the singer "had an unusually brilliant and flexible upper register, particularly from top F to B flat", Gluck did not like either his expression or his acting ability, but he was obligated to entrust the company's principal tenor with the amatory leads in the operas he was going to produce. Accordingly, in 1774 Legros was charged with the roles of Achilles in Iphigénie en Aulide and, more important, Orphée in the new French version of Orfeo ed Euridice. In revising the latter opera, Gluck adapted for high tenor the male title role, originally intended for the alto castrato Gaetano Guadagni.

Gluck exploited the upper range throughout the opera, so that the role lies consistently about a third higher than the conventional tenor register. He transposed the duet in Act III from G to F solely to display Le Gros' ringing top Cs; and top Ds occur in Act II to express 'L'excès de mes malheurs' [the excess of my pains]

— Patricia Howard, From Orfeo to Orphée, in Howard 1981, p. 74

During the long rehearsal bad-tempered Gluck is reported to have sometimes been very abrupt with the singer who seemed unfit to conform to his instructions. While coaching him in the opening chorus, Gluck addressed him like this:

My good sir, it is intolerable: you always scream when you should sing, and when it is a question of screaming, you don't. Think at this moment neither of the music nor of the chorus, but scream with just as much anguish as if someone were sawing through your bone. And, if you can, realise this pain inwardly, spiritually, and as if it came from the heart.

— Johann Christian von Mannlich, Ein deutscher Maler und Hofmann. Lebenserinnerungen, Berlin, Mittler, 1910, p. 274

Nevertheless, Legros submitted himself to Gluck's rude coaching without protest and proved able to profit by it: at the premiere he turned out a quite new performer, to the Parisian musical circles' great surprise. "In considering what the role of Orpheus has done for M. Le Gros," commented Abbé Arnaud, a big fan of Gluck, "I am tempted to believe that the chevalier Gluck's music is more stirring and theatrical than that of any other composer". For his part, Friedrich Melchior von Grimm, who was no such a Gluckist supporter, wrote it was difficult not to regard the metamorphosis of Legros "as one of the most prominent miracles wrought by the enchanter Gluck". Legros acquitted himself with honour even in the Italianate virtuoso style of the arietta "L'espoir renaît dans mon âme", interpolated at the end of Act I. During the following nine years, he appeared in all the French operas by Gluck, taking the roles of Admetus in the 1776 revision of Alceste, Renaud in Armide, Pylades in Iphigénie en Tauride and Cynire in Echo et Narcisse. He also performed in four operas by Niccolò Piccinni, creating Médor in Roland, the title role in Atys, Pylades in this composer's setting of Iphigénie en Tauride, and Raimond de Mayenne in his setting of Adèle de Ponthieu. His final creation was the eponymous role in Antonio Sacchini's Renaud, which he handed over, however, after few performances.

When in 1783 Legros was finally granted permission to retire with a pension of 2,000 livres, he was a member of the committee of artistes which had been charged with the management of the Opéra since the former director Antoine Dauvergne's resignation in 1782. Denis-Pierre-Jean Papillon de la Ferté, the long-serving sole Intendant of the Menus-Plaisirs du Roi, who was ultimately in charge of the theatre, referred to Legros in commendatory terms: he was "the first singer of the Opéra" and his departure "would be a real loss for the administration". He even suggested Legros alone was qualified to fill the vacant directorship of the theatre. Papillon de la Ferté's suggestion, however, met with opposition from the rest of the committee and remained a dead letter.

From 1777 Legros directed the Concert Spirituel, where he promoted performances of the music of Haydn and Mozart. Mozart became acquainted with him during his visit to Paris in 1778, when he visited Legros frequently and used his piano for composing. Legros commissioned Mozart to write his Symphony No. 31 in D major, K. 297 and movements for a ‘Miserere’ by Holzbauer. The Mozart scholar Cliff Eisen considers it likely that Mozart also composed the lost Sinfonia concertante K297B for flute, oboe, horn and bassoon for Legros.

He collaborated with Léopold-Bastien Desormery to rewrite the second act of François Lupien Grenet's opéra-ballet Le triomphe de l'harmonie. Their work was performed at the Opéra in 1775 under the title Hylas et Eglé. During this time he also composed an unperformed opera, Anacréon, and some songs. He died at La Rochelle.

== Bibliography ==
- Howard, Patricia, ed. (1981). C. W. von Gluck: Orfeo. Cambridge: Cambridge University Press. ISBN 0-521-29664-1.
- Rushton, Julian (n.d.). "Legros, Joseph". In L. Macy (ed.). Grove Music Online.
- Sawkins, Lionel (n.d.). "Haute-contre". In L. Macy (ed.). Grove Music Online.
- Pitou, Spire (1985). The Paris Opéra. An Encyclopedia of Operas, Ballets, Composers, and Performers – Rococo and Romantic, 1715–1815. Westport/London: Greenwood Press. ISBN 0-313-24394-8.
