= Antonio Sacchini =

Italian composer (1730–1786)

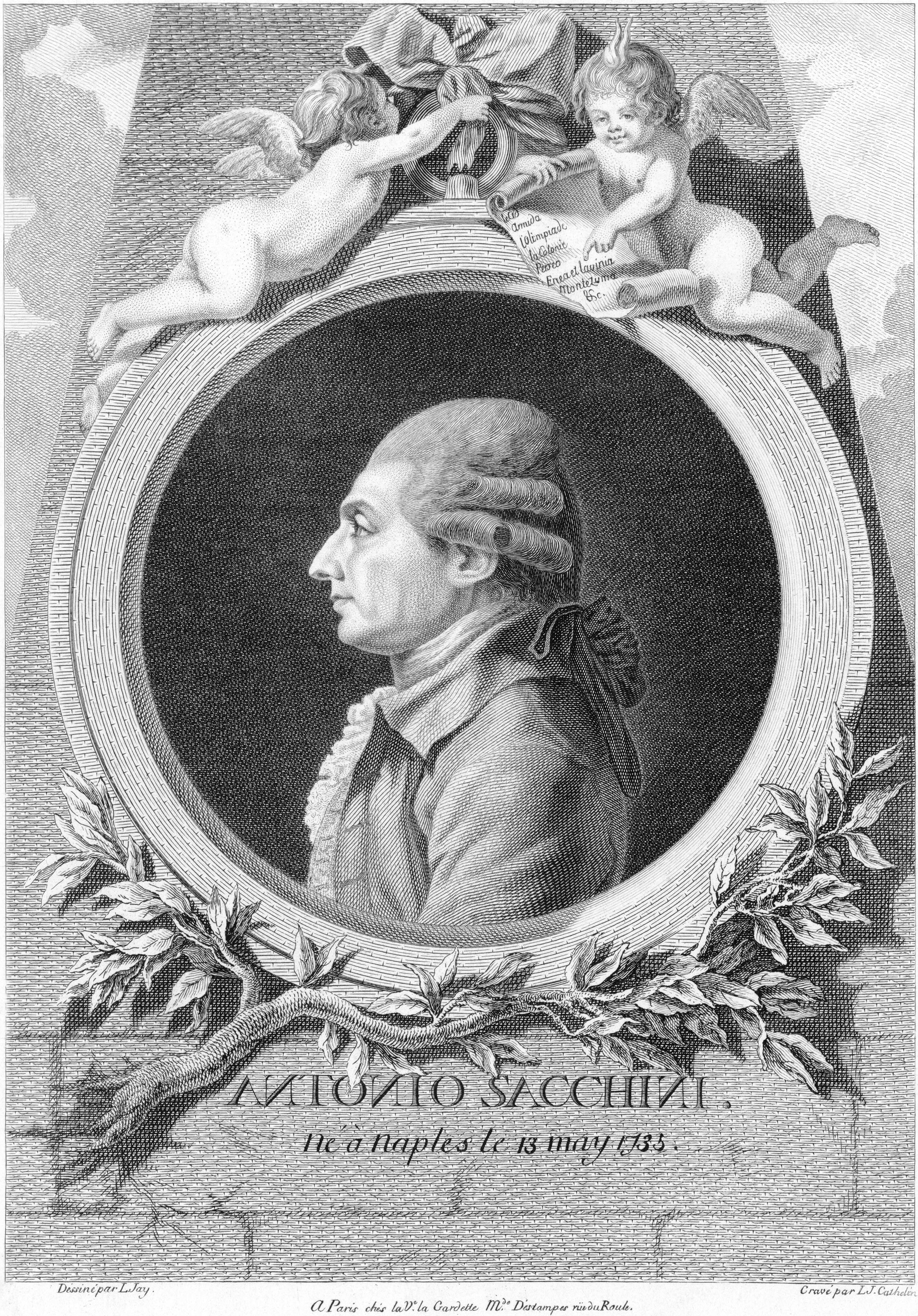
Antonio Sacchini

Antonio Maria Gasparo Gioacchino Sacchini (14 June 1730 – 6 October 1786) was an Italian classical era composer, best known for his operas.

Sacchini was born in Florence, but raised in Naples, where he received his musical education. He made a name for himself as a composer of serious and comic opera in Italy before moving to London, where he produced works for the King's Theatre. He spent his final years in Paris, becoming embroiled in the musical dispute between the followers of the composers Gluck and Niccolò Piccinni. His early death in 1786 was blamed on his disappointment over the apparent failure of his opera Œdipe à Colone. However, when the work was revived the following year, it quickly became one of the most popular in the 18th-century French repertoire.

== Life ==
=== Childhood and education ===
Sacchini was the son of a humble Florentine cook (or coachman), Gaetano Sacchini. At the age of four, he moved with his family to Naples as part of the entourage of the infante Charles of Bourbon (later to become King Charles III of Spain). The young Sacchini's talent for music caught the attention of Francesco Durante, who enrolled him in the Conservatorio di Santa Maria di Loreto at the age of ten. Here Durante and his assistant Pietrantonio Gallo taught Sacchini the basics of composition, harmony and counterpoint. Sacchini also became a skilled violinist under the tuition of Nicola Fiorenza as well as studying singing under Gennaro Manna. Sacchini was one of the favourite pupils of Durante, a hard teacher to please. It was said that Durante would point out the young Sacchini to his fellow pupils, warning them that he would be a difficult rival to beat and urging them to try to match him, otherwise Sacchini would become the "man of the century."

=== Early career in Italy ===
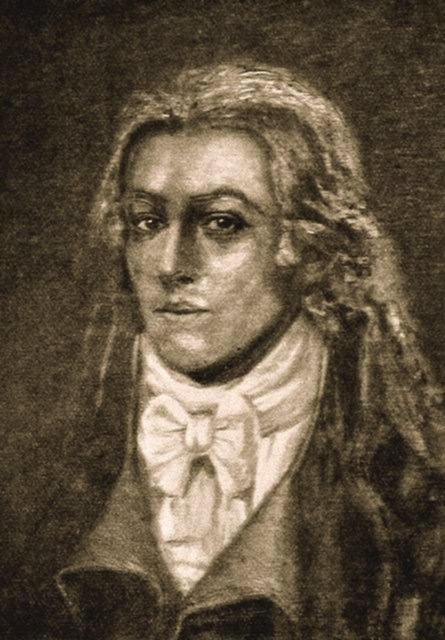
Tommaso Traetta, Sacchini's friend and fellow composer

Sacchini was 25 when Durante died in 1755. The following year, he became a "mastricello" (a junior teacher in the school) and had the opportunity to compose, as the final exercise of his studies, his first operatic work, an intermezzo in two parts entitled Fra' Donato. It was performed to great acclaim by the school's students and was followed a year later by another intermezzo, Il giocatore. The warm reception these works enjoyed paved Sacchini's way to commissions from the smaller theatres which performed opera in Neapolitan dialect. One of his major successes was the opera buffa Olimpia tradita (1758) at the Teatro dei Fiorentini, which led to commissions from the Teatro San Carlo, where his first opera seria, Andromaca, was premiered in 1761. Meanwhile, Sacchini was pursuing his career at the Conservatorio, where he had initially taken up the unpaid position of "maestro di cappella straordinario", assisting the "primo maestro", Manna, and the "secondo maestro", Gallo. When Manna retired in 1761, shortly before the premiere of Andromaca, Sacchini was promoted to "secondo maestro".

In 1762 the Conservatorio gave Sacchini permission to travel to Venice to present the operas Alessandro Severo (with a libretto by Apostolo Zeno) at the Teatro San Benedetto, and Alessandro nelle Indie (with a libretto by Metastasio) the following year at the Teatro San Salvatore. Over the next couple of years, Sacchini produced new operas for theatres across Italy: Olimpiade in Padua (Teatro Nuovo, 1763), Eumene in Florence (La Pergola, 1764), Semiramide riconosciuta in Rome (Teatro Argentina, 1764), and Lucio Vero in Naples (Teatro San Carlo, 1764). Success on an Italian-wide level encouraged Sacchini to leave his job at the Conservatorio di Santa Maria di Loreto, as well as his temporary post in Venice, and to try his luck as an independent composer.

Initially settling in Rome, Sacchini spent several years composing opere buffe for the Teatro Valle. These works made him famous throughout Europe. One of the most notable of them – it has been revived and recorded in modern times – was the two-act intermezzo La contadina in corte (1765). In 1768, Sacchini moved to Venice, having accepted the temporary post of director of the Conservatorio dell'Ospedale dei Poveri Derelitti (the "Ospedaletto"), offered by his predecessor in the job Tommaso Traetta, who had been Sacchini's friend since their studies together in Naples and who was now leaving Venice to work at the court of Saint Petersburg. In Venice, Sacchini soon made a name for himself as a singing master (his pupils included Nancy Storace and, possibly, Adriana Gabrielli, who, under the name Adriana Ferrarese del Bene was subsequently to go down in history as the first singer to play Mozart's Fiordiligi). While continuing to pursue his career as an opera composer, he also spent time writing sacred pieces (oratorios, masses, hymns, motets) for the Conservatorio and various Venetian churches, as his contract required.

Charles Burney met Sacchini in Venice in 1770. By then, Sacchini was enjoying an enormous reputation: he had just scored successes with the operas Scipione in Cartagena and Calliroe in Munich and Ludwigsburg, and he was, in the opinion of the English writer, the only composer worthy to stand alongside the "giant" Baldassare Galuppi among all the "dwarfs" who then populated the Venetian musical scene.

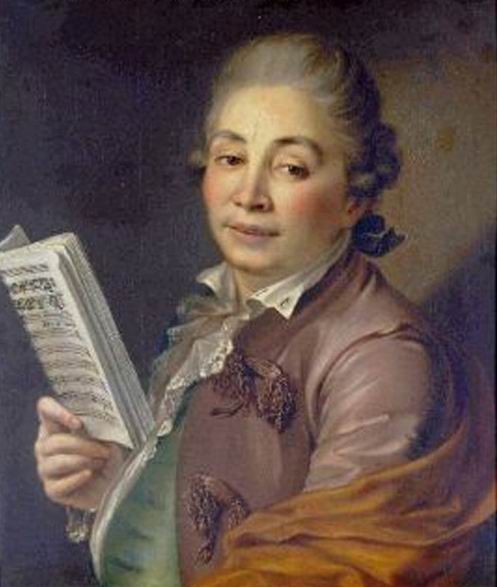
Giuseppe Millico, the famous castrato singer who accompanied Sacchini to London

=== London ===
In 1772, Sacchini moved to London, accompanied by Giuseppe Millico, one of the finest castrati then active on the European stage and Gluck's favourite. Beginning with two new operas staged at the King's Theatre in 1773, Il Cid (in January) and Tamerlano (in May), in the words of Burney, Sacchini soon "captured the hearts" of the London public. He was so popular that Tommaso Traetta was unable to make any impression with his operas when he arrived in the British capital in 1776, even though Sacchini himself had supported the move by his old friend. Sacchini remained in London for a decade, until 1782, despite the fact his enormous mounting debts created growing difficulties and even enemies. Among the latter was Venanzio Rauzzini, who had taken over from Millico as the leading male singer at the King's Theatre, and who claimed that he had written some of Sacchini's most famous arias himself. The majority of Sacchini's chamber music dates from his years in London. As far as music for the stage is concerned, new operas by Sacchini were produced every year over the whole period apart from 1776/1777, probably in connection with the composer's trips to the Continent and with the staging in Paris of French-language pasticci based on two previous works: the dramma giocoso from the Roman period, L'isola d'amore, now entitled La colonie, and the opera seria L'Olimpiade, which became L'Olympiade. The translator of the libretti into French was the musician and writer Nicolas-Étienne Framery, a lover of Italian music. At that time, the Parisian operatic scene was divided between supporters of the German composer Gluck, famous for his musical reforms, and followers of his Italian rival Niccolò Piccinni. A member of the emerging Piccinnist faction, Framery also admired Sacchini and formed a lasting friendship with him. On 8 June 1779, a work by Sacchini appeared for the first time on the stage of the Paris Opéra. It was a revival of the dramma giocoso L'amore soldato, which had premiered in England the previous year, and was now advertised as an intermède in three acts. During his stays in Paris in the seventies Sacchini is also said to have imparted the rudiments of a real singing education to the future European star of opera and refined cantatrice, Brigida Banti.

=== Paris ===
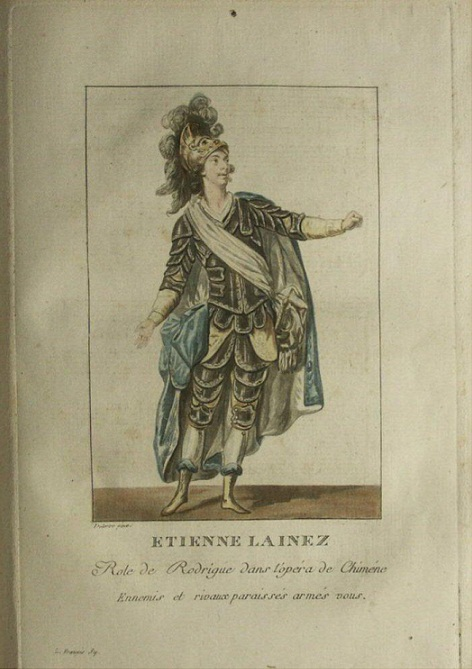
Étienne Lainez as Rodrigue in Chimène, the second work Sacchini composed for the Paris Opéra

Sacchini's position in London eventually became untenable: his health had declined and his work was no longer attracting the same success. These factors and the looming threat of debtors' prison finally induced him to accept Framery's invitation to move to Paris in 1781. Sacchini received a warm welcome in the French capital: the Piccinnists saw him as a natural ally in their battle against the influence of Gluck; but, more importantly, Emperor Joseph II happened to be in Paris at the time, travelling incognito. The emperor was a passionate devotee of Italian music, and Sacchini's in particular, and he eagerly recommended the composer to his sister Marie Antoinette, the Queen of France. The Queen's patronage paved Sacchini's way to the Opéra (she had helped Gluck in much the same fashion eight years earlier). In October, Sacchini signed a lucrative contract with the Académie Royale de Musique (the Paris Opéra) to produce three new works.

However, Sacchini immediately found himself embroiled in intrigues. Seigneur de la Ferté, the intendant of the Menus-Plaisirs du Roi, a sort of master of royal ceremonies who was also head of the Académie Royale, was opposed to the queen's predilection for foreign music. He plotted to delay the premiere of Sacchini’s first French opera, Renaud. Meanwhile, the Gluckists were manoeuvring to detach Sacchini from his Piccinnist supporters. When Renaud finally appeared on 25 February 1783, its reception was positive but not overwhelming. The libretto was a reworking, to which Framery contributed, of a libretto by Simon-Joseph Pellegrin (Renaud, ou La suite d'Armide), which had originally been set to music in 1722 by Henri Desmarets. Contrary to what has often been claimed, the Parisian Renaud was not a revised version of Sacchini's Armida of 1772, itself revised to create a new opera Rinaldo for London in 1780. Instead, Renaud was "a completely new opera, starting with the action, which begins at the point where the other two leave off; the subject of the opera was no longer the love of Armida and Rinaldo in the enchanted garden, which Armida destroys after her lover leaves her, but based on their subsequent story in Tasso's Gerusalemme liberata (with many liberties taken)." However, Renaud pleased neither party: "Piccinni's faction asserted that the score ... was influenced by Gluck, while the Gluck supporters condemned the work for lacking dramatic power and originality."

Sacchini's second opera for the Paris stage was also based on a subject the composer had treated (twice) before, the story of El Cid. The new work appeared at the court theatre under the title Chimène in November 1783, in an atmosphere of direct competition with Piccinni. Piccinni's Didon, staged at court the previous month, had been hailed as a masterpiece, enjoying a further two performances there; in comparison, Chimène made less of an impression and was only given once. However, "both composers were presented to the king (Sacchini by the queen herself) and given a large pension". In fact, despite Sacchini's arrival in Paris having been supported by Piccinni himself (he had initially seen Sacchini as an ally), the continuing absence of Gluck (which would turn out to be permanent), the intrigues of Piccinni's enemies, Sacchini's touchiness and his need for money, had inevitably ended in a rivalry between the two Italian composers, and a third musical faction had emerged on the Parisian scene: the "Sacchinists", a "sort of moderate Gluckists, who, as [the writer on music] Grimm wittily observed, had adhered to the new sect solely because of their jealousy towards Piccinni. With his indecisiveness and weakness, Sacchini only succeeded in setting himself against both factions, without endearing himself to either; and when it came to a fight, he found both of them against him."

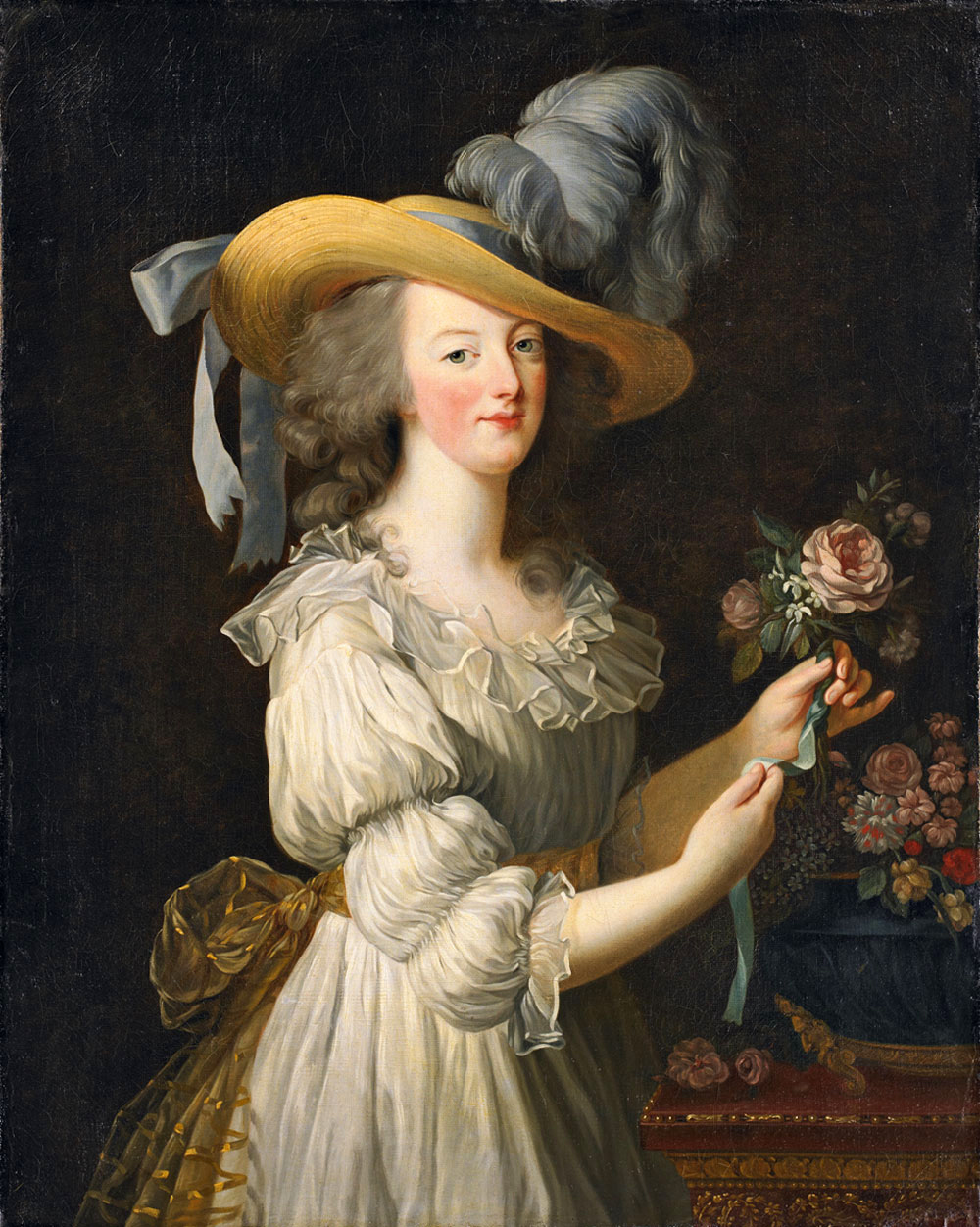
A portrait of Marie Antoinette in 1783 by Élisabeth Vigée-Lebrun

Sacchini's first two Parisian operas had been praised for their Italianate charm, but criticised for a certain dramatic weakness, also deriving from the Italian style. With his next operas, Sacchini "attempted to create works that conformed to the ideals of French musical drama." Dardanus, with a libretto which was largely a reworking of Jean-Philippe Rameau's opera of the same name, provoked mixed reactions and appeared in two different versions in the first year of its life on stage. His next opera, Œdipe à Colone, was to have a far more dramatic impact on the life of the composer. Sacchini had finished the score in November 1785, and the enthusiastic Marie-Antoinette was keen for it to be given at court on 4 January 1786 to mark the opening of the new theatre at the Palace of Versailles (even though the finishing touches had not been made to the building). Perhaps because of difficulties with rehearsals, the one and only performance at court had limited success, but fate denied the composer the satisfaction of seeing it again, either at court, or at the Opéra. His pupil Henri Montan Berton, himself an opera composer, described the circumstances which delayed further performances:

Queen Marie Antoinette, who loved and cultivated the arts, had promised Sacchini that Oedipe would be the first opera to be performed at the court theatre after its transfer to Fontainebleau. Sacchini had shared the good news with us and continued his habit of meeting Her Majesty after she had heard mass, when she invited him to join her in her music salon. There she took pleasure in listening to some of the finest excerpts from Arvire et Évélina, the opera [with words by] Guillard on which he was then working. Having noticed that, for several Sundays in a row, the Queen seemed to avoid catching his eye, Sacchini – tormented with anxiety – deliberately placed himself in her way so that Her Majesty had no choice but to speak with him. She received him in the music salon and told him, in a voice full of emotion: 'My dear Sacchini, people say I show too much favour to foreigners. They have pressured me so strongly to have Monsieur Lemoyne's Phèdre performed instead of your Œdipe that I could not refuse. You see the position I am in, please forgive me.'

Sacchini, struggling to contain his distress, bowed respectfully and immediately returned to Paris. He was brought to my mother's house. He entered in tears and threw himself into an armchair. We could only get a few broken phrases from him: 'My good friend, my children, I'm finished. The Queen, she no longer loves me! The Queen, she no longer loves me!' All our efforts to allay his grief were in vain. He refused to have dinner with us. He was very ill with gout...we took him back to his house and three [days] later he died at the age of 56.

Sacchini died on 6 October 1786, aged 56, leaving the score of Arvire et Évélina incomplete. It was finished by Jean-Baptiste Rey, the head of the Opéra, and successfully produced on 29 April 1788.

Sacchini's dramatic death caught the public's imagination. The involvement of the queen and a sincerely appreciative article by Piccinni, who dedicated a moving funeral oration to the dead composer, turned popular opinion in his favour. The management of the Académie Royale, without even waiting for the usual pressure from above, ordered Œdipe à Colone to go into rehearsal at the Théâtre de la Porte Saint-Martin, then the temporary home of the Opéra. "The first performance of Œdipe à Colone took place on Tuesday 1 February 1787 ... The hall was packed, and many people had to remain standing ... The turnout made the triumph even more impressive." Its success was resounding and lasting: henceforward, the work was staged in Paris's leading theatre every year from 1787 to 1830, and revived in July 1843 and May 1844, giving a total of 583 performances, making it Sacchini's most famous opera and one of the most durable of the eighteenth-century repertoire, surpassing even the operas of Gluck, at least until it fell into the oblivion in which it has more or less remained until today, along with the rest of Sacchini's work.

== Musical style ==
"The real significance of Sacchini's work is difficult to determine aesthetically, although the obvious historical importance of the composer and his activity undoubtedly demands more careful study and more thorough investigation": with these words the editor of Sacchini's article in the Grande Enciclopedia della Musica Lirica begins the section evaluating his music. Any such assessment is made more difficult by the comparative lack of interest the modern operatic world has shown in Sacchini's works, although this has begun to change in the early 21st century: there are now two complete recordings of Œdipe à Colone and one of Renaud.

In his own time, Sacchini was described as the champion of melody. Indeed, the composer Giuseppe Carpani, about twenty years his junior, said that Sacchini might even be considered the finest melodist in the world. This melodic gift, along with the general facility Sacchini found in composing music, was undoubtedly the result of his upbringing amid the flourishing Neapolitan school of opera. From the beginning, however, Sacchini revealed a tendency to distance himself from the more hackneyed features of the Italian operatic tradition. "Only rarely did he adhere to the complete da capo form, but he often made use of altered versions of this basic plan. He also made frequent use of a cavatina-like two-part aria that approximates to the A portion of the da capo form, and of the vocal rondò, in both comic and serious works." However, it was only when he became part of "an international musical milieu and with the acquisition of a much broader and more diverse experience that Sacchini's finest qualities achieved complete maturity." This is true above all of the period in Paris, when he "strengthened his own style with an obviously Gluckian influence, which was not, however, strong enough to cancel out his melodic and sensuous gifts", which derived from the Italian tradition, "while his orchestral palette was also enriched by new and vivid colours, which frequently anticipated many aspects of the future Romantic movement." The most characteristic work in this respect is undoubtedly Œdipe à Colone, but the description also applies to Dardanus: "these are operas in which every element lacking a dramatic function has been removed. Accompanied recitatives, ariosos and arias blend naturally into one another...[giving life] to scenes whose unity is guaranteed by the use of the same thematic material...the combination of cavatina and cabaletta is particularly successful, and it was destined to become a common feature of opera in the following century...[finally] the choral scenes, alternating chorus and soloists, are highly effective, on the one hand revealing the influence of Gluck, and on the other showing the way forward to the grand opera of Spontini." Writing in Grove, David DiChiera concludes, "With his masterpiece, Œdipe, Sacchini admirably achieved a synthesis of Italian melodic style and Gluckian principles within a French dramatic framework".

== Works ==
Unless otherwise stated in the footnotes, the following list of Sacchini's works is drawn from the "biographical summary" by Georges Sauvé (Sauvé 2006). The list of works is still incomplete, mainly as far as non-operatic music is concerned.

=== Operas ===
Title	Genre	Acts	Premiere (place)	Premiere (date)	Revisions and notable revivals
Fra Donato	intermezzo	2 acts	Naples	1756	
Il giocatore	intermezzo		Naples	1757	
Olimpia tradita	commedia		Naples	1758	
Il copista burlato	commedia		Naples	1759	
La vendemmia	intermezzo	1 act	Rome	1760	Revised for Barcelona in 1767
Il testaccio	opera buffa		Rome	1760	
I due fratelli beffati	commedia		Naples	1760	
Andromaca	opera seria		Naples	30 May 1761	
La finta contessa	farsetta		Rome	1761	
Li due bari	opera buffa		Naples	1762	
L'amore in campo	dramma giocoso	2 acts	Rome	1762	
Alessandro Severo	opera seria	3 acts	Venice	Carnival 1763	
Alessandro nell'Indie	opera seria		Venice	1763	
Olimpiade	opera seria	3 acts	Padua	1763	Revived in Paris in 1777 as a pasticcio with music by Sacchini, under the title L'olympiade, to a translation by N.E. Framery
Semiramide riconosciuta	opera seria	3 acts	Rome	1764	
Eumene	opera seria		Florence	1764	
Lucio Vero	opera seria		Naples	4 November 1764	Partly revived in London in 1773 as a pasticcio
Il finto pazzo per amore	intermezzo	2 acts	Rome	1765	Multiple revivals
Creso	opera seria	3 acts	Naples	1765	Revised for London in 1774 and, under the new title of Euriso, in 1781
La contadina in corte	opera buffa		Rome	1765	Multiple revivals (London, 1782)
L'isola d'amore	dramma giocoso	2 acts	Rome	1766	Revived in Paris in 1775, to a translation by N.E. Framery entitled La colonie, as a pasticcio with music by Sacchini, in the form of an opéra-comique. The original Italian version was also revised for London in 1776 while the French one was furtherly reworked in German in 1779
Le contadine bizzarre			Milan	1766	
Artaserse	opera seria	3 acts	Rome	1768	
Il Cidde	opera seria	3 acts	Roma	1769	
Nicoraste	opera seria	3 acts	Venice	1769	
Scipione in Cartagena	opera seria		Munich	8 January 1770	
Calliroe	opera seria		Ludwigsburg	1770	
L'eroe cinese	opera seria		Munich	1770	
Adriano in Siria	opera seria		Venice	1770	
Ezio	opera seria		Naples	1771	
Armida	opera seria	3 acts	Milan and Florence	1772	Revised for London in 1780 as Rinaldo
Vologeso	opera seria		Parma	1772	
Il Cid	opera seria		London	19 January 1773	
Tamerlano	opera seria		London	1773	
Perseo	opera seria	3 acts	London	1774	
Nitteti	opera seria	3 acts	London	1774	
Motezuma	opera seria	3 acts	London	1775	Often incorrectly titled 'Montezuma'
Didone abbandonata	opera seria		London	1775	
Erifile	opera seria	3 acts	London	1778	
L'amore soldato	dramma giocoso	3 acts	London	1778	Revived in Paris in 1779 (Sacchini's debut at the Paris Opéra)
L'avaro deluso, o Don Calandrino	dramma giocoso	3 acts	London	1778	
Enea e Lavinia	opera seria	3 acts	London	1779	
Mitridate	opera seria		London	1781	
Rosina			London	1783	
Renaud	opéra (tragédie lyrique)	3 acts	Paris	1783	
Chimène	tragédie lyrique	3 acts	Fontainebleau	1783	
Dardanus	tragédie	4 acts	Paris	1784	
Œdipe à Colone	tragédie lyrique	3 acts	Versailles	4 January 1786	
Arvire et Évélina (unfinished, completed by Jean-Baptiste Rey)	tragédie lyrique	3 acts	Paris	1788	

==== Operas written in collaboration with other musicians ====
In this section are listed the operas containing original music by Sacchini and by other composers.

- Niccolò Piccinni
  - Le donne dispettose (Naples, 1754) (uncertain)
  - Le trame per amore (Naples 1759) (uncertain)
  - Il curioso imprudente (Naples, 1761)
  - La massara spiritosa (Naples, 1761)
  - Il Cavalier partigiano (Naples, 1762)
- Fedele Fenaroli
  - I due sediarii (Naples, 1759)
- Baldassare Galuppi
  - Villano (Venice?, 1762?)
- Tommaso Giordani
  - Le vicende della sorte (1770)

=== Instrumental music ===
Nearly all instrumental music published by Antonio Sacchini dates from his London years (1772–1781). Most of the works listed below, first published in London, were later reprinted in Paris and elsewhere.

- 2 sinfonias printed in Paris in 1767
- Periodical Overture n. 49, in 8 parts, Bremner, London, 1776
- 6 trio sonatas, for two violins and basso continuo, Op. 1, London, Bremner, 1775
- 6 string quartets, Op. 2, London 1778
- 6 sonatas for harpsichord or piano and violin, Op. 3, London, 1779
- 6 sonatas for harpsichord or piano and violin (2nd set of favourite lessons), Op. 4, London, 1780

=== Sacred music ===
Sacchini's sacred works were composed for the most part during his directorship at the conservatoire of the Ospedaletto in Venice. Significantly, all Venice compositions are in major tonality.

- 1761 Gesù presentato al tempio, oratorio, Naples
- 1764 L'umiltà esaltata, oratorio, Naples
- 1766 L'abbandono delle richezze di San Filippo Neri, oratorio, Bologna
- 1768 II popolo di Giuda liberato della morte per intercessione della regina Esther, oratorio, Venice
- 1768 Magnificat in D major, Venice
- 1768 Salve Regina in G major, antiphon, Venice
- 1768 Fremo gemendo in poena in B major, psalm, Venice
- 1768 Sicut lilia in valle amoena in F major, psalm, Venice
- 1769 Mass in D major (Kyrie, gloria), Venice
- 1769 Te Deum in D major, Venice
- 1769 Habet amor suas procellas in D major, Venice
- 1769 Aurae de caelo in B major, Venice
- 1769 Charitas omnia vincit (modi sacri), motet, Venice
- 1769 Paventi ut nautae in G major, psalm, Venice
- 1770 Salve Regina in F major, hymn (antiphon), Venice
- 1770 Machabaeorum mater, azione sacra (actio sacra), Venice
- 1771 Ave Regina caelorum in F major, hymn (antiphon), Venice
- 1771 O quam carae et quam beatae silvae, psalm, Venice
- 1771 Jephtes sacrificium azione sacra (actio sacra), Venice
- 1772 Miserere in E major, psalm, Venice
- 1772 Regina caeli in D major, antiphon, Venice
- 1772 Missa solemnis in D major (Kyrie, gloria, credo), Venice
- 1772 Cor serba te fidelem in F major, psalm, Venice
- 1772 Nuptiae Ruth, azione sacra (actio sacra), Venice
- 1786 Juditta, oratorio, Paris

Undated, but traceable back to the Venetian period (1768–1772)

- Ave Regina caelorum in E major, hymn (antiphon), Venice
- Regina caeli in B major, antiphon, Venice

=== Salon vocal music ===
Georges Sauvé reports that there exist "numerous works not yet catalogued, in Italy, in London (including nine 1775 duets), in Paris, in Dublin, ariettas which were published long after his death, arias, cantatas ..." There also exists Fanny Bazin's Music Book, a completely unpublished handwritten collection by Antonio Sacchini, dating back to 1785 and currently belonging to Sauvé himself, a descendant of Madame Bazin. It contains 19 melodies (16 for piano and soprano, 1 for piano solo, 1 duet for two sopranos and a quartet), and is due to be published by ELPE-Musique (Le Cahier de musique de Fanny Bazin). The book was used in the lessons Sacchini gave to the 11-year-old Bazin at the behest of Queen Marie Antoinette and "is witness to the refinement and intensity of the artistic life that Queen Marie Antoinette shared with those close to her".

== Sources ==
=== Bibliography ===
- Caruselli, Salvatore (ed.). Grande enciclopedia della musica lirica (in Italian). Rome: Longanesi & C. Periodici.
- DiChiera, David (1997). "Sacchini, Antonio (Maria Gasparo Gioacchino)". In Stanley Sadie (ed.). The New Grove Dictionary of Opera. Vol. IV. New York: Oxford University Press. pp. 114–116. ISBN 978-0-19-522186-2.
- Dorsi, Frabrizio; Rausa, Giuseppe (2000). Storia dell'opera italiana (in Italian). Turin: B. Mondadori. ISBN 978-88-424-9408-9.
- Florimo, Francesco (1869). Cenno storico sulla scuola musicale di Napoli. Del Cavalier Francesco Florimo, archivista del Real Collegio di musica in S. Pietro a Majella (in Italian). Naples: Lorenzo Rocco.
- Jullien, Adolphe (1878). La Cour et l'Opéra sous Louis XVI. Marie-Antoinette et Sacchini Salieri Favart et Gluck. D'après des documents inédits conservés aux Archives de l'État et à l'Opéra (in French). Paris: Librairie Académique (Didier). OL 14017446M.
- Lajarte, Théodore de (1878). Bibliothèque Musicale du Théatre de l'Opéra. Catalogue Historique, Chronologique, Anecdotique (in French). Vol. I. Paris: Librairie des bibliophiles.
- Pitou, Spire (1985). The Paris Opéra. An Encyclopedia of Operas, Ballets, Composers, and Performers – Rococo and Romantic, 1715–1815. Westport/London: Greenwood Press. ISBN 0-313-24394-8.
- Sauvé, Georges (2006). Antonio Sacchini 1730–1786 – Un musicien de Marie-Antoinette – Bréviaire biographique (in French). Paris: L'Harmattan. ISBN 2-296-01994-3.

=== Online sources ===
- (in Italian) Dizionario dell'opera (article on Renaud)
- (in French) ELPE-Musique: Œdipe à Colone
- This article contains material translated from the equivalent article in the Italian Wikipedia
