= Millico =

Millico is an Italian surname. Notable people with the surname include:

- Giuseppe Millico (1737–1802), Italian opera singer and composer
- Vincenzo Millico (born 2000), Italian football player
