= Renaud (opera) =

1783 opera by Antonio Sacchini

Antonio Sacchini

Renaud is an opera by Antonio Sacchini, first performed on 28 February 1783 by the Académie Royale de Musique at the Théâtre de la Porte Saint-Martin in Paris. It takes the form of a tragédie lyrique in three acts. The French libretto, by Jean-Joseph Lebœuf, (Note: Or Le Bœuf) is based on Cantos XVII and XX of Torquato Tasso's epic poem Gerusalemme liberata and, more directly, on the five-act tragedy by Simon-Joseph Pellegrin, Renaud, ou La suite d'Armide, which had been set to music by Henri Desmarets in 1722 and was intended as a sequel to Lully's famous opera Armide. According to Théodore Lajarte, Lebœuf was helped by Nicolas-Étienne Framery, the regular translator of Sacchini's libretti.

== Performance history ==
The premiere took place on 28 February 1783 at the Académie Royale de Musique (Salle du Théâtre de la Porte-Saint-Martin) in Paris, with Sacchini's patron Queen Marie-Antoinette among the audience. (Note: The queen, to whom Sacchini had been recommended by her brother Joseph II, also attended the fourth performance when the prima donna Levasseur handed over the role of Armide to Antoinette Cécile de Saint-Huberty (Lajarte 1878, p. 333)) The choreography was by Maximilien Gardel and the cast contained some of the stars of the Académie, including the haute-contre Joseph Legros and the soprano Rosalie Levasseur as Renaud and Armide. These would be the last roles they would play.

Renaud marked Sacchini's debut at the Académie Royale. His friend Framery, a great admirer of Italian music, had persuaded him to move from London to Paris. Sacchini had also accumulated a lot of debts in London which made life difficult for him there. It was not the first time Sacchini had written an opera on a story taken from Tasso: he had set Jacopo Durandi's libretto Armida to music in Milan in 1772 and had reworked the opera, under the new title Rinaldo, for London in 1780. But the events in these operas merely serve as the background to the action of Renaud.

The opera was a success, "thanks above all to Sacchini's score, which contains some superb passages" and was performed 51 times over the next two years. It was played another 76 times between 1789 and 1795 and finally enjoyed a brief revival in 1815. The opera had 130 performances all told before it left the repertoire for good.

== Roles ==
Roles, voice types, premier cast
Role	Voice type	Premiere cast, 28 February 1783
Renaud (Rinaldo), a leading Crusader, in love with Armide	haute-contre	Joseph Legros
Armide (Armida), Princess of Damascus, in love with Renaud	soprano	Rosalie Levasseur
Hidraot (Idraote), King of Damascus and father of Armide	baritone	François Lays
Adraste (Adrasto), King of India, in love with Armide	basse-taille (bass-baritone)	Auguste-Athanase (Augustin) Chéron
Tissapherne (Tissaferne), ruler of Cilicia, in love with Armide	basse-taille	Jean-Pierre (?) Moreau (Note: Moreau's alleged first name, Jean Pierre, is reported solely by Casaglia 2005)
Saracen knights	haute-contre and taille (baritenor)	Étienne Lainez and Jean-Joseph Rousseau (Note: Sources traditionally report only the initial letter (J.) of this singer's name; full details, however, can be found in "Organico dei fratelli a talento della Loggia parigina di Saint-Jean d'Écosse du Contrat Social (1773–89)" (list of the members of this Masonic lodge), reported as an Appendix in Zeffiro Ciuffoletti and Sergio Moravia (eds), La Massoneria. La storia, gli uomini, le idee, Milan, Mondadori, 2004, ISBN 978-8804536468 (in Italian).)
Mélisse (Melissa), confidante of Armide	soprano	Suzanne Joinville
Doris, confidante of Armide	soprano	Mlle Chateauvieux
Iphise (Ifisa), confidante of Armide	soprano	Anne-Marie-Jeanne Gavaudan, l'aînée
Antiope, commander of the Amazons	soprano	Marie-Thérèse Maillard
Arcas, commander of Hidraot's guards	basse-taille	Simon Chenard (o Chénard)
A nymph, a coryphée	soprano	Mlle Le Boeuf (Note: She was the librettist's daughter and "acquitted herself with honour" in the difficult italianate arietta, "Que l'éclat de la victoire", that concludes the opera (Dratwicki 2013, p. 81).)
Alecton (Alecto) and Tisiphone (Tisiphone) (en travesti)	taille and haute-contre	Étienne Lainez and Jean-Joseph Rousseau
Mégère (Megaera) (en travesti)	basse-taille	Jean-Pierre (?) Moreau
Chorus
Ballet – ballerinas: Marie-Madeleine Guimard, Gervais, Anne-Marguerite Dorival, Peslin, Dupré; male dancers: Auguste Vestris, Maximilien Gardel, Nivelon

== Synopsis ==
The action takes place in the Holy Land during the First Crusade.

=== Background ===
Armide, Princess of Damascus and a sorceress, has fallen in love with the crusader Renaud. Armide uses her magic to make Renaud fall in love with her too. However, two of Renaud's fellow knights manage to find him and free him from the spell, allowing Renaud to take his place among the crusaders once again. The abandoned Armide is consumed with fury and desperation.

=== Act 1 ===
Renaud arrives at the camp of the Saracen King of Damascus, Armide's father, Hidraot, to offer peace to the Muslims if they will cede Jerusalem. Hidraot and his allies are ready to accept when the furious Armide bursts in on her chariot, accusing them of cowardice and promising her hand in marriage to whoever kills the treacherous Renaud. Once Renaud has left, Armide's followers vow to kill him (Chorus: "Arbitre et souverain du sort!") and the act ends with the arrival of the warlike Amazons, in a ballet according to French operatic convention.

=== Act 2 ===
Armide, having calmed down, reveals that she is still in love with Renaud. But Antiope, Queen of the Amazons, announces that Armide's followers have laid an ambush for the crusader. Armide rushes to his aid. Although she fails to persuade him to love her again (Duet: "Généreux inconnu ..."), she succeeds in warning him of the trap the Saracen chiefs are planning. Hidraot arrives and rebukes Armide for giving in to her love for Renaud; the crusader has been causing carnage in the Muslim camp. Armide uses her magic to conjure up the Furies, but they are held back by a mysterious higher power. Hidraot disowns his daughter and returns to the camp, intending either to kill Renaud, or "to perish by his blows".

=== Act 3 ===
The battle is over and Armide searches for her father in vain, but finds Adraste, King of India, still breathing. Adraste blames Armide's double-dealing for his death and Hidraot's impending slaughter at the hands of Renaud. Armide prays to heaven to strike her down and save her father and, when she hears that Hidraot has been bound in chains to the chariot of the victorious Renaud, she decides to kill herself. Renaud enters and tries to stop her. She is only reassured when her father arrives and tells her that he owes his life to the crusader. Armide and Renaud are reconciled and free at last to declare their love for one another. The scene magically changes to a magnificent palace and the opera ends with a ballet général.

== Recordings ==
=== Complete ===
- Renaud Marie Kalinine (Armide), Julian Dran (Renaud), Jean-Sébastien Bou (Hidraot), Les Chantres du Centre de Musique Baroque de Versailles, Les Talens Lyriques, conducted by Christophe Rousset (Ediciones Speciales, 2013)

=== Individual arias ===
Armide's act 2 aria ("Hélas vous le dirais-je....Ah! Que dis-tu?") was recorded by Véronique Gens on the album Tragédiennes 2, accompanied by the orchestra Les Talens Lyriques conducted by Christophe Rousset (Virgin Classics, 2009).

The Italianate aria of a coryphée ("Que l'éclat de la victoire") was recorded by Sandrine Piau on the album Le triomphe de l'amour, accompanied by the orchestra Les Paladins conducted by Jérôme Correas (Naïve Records, 2012).
