= Maddalena Laura Sirmen =

Italian composer, musician, and singer (1745–1818)

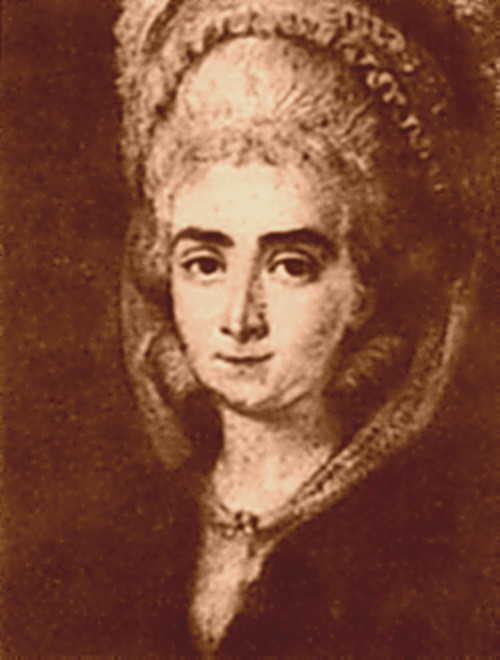
- Born: Maddalena Laura Lombardini; 9 December 1745; Venice, Republic of Venice
- Died: 18 May 1818 (aged 72); Venice, Lombardy–Venetia, Austrian Empire
- Other names: Maddalena Laura Syrmen; Maddalena Laura Ceriman; Madame Sirmen
- Occupations: Composer; violinist; opera singer
- Era: Classical period
- Spouse: Ludovico Sirmen (m. 1769)

Maddalena Laura Sirmen (Note: Italian pronunciation: [maddaˈleːna ˈlaura sirˈmɛn, maddaˈlɛːna -]. The surname is also spelled as Syrmen or Ceriman; most of her compositions were published under the name Syrmen.) (née Lombardini; 9 December 1745 – 18 May 1818), commonly known as Madame Sirmen, was an Italian composer, violinist, and opera singer of the musical Classical period.

== Biography ==
=== Birth and background ===
Maddalena Laura Lombardini was born on 9 December 1745 in Venice. Her parents, Piero Lombardini and his wife, Gasparina (née Gambirasi), were poor, though they came from noble origins.

At a young age, Maddalena showed musical talent and later began her studies at San Lazzaro dei Mendicanti. Whilst attending San Lazzaro dei Mendicanti, Maddalena received violin lessons from Giuseppe Tartini, visiting him in Padua. By the age of fourteen, she was teaching violin.

=== Career (1767–1785) ===
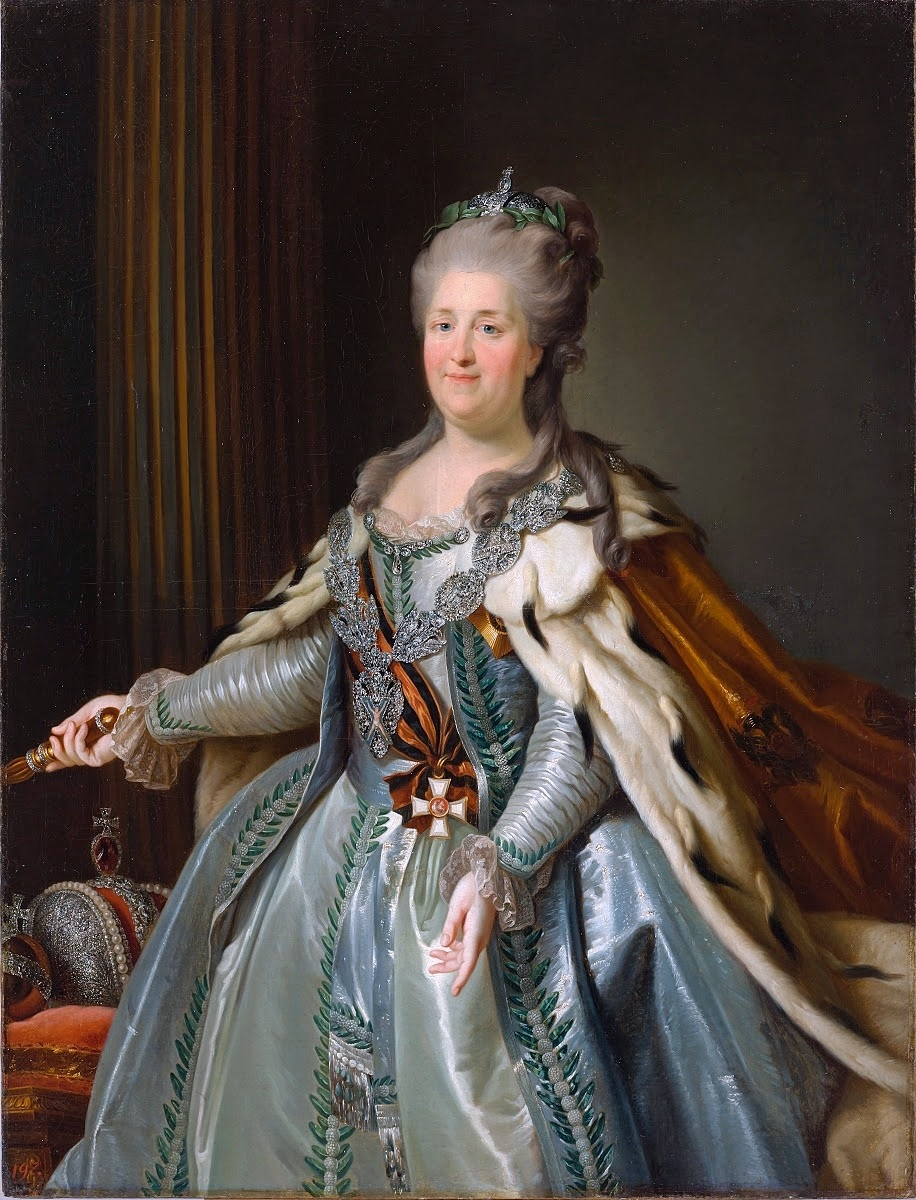
Empress Catherine II, c. 1780s

In 1767, Maddalena graduated from San Lazzaro dei Mendicanti and was given an opportunity to pursue an independent musical career in Venice. In the autumn of 1767, Maddalena married violinist Ludovico Sirmen, after which time she was known as Laura Lombardini Sirmen di Ravenna.

An early critical notice she received as an adult performer was from Quirino Gasparini, who wrote:

"She won the hearts of all the people of Turin with her playing . . . I wrote to old Tartini last Saturday telling him the good news. It will make him all the happier, since this student of his plays his violin compositions with such perfection that it is obvious she is his descendant".

Maddalena and her husband embarked on a two-year tour in 1768, travelling to Turin, Paris, and then in 1770 to London. She made her debut as a soloist in London in January 1771 at the King's Theatre. In 1773, Maddalena performed as a singer in London, where music critics expressed that vocals only distracted her from improving her violin playing. She gave more than two hundred performances in London, including her own concertos. In Russia, she worked with her husband from the spring of 1783 to September 1784, performing as a violinist and singer at the court of Catherine II.

In 1785, in Paris, Maddalena delivered her last performance as a violinist. (Note: Critics claimed that her playing style was outdated and did not correspond to the spirit of the times.) After she ended her solo career, Maddalena returned to Italy, where she died on 18 May 1818 at the age of 72.
