= Paride ed Elena =

Opera by Christoph Willibald Gluck

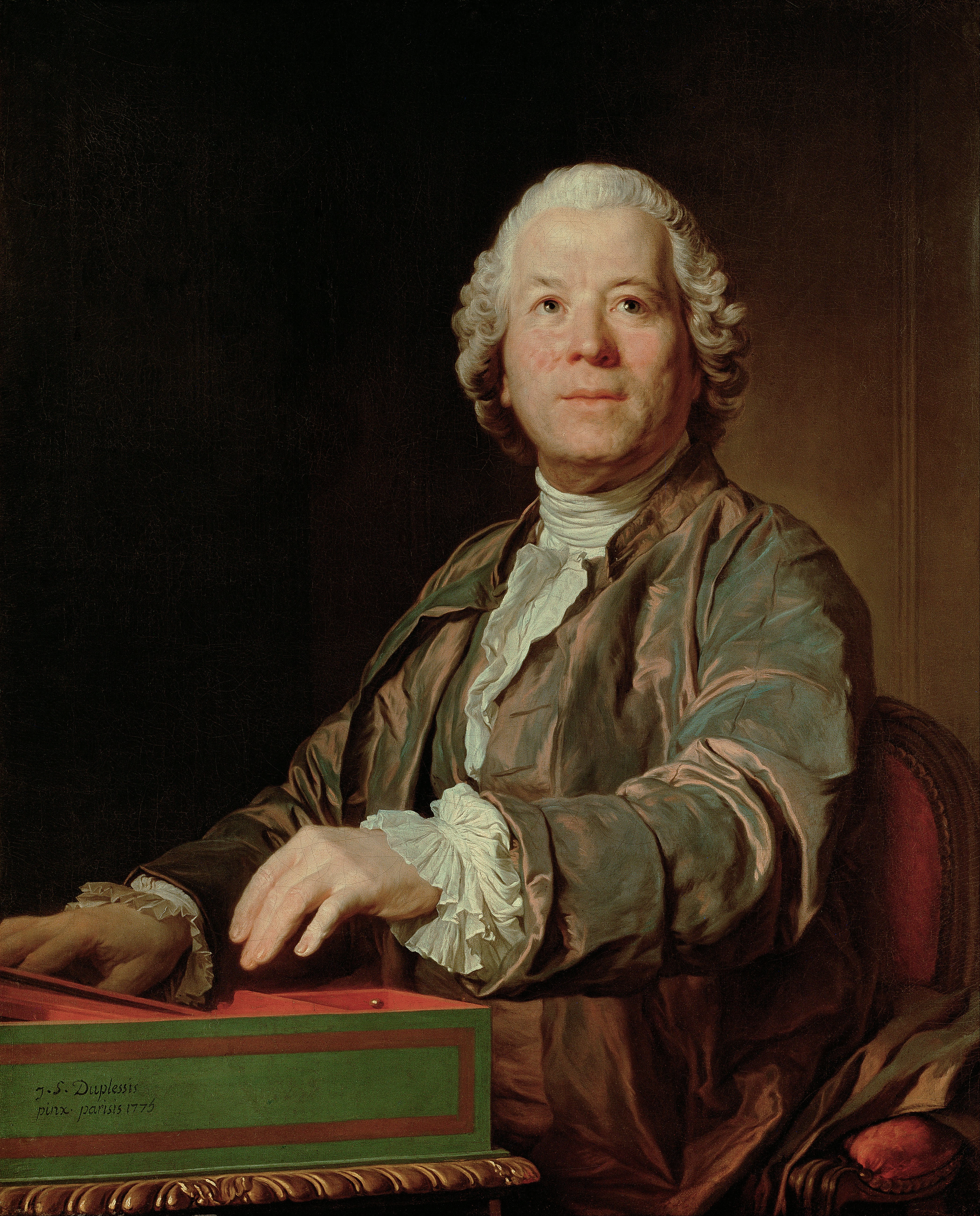
Portrait of Christoph Willibald Gluck by Joseph Duplessis (1775)

Paride ed Elena (Italian pronunciation: [ˈpaːride ed ˈɛːlena]; Paris and Helen) is an opera by Christoph Willibald Gluck. It is the third of Gluck's so-called reform operas for Vienna, following Orfeo ed Euridice and Alceste, and the least often performed of the three. Like its predecessors, the libretto was written by Ranieri de' Calzabigi. The opera tells the story of the events between the Judgment of Paris and the flight of Paris and Helen to Troy. It was premiered at the Burgtheater in Vienna on 3 November 1770.

== Roles ==
Role	Voice type	Premiere cast, 3 November 1770 (Conductor: – )
Paride (Paris), son of King Priam of Troy	soprano castrato	Giuseppe Millico
Elena (Helen), Queen of Sparta	soprano	Katherina Schindler
Amore (Cupid), under the name of Erasto, Helen's confidant	soprano (en travesti)	Teresa Kurz
Pallas Athene, the goddess	soprano	Gabriella Tagliaferri
A Trojan	soprano	

== Synopsis ==
The hero Paris is in Sparta, having chosen Aphrodite above Hera and Athena, sacrificing to Aphrodite and seeking, with the encouragement of Erasto, the love of Helen. Paris and Helen meet at her royal palace and each is struck by the other's beauty. She calls on him to judge an athletic contest and when asked to sing he does so in praise of her beauty, admitting the purpose of his visit is to win her love. She dismisses him. In despair Paris pleads with her, and she begins to give way. Eventually, through the intervention of Erasto, who reveals himself as Cupid, she gives way, but Pallas Athene (Athena) warns them of sorrow to come. In the final scene Paris and Helen make ready to embark for Troy.

== Arias ==
Arias from the opera that enjoy an independent concert existence include Paris's minor-key declaration of love, "O del mio dolce ardor" (O of my gentle love), in the first act. His second aria is "Spiagge amate" (Beloved shores). In the second act, again in a minor key, Paris fears that he may lose Helen in "Le belle immagini" (The fair semblance) and in the fourth would prefer death to life without Helen, "Di te scordarmi, e vivere" (To forget you and to live). The role of Paris offers difficulties of casting, written, as it was, for a relatively high castrato voice. Arias of Paris have been adapted for tenors, with transposition an octave lower, or appropriated by sopranos and mezzo-sopranos.

The aria "O del mio dolce ardor" was arranged for orchestra by Tchaikovsky in October 1870.

== Performance history ==
After the première in the Burgtheater, Vienna, in 1770, there were 25 further performances in Vienna before 1800 (contrasting with more than 100 of his Orfeo ed Euridice and more than 70 of Alceste).

It seems that Gluck did not bring this opera to Paris - he was in Paris from 1773, but it was not performed there at this time.

The opera was put on in Naples in 1777 but no other productions have been traced until 1901, when it was revived in Prague, and 1905, when it was produced in Hamburg (in German, in a cut version in two acts). Nevertheless, a New York Times critic wrote that it had been performed in Berlin in 1863. (Note: The critic may have had in mind the concert in Berlin on 28 November 1863 when Hans von Bülow conducted his arrangement of the overture of Paris and Helen, with Richard Wagner in the audience. Wagner recorded in his memoirs: "As Bülow had to make some preparation for his concert I again went for a drive in a hansom carriage alone with Cosima [von Bülow, who later married Wagner]. This time we fell silent and all joking ceased. We gazed mutely into each other's eyes and an intense longing for the fullest avowal of the truth forced us to a confession, requiring no words whatever, of the incommensurable misfortune that weighed upon us. With tears and sobs we sealed a vow to belong to each other alone. It lifted a great weight from our hearts. The profound tranquility which ensued gave us the serenity to attend the concert without any sense of oppression. As a matter of fact, a sensitive and buoyant performance of Beethoven's small concert overture (in C major) together with the very clever arrangement by Hans of Gluck's overture to Paris and Helen, even managed to attract my close attention.)

The opera received its first performance in the US in 1954 at the Town Hall in Manhattan. Another production was given at the Mannes College of Music in New York in 1991.

In the UK, the first performance was in Manchester in November 1963. What seems to have been the London première was on 21 October 2003, at the Barbican Hall.

There have been concert performances from time to time, and one in 1983 was followed by a recording. The opera was staged at the Drottningholm Theatre in Stockholm in 1987, with Magdalena Kožená as Paris.

In 2014 Essential Opera performed the opera in Toronto and Kitchener, Canada.

Odyssey Theatre staged the opera in Boston in February 2019.

Bampton Classical Opera plans to perform the opera in summer 2021, the 2020 performances having been postponed.

Seattle-based Puget Sound Concert Opera gave two unstaged performances in November, 2024.

== Recordings ==
"O del mio dolce ardor" (4:03)
Performed in 1935 by Beniamino Gigli; orchestra members of La Scala, Milan, conducted by Dino Olivieri

- Franco Bonisolli (Paride), Ileana Cotrubaș (Elena), Gabriele Fontana (Pallade), Sylvia Greenberg (Amore); ORF Symphony Orchestra and Chorus, Lothar Zagrosek (Orfeo, 2002)
- Magdalena Kožená (Paride), Susan Gritton (Elena), Carolyn Sampson (Amore), Gillian Webster (Pallade/Un Trojano); Gabrieli Consort and Players, Paul McCreesh (Deutsche Grammophon Archiv, 2005)
- Paride: Lajos Kozma, Elena: Magda László, Eros/Aristeo: Valeria Mariconda, Giovane Trojano: Lorenza Canepa, Pallade: Linda Vajna, Troiano: Doro Antonioli. RAI di Milano Choir and Orchestra – Conductor: Mario Rossi. Recorded 5 September 1968.
