= Armida (Sacchini) =

- Opera seria by Antonio Sacchini
- Antonio Sacchini, engraved portrait
- Librettist: Jacopo Durandi
- Language: Italian
- Based on: Torquato Tasso's Gerusalemme liberata
- Premiere: 28 February 1782; Teatro Regio Ducale, Milan

Armida is an opera seria in three acts with music by Antonio Sacchini set to a libretto by Jacopo Durandi (a.k.a. Giacomo Duranti), based on the epic poem Gerusalemme liberata by Torquato Tasso. The opera was first performed during the 1772 Carnival season at the Teatro Regio Ducale in Milan.

In Armida, Sacchini incorporated many elements of French opera, including frequent use of chorus, ballet, and theatrical spectacle on a grand scale. Sacchini later wrote two more operas loosely based on the same story from Tasso: the 1780 London work Rinaldo, and his first French opera, Renaud, which was dedicated to Marie Antoinette.

== Roles ==
| Role | Voice type | Premiere cast 11 February 1772 |
|---|---|---|
| Armida | soprano | Antonia Girelli Aguilar |
| Rinaldo | soprano castrato | Vito Giuseppe Millico |
| Ubaldo | bass | Giovanni Battista Zonca |
| Idreno | alto castrato | Giuseppe Cicognani |
| Clotarco | contralto | Rosa Polidora |
