= Catherine Naglestad =

American opera singer (born 1965)

Catherine Naglestad (born 7 November 1965) is an American soprano performing in Europe and internationally. She grew up in the San Francisco Bay Area. In 2006, she was named Singer of the Year by Opernwelt in Germany for her portrayal of Norma, Alceste, and Elisabetta.

== Early life and education ==
Naglestad was born in San Jose, California and grew up in Sacramento. At age 12, she started singing musical theater before deciding to pursue a career in opera. At age 17, she moved to San Francisco where she studied at the San Francisco Conservatory, furthering her studies in Rome, Milan and New York.

== Career ==
She has performed leading roles in opera houses and concert halls around the world, including the Royal Opera House in London, Paris Opéra Bastille, Berlin State Opera, and Suntory Hall in Tokyo.

== Reception ==
Opera Canada said in a 2012 review of Andreas Kriegenburg's staging of Wagner's Der Ring des Nibelungen for the Bavarian State Opera that "Catherine Naglestad had the lyricism and youthful beauty for the Siegfried Brünnhilde".

In a 2008 review of Busoni's Doktor Faust, critic Shirley Apthorp wrote in FT.com that "Amid all this testosterone-laden heft, Catherine Naglestad's exquisitely rounded, sensual Duchess of Parma provides a welcome note of lyricism." In a review of the cast recording, Richard Sininger said in American Record Guide that "Catherine Naglestad reveals a gleaming soprano as the Duchess."

Opera News said in a 2002 recording review that "Catherine Naglestad's Alcina is a complex figure – regal, headstrong and even somewhat sympathetic. The bright, impressive upper range of her voice, topped by a effortless high D, serves her well in the cadenzas."

Gramophone gave her a poor review for her lead role in Gluck's Alceste; much of the review focused on her costume, hair styling, and uninspired acting, rather than her singing, and the role is notoriously difficult.
