= Quirino Gasparini =

Italian composer

Quirino Gasparini (24 October 1721 – 26 September 1778) was an Italian composer, born in Gandino, near Bergamo, Italy. He studied for the priesthood, but largely devoted his life to music, becoming maestro de capello at Turin's cathedral. His compositions are mainly of church music, including a Stabat Mater which is still performed occasionally. He also wrote several operas, including a 1767 setting of Vittorio Amadeo Cigna-Santi's libretto Mitridate, re di Ponto, which three years later was also set by the 14-year-old Wolfgang Amadeus Mozart for the 1770 Milan carnival.

One of Gasparini's arias, preferred by the tenor singer over Mozart's version of it, was sung at the Milan performance and is still included in modern publications of the opera's score. According to some accounts, Gasparini tried to subvert the Milan prima donna Antonia Bernasconi, attempting to persuade her to sing his settings of her arias rather than Mozart's. His ruse was, however, unsuccessful. He died in Turin in 1778.

== Sources ==
- "Quirino Gasparini". stabatmater.info.
- Gutman, Robert W. (1999). Mozart. Orlando: Harcourt Inc. ISBN 0-15-601171-9.
- Sadie, Stanley (2006). Mozart: The Early Years 1756-1781. New York: W.W. Norton Inc. ISBN 0-393-06112-4.
