= La contadina in corte =

- Opera buffa by Antonio Sacchini
- Antonio Sacchini, engraved portrait
- Librettist: Niccolò Tassi
- Language: Italian
- Premiere: 1765; Teatro Valle, Rome

La contadina in corte is an opera buffa in two acts by Antonio Sacchini, first performed at the Teatro Valle in Rome during the Carnival in 1765. The libretto was by Niccolò Tassi. It was a popular opera at the time of its first performance: by the 1780s it had been staged over 20 times in such diverse cities as Rome and Warsaw. Sacchini's original setting is an intermezzo with four roles.

There was a revival at the Teatro Verdi in Sassari in Sardinia in 1991, conducted by Gabriele Catalucci and directed by Gianni Marras.

== Roles ==
Role	Voice type	Premiere Cast, Carnival 1765 (Conductor:)
Tancia	soprano castrato (en travesti)	Giovanni Ripa
Sandrina	soprano castrato (en travesti)	Venanzio Rauzzini
Ruggiero	tenor	Antonio Boscoli
Berto	bass	Nicodemo Calcina

== Recordings ==
Sacchini: La contadina in corte - Sassari Symphony Orchestra

- Conductor: Gabriele Catalucci
- Principal singers: Cinzia Forte, Susanna Rigacci, Ernesto Palacio, Giorgio Gatti
- Recording date:? (published 1994)
- Label: Bongiovanni - (CD)
