= Didon (Piccinni) =

Tragédie lyrique in three acts by Niccolò Piccinni

- Tragédie lyrique by Niccolò Piccinni
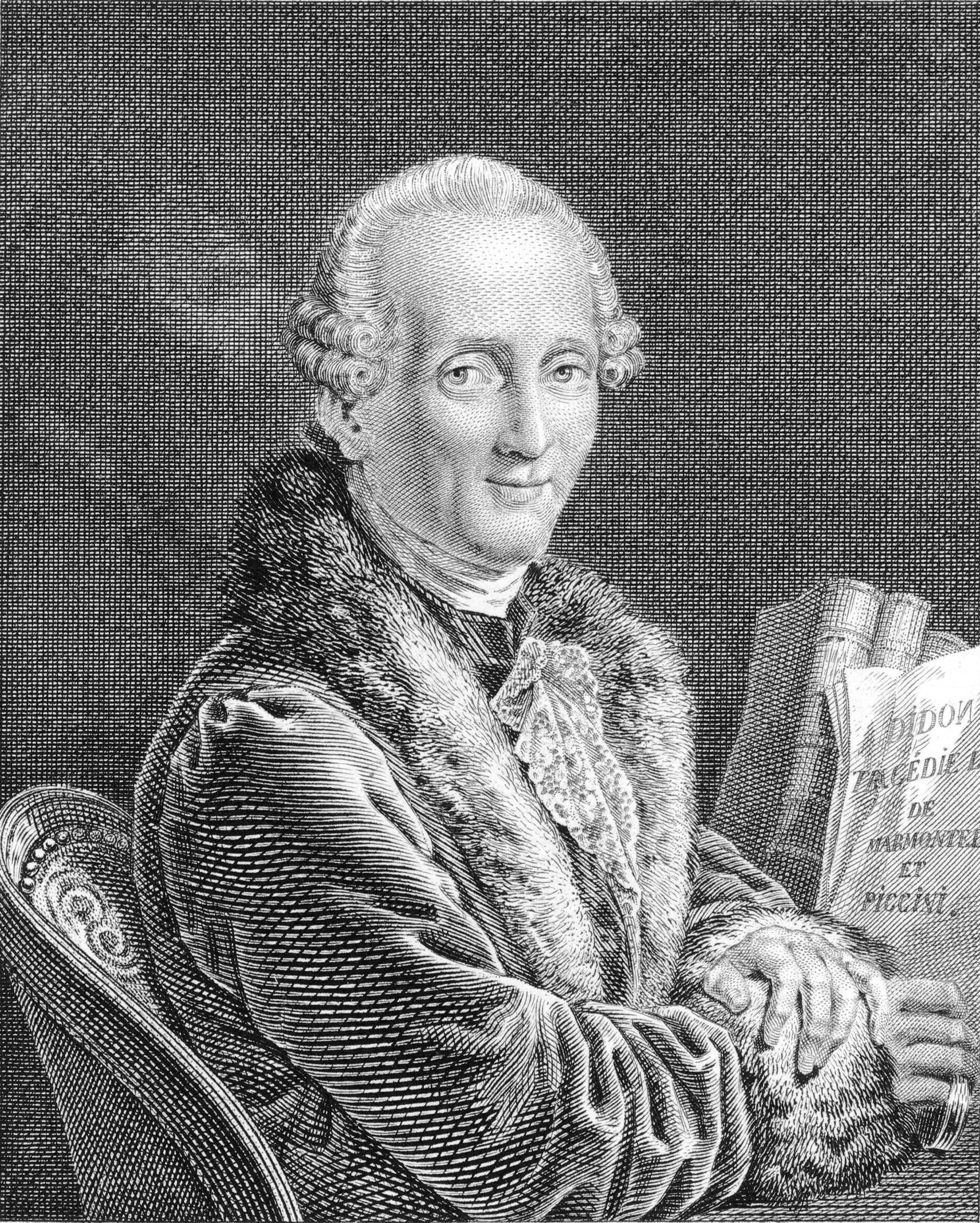
- Niccolò Piccinni, engraving by Hippolyte Pauquet
- Librettist: Jean-François Marmontel
- Language: French
- Based on: Dido
- Premiere: 16 October 1783; Fontainebleau

Didon (Dido) is a tragédie lyrique in three acts by the composer Niccolò Piccinni with a French-language libretto by Jean-François Marmontel. The opera is based on the story of Dido and Aeneas from Virgil's Aeneid as well as Metastasio's libretto Didone abbandonata (which Piccinni himself had set in 1770). Didon was first performed at Fontainebleau on 16 October 1783 in the presence of the French sovereigns, Louis XVI and Marie Antoinette. After being remounted at court twice, the opera had its Paris public premiere on 1 December 1783. It proved to be the composer's greatest success and was billed almost every year till 1826, enjoying a total of 250 performances at the Paris Opera. Didon had some influence on Berlioz's opera on the same theme, Les Troyens.

== Roles ==
Roles, voice types, premiere cast
Role	Voice type	Premiere cast: 16 October 1783
Didon, the Queen of Carthage	soprano	Antoinette Cécile de Saint-Huberty
Énée, a Trojan prince	tenor	Étienne Lainez
Iarbe, an African King	bass-baritone	Henri Larrivée
Phénice, a confidante of Dido	soprano	Adélaïde Gavaudan, cadette
Elise, Dido's sister	soprano	Suzanne Joinville
Un confident d'Iarbe, a confidant of Iarbas	bass-baritone	Louis-Claude-Armand Chardin ("Chardiny")
Pretres de Pluton, priests of Pluto	bass-baritones and tenors	Messieurs Moreau; Chardiny; Jean-Joseph Rousseau; Dufrenaye (or Dufresnay); Tacusset; Leroux (or Le Roux)
Une ombre, the shade of Anchises	bass-baritone	Auguste-Athanase (Augustin) Chéron
Dido's followers, Carthaginian people, Trojan warriors: choir
Ballet – ballerinas: Marie-Madeleine Guimard, Peslin, Anne-Marguerite Dorival, Dorlay; male dancers: Maximilien Gardel, Nivelon, Laurent

== Synopsis ==
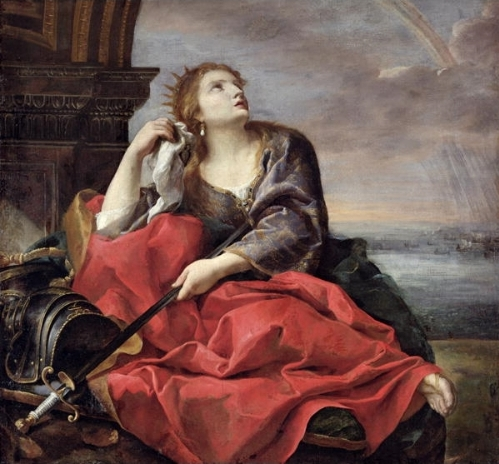
The Death of Dido, by Andrea Sacchi

Dido, Queen of Carthage (Didon), falls in love with the Trojan warrior Aeneas (Énée), who has been shipwrecked on her shore. However, Dido is promised in marriage to the African king Iarbas (Iarbe). War breaks out between Aeneas and Iarbas in which the Trojan is triumphant. But Aeneas is warned by the ghost of his father, Anchises, that he must leave Carthage at once for Italy. The heartbroken Dido commits suicide by throwing herself on a funeral pyre. Her Carthaginian subjects swear eternal revenge on Aeneas' descendants, the Romans.

== Recording ==
- Didon Soloists, Orchestra del Teatro Petruzzelli, conducted by Arnold Bosman (Dynamic, 2003)
