= Nicolas-Étienne Framery =

French music theorist, critic and lyric writer

Nicolas-Étienne Framery (French pronunciation: [nikɔla etjɛn fʁamʁi]; 25 March 1745 in Rouen – 26 November 1810 in Paris) was a French music theorist, critic and lyric writer associated with opera, especially opéra comique. He wrote and adapted librettos. His work became more academic and abstract and he eventually became surintendant de la musique for the Comte d'Artois, (who would become Charles X of France).

== Works ==
- 1700: Airs détachés de L'Olympiade, ou, Le triomphe de l'amitié : drame héroïque représenté par les Comédiens italiens au mois d'octobre 1777
- 1765: Ariettes détachées de Nanette et Lucas ou La Païsanne curieuse : comédie en un acte avec accompagnement de basse ou clavecin représentée à la Comédie Italienne, La Chevardiere
- 1796: Avis aux poëtes lyriques, ou De la nécessité du rythme et de la césure dans les hymnes ou odes destinés à la musique, Imprimerie de la République, Brumaire
- 1788: Calendrier musical universel, contenant l'indication des cérémonies d'église en musique les découvertes et les anecdotes de l'année... la notice des pièces en musique représentées... &c. &c. &c. Pour l'année 1788, Prault
- 1790: De l'organisation des spectacles de Paris, ou essai sur leur forme actuelle; sur les moyens de l'améliorer, Buisson
- 1802: Discours qui a remporté le prix de musique et déclamation proposé par la Classe de littérature et beaux-arts de l'institut national de France, et décerné dans sa séance du 15 nivôse, an X, sur cette question : Analyser les rapports qui existent entre la musique et la déclamation; – déterminer les moyens d'appliquer la déclamation à la musique, sans nuire à la mélodie, C. Pougens
- 1772–1776: Diverses lettres de Gluck
- 1791–1818: Encyclopédie méthodique. Musique, Charles-Joseph Panckoucke; Agasse, 1980–1989
- 1824: Jérusalem délivrée, Panckoucke
- 1785: L'enfer, poëme du Dante, traduction nouvelle, Mercure de France, June
- 1770: L'Indienne; one-act comedy mingled with ariettes, premiered by the Comédiens Italiens ordinaires du roi, Thursday 31 October, Veuve Duchesne, 1771
- 1783: L'infante de Zamora, three-act comedy mingled with ariettes, parodied on the music by la Frascatana, del Signor Paesielo, Ruault
- 1777: L'Olympiade, ou Le triomphe de l'Amitié, drame héroïque in three acts and in verse, mingled with music. Premiered by the Comédiens Italiens ordinaires du Roi, 2 October and at Fontainebleau, devant leurs majestés, 24th of the same month. La musique du sieur Sacchini, Veuve Duchesne
- 1775: La Colonie, two-act opéra comique, imitated from Italian and parodied on the music del Sgr. Sacchini. Premiered by the Comédiens italiens, 16 August, Veuve Duchesne, 1775
- 1783: La sorcière par hasard, opéra comique in verse mingled with music; premiered by the Comédiens Italiens ordinaires du Roy Thursday 3 7bre, Houbaut
- 1700: L'ariette du jour : Le triomphe de l'amitié
- 1750: Le Barbier de Séville, four-act opéra comique, set on music on the Italian translation, Made Baillon, 1784
- 1752: Le Miroir magique, one-act opéra comique, premiered at the Théâtre de la foire S. Laurent, 1 September, Duchesne, 1753
- 1786: Le musicien pratique ou, Leçons qui conduisent les élèves dans l'art du contrepoint, en leur enseignant la manière de composer correctement toute espèce de musique : ouvrage composé dans les principes des conservatoires d'Italie, par il Signor Francesco Azopardi maître de chapelle de Malthe. Translated from Italian by M. Framery, Le Duc, 1786; University of Rochester Press, 1957
- 1768: Les deux comtesses, opéra-bouffon, imitated from Italian and parodied on the music by the famous signor Paisiello, Le Duc
- 1768: Les Trois nations : contes nationaux, London; Veuve Duchesne
- 1780: L'Infante de Zamora, three-act opéra comique mingled with ariettes, parodied under the music by La Frascatana du célèbre Sgr. Paisiello, Le Duc
- 1777: L'Olympiade, ou Le triomphe de l'amitié, drame héroïque in three acts and in verse mingled with music; premiered by the les Comédiens Italiens ordinaires du roi, 2 October, & à Fontainebleau, devant Leurs Majestés, le 24 du même mois, Paris, Basset
- 1770: Mémoires de M. le marquis de S. Forlaix : recueillis dans les lettres de sa famille, Fétil
- 1791: Musique, Panckoucke; New York, Da Capo Press, 1971
- 1764: Nanette et Lucas, ou La paysanne curieuse, one-act comedy in prose mingled with ariettes with a bass or harpsichord accompaniment presented at the Comédie Italienne, Hérissant
- 1764: Nanette et Lucas : ou La paysanne curieuse, one-act comedy in prose mingled with ariettes, premiered by the Comédiens italiens 14 June; music by M. le chevalier d'Herbain, C. Harissant, 1764
- 1768: Nicaise, opéra-comique, Veuve Duchesne
- 1810: Notice sur Joseph Haydn, associé étranger de l'Institut de France : contenant quelques particularités de sa vie privée, relatives à sa personne ou à ses ouvrages, Barba
- 1783: Renaud, three-act tragédie lyrique, premiered by the Académie de musique Tuesday 25 February, Le Duc; New York, Broude, 1971
- 1791: Réponse des auteurs dramatiques, soussignés, à la pétition présentée à l'Assemblée nationale par des directeurs de spectacle, Du Pont
- 1787: Roland furieux, poème héroïque de l'Arioste, Plassan
- 1785: Tablettes de renommée des musiciens, auteurs, compositeurs, virtuoses, amateurs et maîtres de musique vocale et instrumentale, les plus connus en chaque genre : avec une notice des ouvrages aux autres motifs qui les ont rendus recommandables, Cailleau

== Sources ==
- Théodore-Éloi Lebreton, Biographie rouennaise, Rouen, Le Brument, 1865, (pp. 149–151).
