= Giuseppe Millico =

Italian opera singer (1737–1802)

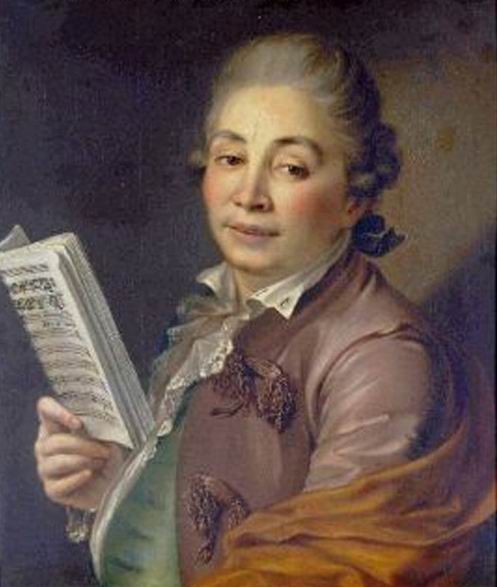
Giuseppe Millico

Vito Giuseppe Millico, called "Il Moscovita" (19 January 1737 – 2 October 1802), was an Italian soprano castrato, composer, and music teacher of the 18th century who is best remembered for his performances in the operas of Christoph Willibald Gluck.

== Biography ==
Millico was born at Terlizzi, near Bari. In 1754, he came to Naples. In 1757 in Rome, he had his first performance as a singer. From 1758 to 1765, he worked in Russia, and then returned to Italy. In 1769, Gluck adapted the role of Orpheus in his Orfeo ed Euridice for Millico to perform at Parma — the original role, composed for the alto castrato Gaetano Guadagni, was transposed up for Millico's soprano voice and the whole opera turned into an act of the celebratory work Le feste d'Apollo. In 1770, Millico sang, in the Vienna revival of Alceste, the originally tenor role of Admetus, which Gluck had specially rewritten for him, and created the role of Paris in the same composer's Paride ed Elena, the last in the trilogy of his Italian reform operas. "Gluck and Millico became firm friends, and Gluck entrusted the musical education of his beloved niece [Marianna] to Millico's care—no small tribute to the singer's musicianship".

After interpreting the role of Rinaldo in Antonio Sacchini's Armida and the title role in Josef Mysliveček's highly successful Il gran Tamerlano at the Teatro Regio Ducale in Milan during the carnival operatic season of 1772, Millico decided to partner with Sacchini in a move to London in order to serve as the "primo musico" (principal castrato) at the King's Theatre. Here he performed the leading male roles in the first London operas by Sacchini (Il Cid and Tamerlano, both in 1773). He was also involved in a failed attempt to counteract "the progressive watering-down, pasticcio-fashion," of Gluck’s Orfeo which had been initiated in London in 1770 with the active participation of Guadagni. Taking advantage of the availability at the King’s Theatre of both Parma main performers, Millico and Antonia Maria Girelli Aguilar, an original Gluck version of Orfeo and Euridice in one act was billed in summer 1773, but it turned out to be a complete fiasco and was dropped after only two performances. On his way back homeward in 1774, Millico called on Gluck in Paris and, as the French version of Orfeo ed Euridice was in laborious rehearsal, the composer would give two private test performances "at the house of the Abbé Morellet in which the tenor role of the French score was sung by Millico (with Gluck's niece Marianne taking both Eurydice and Cupid, and with Gluck at the harpsichord)".

After performing at Venice, Florence, Rome and Milan, Millico returned to Naples in 1780, where he became highly popular as a composer and teacher. He taught singing to the Bourbon princesses Maria Theresa and Luisa Maria, and to Emma Hamilton, not yet the lover of Lord Nelson. During this time at Naples, he composed eight operas that are confirmed as being his work, nearly all of which premiered in Naples — two to libretti by Metastasio and one to words by Ranieri de' Calzabigi, Gluck's librettist for his three Italian reform operas. The published score of Millico's opera La pietà d’amore includes a message of support for Gluck's attempted reforms of opera seria. Millico also composed eight cantatas, a Salve regina, 23 arias and 22 duets unattached to a dramatic work, and 82 canzonets. These works, usually written for harp accompaniment, were extremely popular at the time; many of them were published, either individually or as a part of collections. A collection of his keyboard compositions, Musical Trifles: a Collection of Sonatine, was published in 1791 in London. He lived in Naples until his death in 1802.
