= Niccolò Piccinni =

Italian composer (1728–1800)

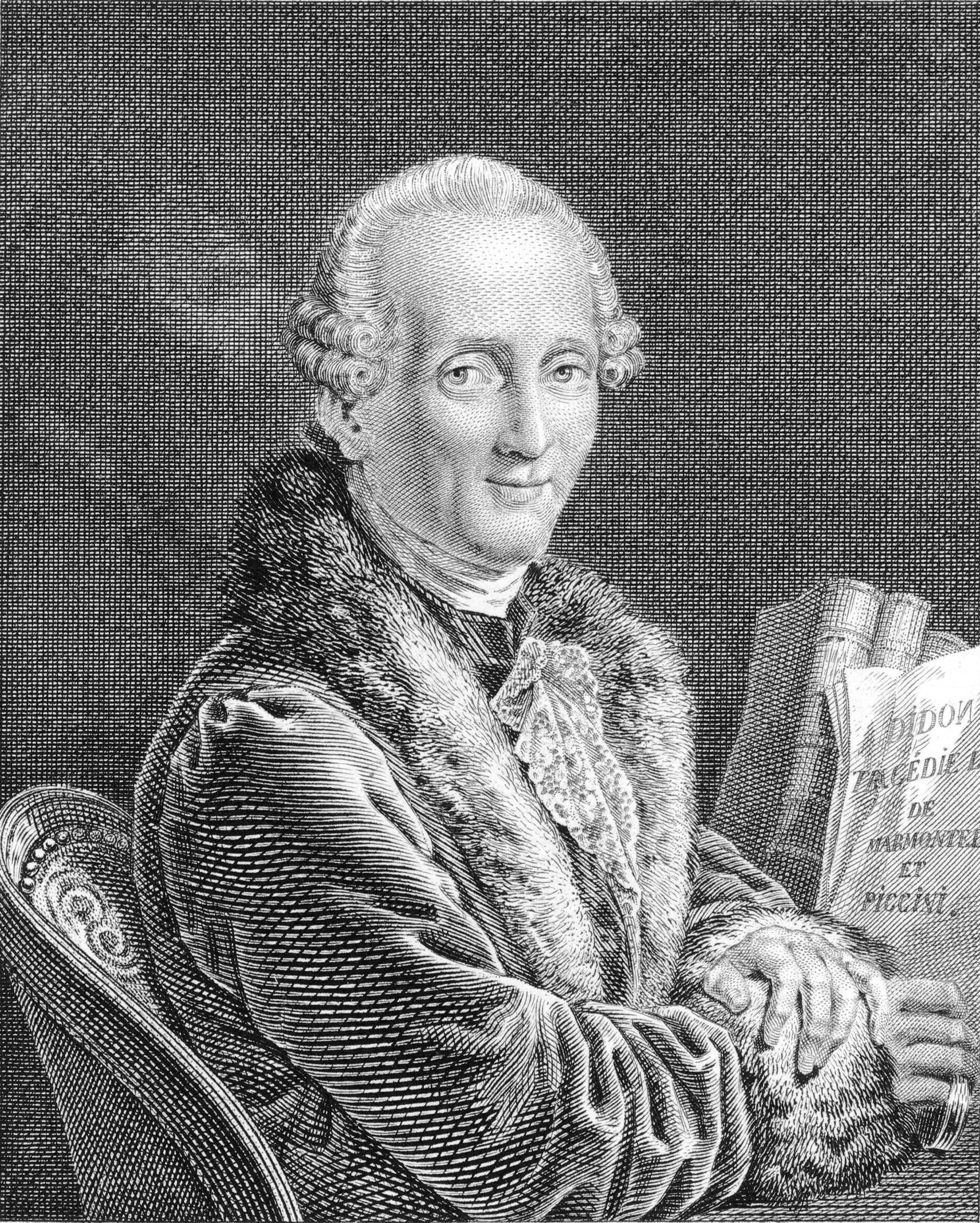
Niccolò Piccinni

Niccolò Piccinni (Italian: [nikkoˈlɔ ppitˈtʃinni]; 16 January 1728 – 7 May 1800) was an Italian composer of symphonies, sacred music, chamber music, and opera. Although somewhat obscure today, Piccinni was at one time one of the most popular opera composers — particularly of the Neapolitan opera buffa — of the Classical period of music of the mid- to late-18th century.

== Life ==
Piccinni was born in Bari, in the Apulia region of Italy. From the age of fourteen, he was educated at the Conservatory of San Onofrio by Leonardo Leo and Francesco Durante, due to the intervention of the Bishop of Bari. His father, although himself a musician, was opposed to his son following the same career.

Piccinni's first opera, Le donne dispettose, was produced in 1755 with the patronage of Prince Vintimille.

In 1756, Piccinni married a pupil of his, singer Vincenza Sibilla; he never allowed her to appear on the stage after their marriage.

In 1760 Piccinni composed, at Rome, the chef d'œuvre of his early life, La Cecchina, ossia la buona Figliuola, an opera buffa with a libretto by Carlo Goldoni, which "enjoyed a two-year run in Rome and was played in all the important European capitals. It can probably be called the most popular opera buffa of the 18th century...[even more than]... Pergolesi's La serva padrona...[and]... The first of the new era, culminating in the masterworks of Mozart."

La buona figliuola represented a special moment in the history of eighteenth-century music, in which comedy began to take on a new dramatic force. It was the moment at which the self-consciously sentimental theatrical project of Carlo Goldoni (the opera's librettist) was married with the developing musical language of classicism. This can especially be seen in the sensitive writing of Cecchina's act 2 aria "Una povera ragazza".

The opera was such a success that clothing fashions, shops, and houses were all named after La Cecchina. It also set off a debate about the merits of the new sentimental style, especially in England, where conservative reactionaries were wary of the supposed feminizing influence of modern Italian music. Antonio Baretti commented in 1768 that individuals “of weight and consideration” should not be blamed for condemning “those puny gentlemen” who, as enthusiasts of Italian opera, were able to “feel its minuet niceties, and to be of course in rapture with the languishing Cecchina’s of Piccini [sic].” This modern music, Baretti decried, “far from having any power of increasing courage or any manly virtues, has on the contrary a tendency towards effeminacy and cowardliness.”

Six years after this, Piccinni was invited by Queen Marie Antoinette to Paris, where he became the first Italian after Jean-Baptiste Lully to write operas for the Academie royale de musique (the Paris Opera). He collaborated with the poet and dramatist Jean-François Marmontel on several projects designed to advance the cause of the operatic reform. Marmontel's first librettos took as their foundation texts Philippe Quinault had written for Lully, Roland 1778, and Atys, 1779. Subsequent works, starting with Didon, used original texts.

All of Piccinni's later works were successful, but the directors of the Grand Opera conceived the idea of deliberately opposing him to Christoph Willibald Gluck, persuading the two composers to treat the same subject – Iphigénie en Tauride – simultaneously. The Parisian public was divided into two rival parties, which, under the names of Gluckists and Piccinnists, carried on an unworthy and disgraceful war. Gluck's masterly Iphigénie en Tauride was first produced on 18 May 1779. Piccinni's Iphigénie followed on 23 January 1781. The antagonism of the rival parties continued, even after Gluck left Paris in 1780; and an attempt was afterwards made to inaugurate a new rivalry with Sacchini.

Piccinni remained popular, and on the death of Gluck, in 1787, it was proposed that a public monument be erected to Gluck's memory – a suggestion which the Gluckists refused to support.

In 1784, Piccinni became professor at the Royal School of Music, one of the institutions from which the Conservatoire was formed in 1794. During the outbreak of the French Revolution in 1789, Piccinni returned to Naples, where he was at first well-received by King Ferdinand IV; the marriage of his daughter Claire to a French democrat named Pierre Prades-Prestreau, however, brought him disgrace. He was accused of being a revolutionary and placed under house arrest for four years. For the next nine years, Piccinni maintained a precarious existence in Venice, Naples and Rome. In 1798, he returned to Paris, where the public received him with enthusiasm, but he made no money.

During his life, he worked with the greatest librettists of his age, including Metastasio. After his death a memorial tablet was set up in the house in which he was born at Bari.

Niccolò Piccinni died in Passy, France, near Paris, on 7 May 1800.

A grandson of Niccolo and Vicenza, Louis Alexandre Piccinni, became a successful repetiteur and composer in Paris.

== Works ==
The most complete list of his works was given in the Rivista Musicale Italiana, VIII, of 1901.

=== Operas ===
Piccinni produced over a hundred operas, but although his later work shows the influence of the French and German stage, he belongs to the conventional Italian school of the 18th century.

=== Non-operatic works ===
Piccinni also wrote a number of sacred works, for voices with various accompanying forces, and also two symphonies (in D major and in G major) and a flute concerto.

== See also ==
- Les Neuf Sœurs

== Notes ==
=== Further reading ===
- Chisholm, Hugh, ed. (1911). "Piccinni, Niccola" . Encyclopædia Britannica (11th ed.). Cambridge University Press.
- Holmes, William C. (October 1952). "Pamela Transformed". The Musical Quarterly. 38 (4): 581–594. doi:10.1093/mq/xxxviii.4.581.
- Pierre-Louis Ginguené, Notice sur la vie et les ouvrages de Niccolo Piccinni (Paris, 1801).
