= Théodore Lajarte =

French musicologist, librarian and composer (1826-1890)

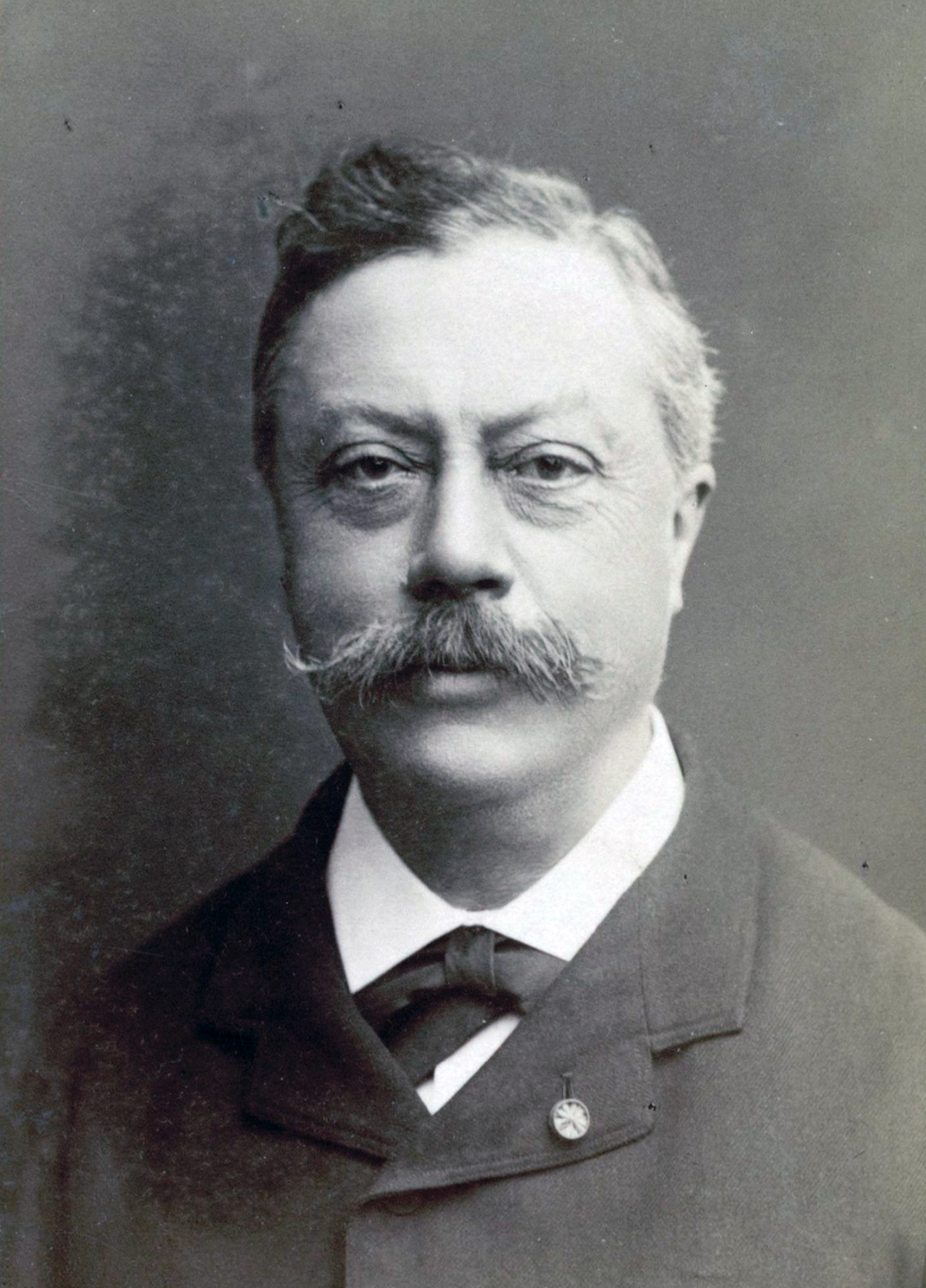
Théodore Lajarte

Théodore Lajarte (10 July 1826 – 20 June 1890) was a French musicologist, librarian, and composer.

== Early years and education ==
Lajarte was born in Bordeaux. His full name has been given as Théodore Édouard Dufaure de Lajarte. He studied at the Conservatoire de Paris under Aimé Leborne and soon thereafter composed a large number of operettas, none of which have survived.

== Librarian and musicologist ==
He is best remembered for his position as an archivist at the Paris Opera. After his appointment in 1873 as second librarian at the Paris Opera Library, he organized the theatre's historical scores and parts, publishing a chronological inventory of scores under the title Bibliothèque musicale du théâtre de l'Opéra in 1876 with a corrected and completed edition in 1878. He continued working at the library until 1890. As a musicologist, he contributed articles on music to newspapers and published reductions for piano and singing of old French operas and ballets, with the first being a reduction of Lully's opera Thésée. Overall sixty-two books in nine series under the title Chefs-d’œuvre classiques de l’opéra français were issued.

== Composer ==
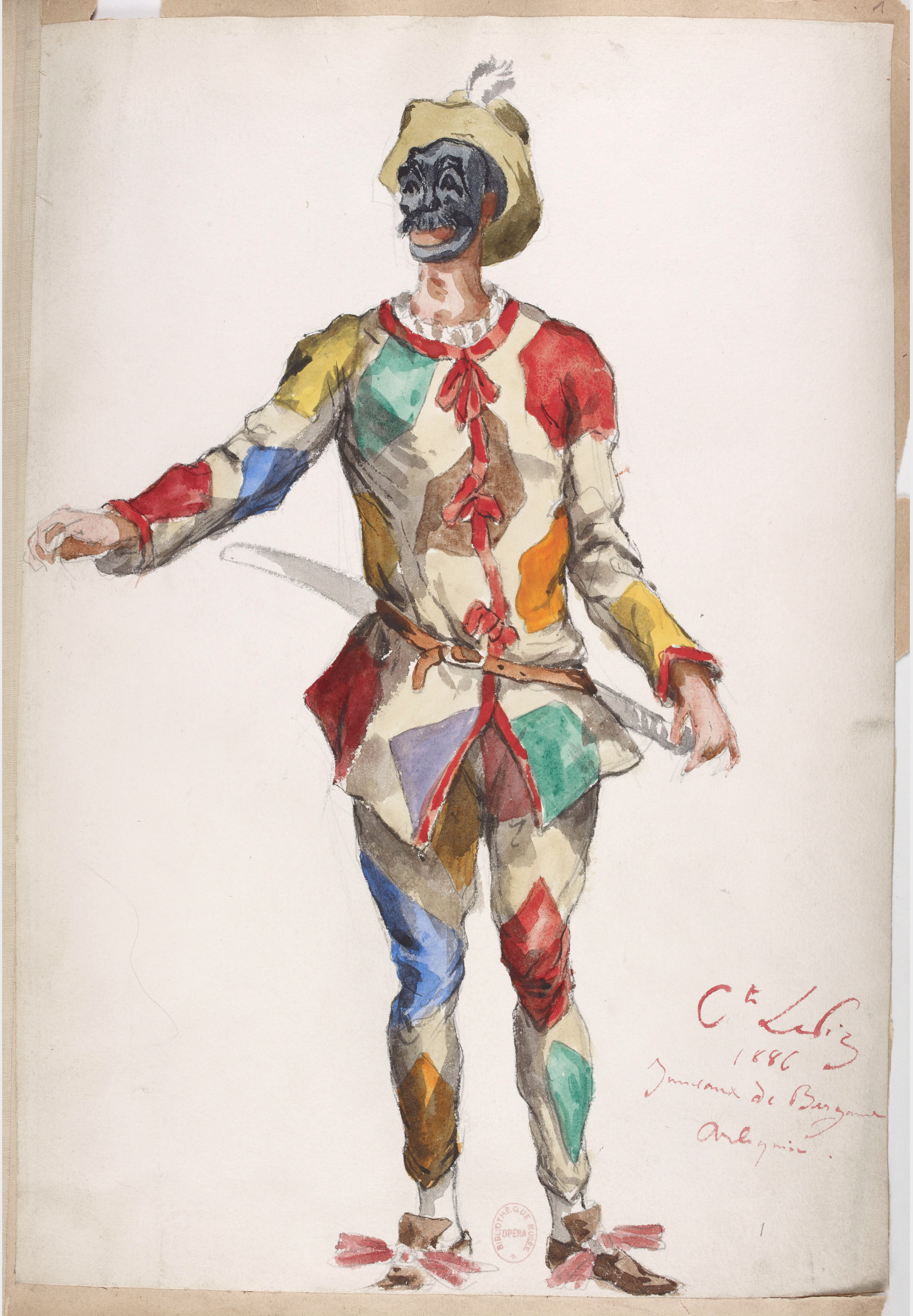
Costume design by Ludovic Lepic for Harlequin in Lajarte's ballet Les Jumeaux de Bergame

He was a composer of several works for the theater, including Monsieur de Floridor, a one-act opéra comique in two tableaux, lyrics by Charles Nuitter and Étienne Tréfeu after Louis Anseaume, first performed on 11 October 1880 by the Opéra-Comique at the second Salle Favart with Belhomme (Mathurin), Grivot (Floridor) and Mlle Ducasse (Thérèse). He gave the Opéra the one-act ballet-pantomime Les Jumeaux de Bergame, first performed on 26 January 1886 at the Palais Garnier, with words after Florian by Nuitter and Mérante and choreography by Mérante, with Mlle Subra (Caroline), very well received. His other works include Le Secret de l’Oncle Vincent (24 November 1855, Théâtre Lyrique), Mam’zelle Pénélope (3 November 1859, Théâtre Lyrique), Le Neveu de Gulliver (22 October 1861, Théâtre Lyrique), Le Portrait (18 June 1883, Opéra-Comique) and Le Roi de Carreau (26 October 1883, Théâtre des Nouveautés).

Lajarte died in Paris at the age of 63 and is buried at Montmartre Cemetery.

== Sources ==
- Ferrari, Gustave and Marie Louise Pereyra (1954). "Lajarte, Théodore (Édouard Dufaure) de", vol. 5, p. 18, in Grove's Dictionary of Music and Musicians, fifth edition, edited by Eric Blom. New York, St. Martin's Press. OCLC 13586086.
- Huebner, Steven (1992). "Lajarte, Théodore (Édouard Dufaure de)", vol. 2, p. 1081, in The New Grove Dictionary of Opera, edited by Stanley Sadie. London: Macmillan. ISBN 9781561592289.
- Lajarte, Théodore (1878). Bibliothèque musicale du Théâtre de l'Opéra, two volumes, corrected edition. Paris: Librairie des Bibliophiles. Volumes 1 [1671–1791] and 2 [1793–1876] at HathiTrust; volumes 1[1671–1791] and 2 [1793–1876] at Gallica.
- Lavignac, Albert and Lionel de La Laurencie (1931). Encyclopédie de la musique et dictionnaire du Conservatoire, Paris, C. Delagrave, vol.3, pp. 1788–9 "Théodore de Lajarte (1826–1890)".
- Pitou, Spire (1990). The Paris Opéra: An Encyclopedia of Operas, Ballets, Composers, and Performers. Growth and Grandeur, 1815–1914. New York: Greenwood Press. ISBN 9780313262180.
