= Pierre-Antoine Demachy =

French painter

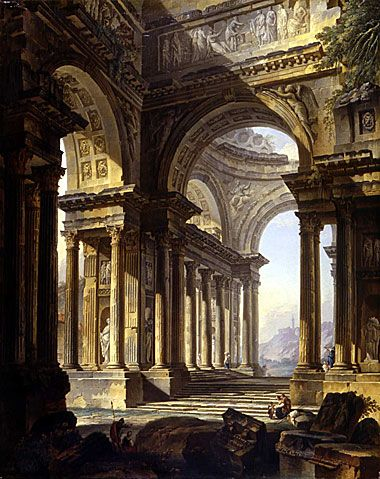
A Temple in Ruins

Pierre-Antoine Demachy (17 September 1723 – 10 September 1807) was a French artist who specialized in painting ruins, Trompe-l'œil architectural decorations and imaginative scenes of Paris.

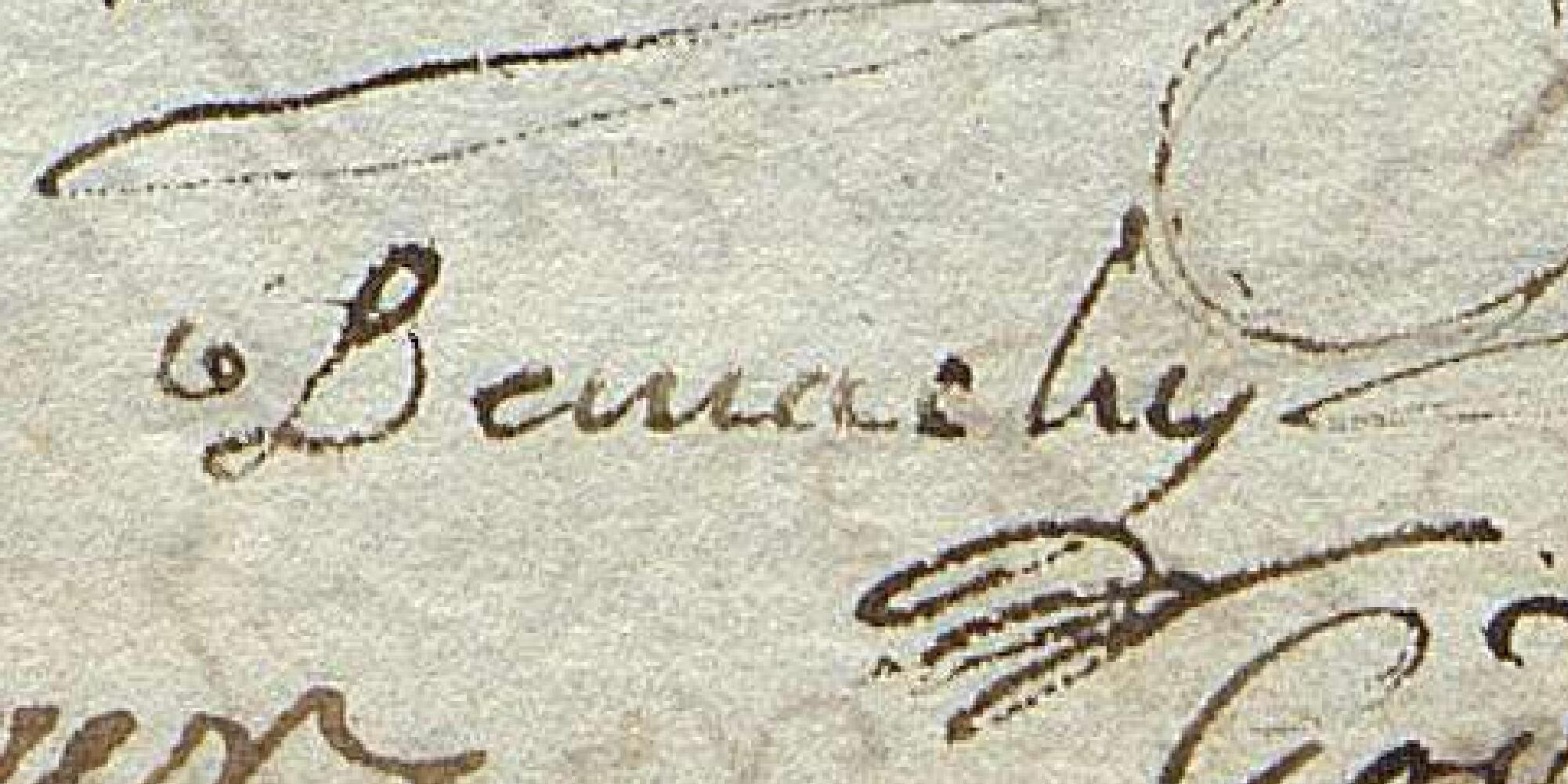

== Biography ==
Demachy was born in Paris as the son of a carpenter. In 1754, he became a student of the scenographer Giovanni Niccolò Servandoni and, the following year, was certified as a "Painter of Architecture" by the Académie royale de peinture et de sculpture. In 1757, he held his first exhibit at the Salon and continued to display his works there until 1802. He began teaching at the Académie soon after.

In 1764, his trompe-l'œil paintings for the façade of the new Church of Sainte-Geneviève (now the Panthéon) earned him an appointment as the decorator of stage sets for the Menus-Plaisirs du Roi. Four years later, the Russian Ambassador in Paris presented him with a commission for several tableaux from Catherine the Great.

Upon the death of Jean-François Amand, Demachy was assigned his workshop in the Palais du Louvre. His classes were so popular that, in 1777, the Comte d'Angiviller wrote a letter to the Académie's Director, Jean-Baptiste Marie Pierre, complaining that Demachy's students were "polluting the corridors" of the Louvre. Ironically, six years later, Pierre asked the Comte to write a letter to Demachy, informing him that he had been granted an annual pension of 500 Livres. In 1784, Demachy took up residence on the first floor of the Louvre.

The following year, he applied for and received the position of Professor of Perspective, recently left vacant by the death of Jacques Sébastien Leclerc. He would hold that office, with some interruptions, until his own death in 1807.

He apparently weathered the Revolution with no serious consequences. In 1793 and 1794, he was appointed a Deputy to the "Commune Générale des Arts" which temporarily replaced the Académie. He dutifully created a work depicting the "Burning of Feudal Titles and the Attributes of Tyranny".

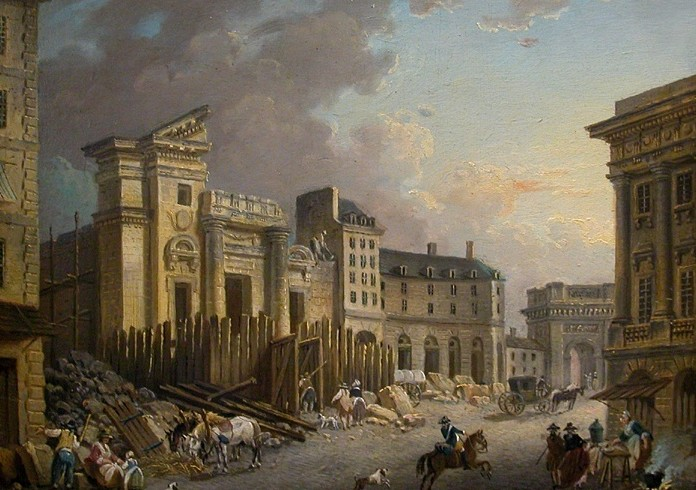
Demolition of the Church of Saint-Barthélemy (1791)

His wife, Louise, died in 1799. His son, Gilles-Pierre, a painter of little note, died two years later. Demachy died in Paris on 10 September 1807.
