= Denis-Pierre-Jean Papillon de la Ferté =

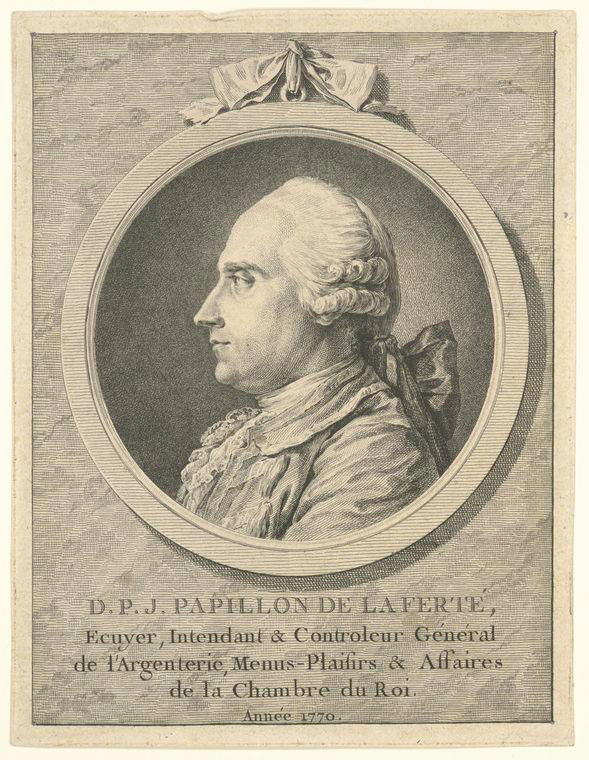
Portrait of Denis Pierre Jean Papillon de la Ferté by Adolphe Varin

Denis-Pierre-Jean Papillon de la Ferté (Châlons-en-Champagne 17 February 1727 — Paris 7 July 1794) was an amateur draughtsman, designer and print collector; an art critique and connoisseur. As the administrator (an Intendant and from 1763 the sole Intendant) of the Menus-Plaisirs du Roi, the organization in the royal household (the Maison du Roi) he was responsible for the logistical aspects of his the travels, maintenance of the palaces, design and presentation of fêtes and ceremonies, fireworks, balls, ballets, weddings and funerals, furniture, jewelry at the court of France, beginning with his appointment in 1756.

== Life ==
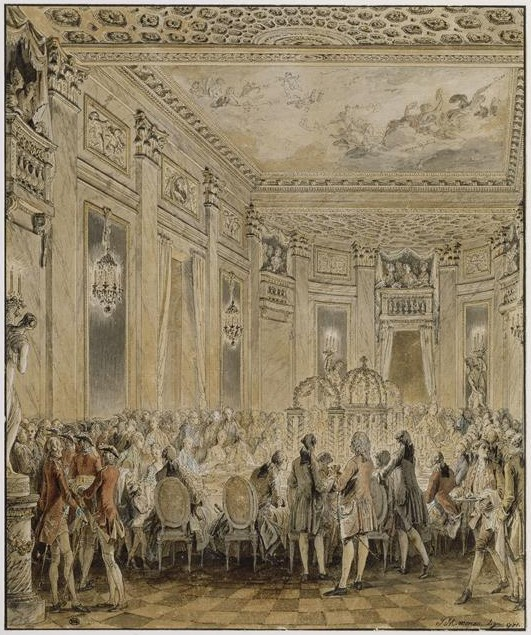
J.M. Moreau - Souper donné à Louveciennes

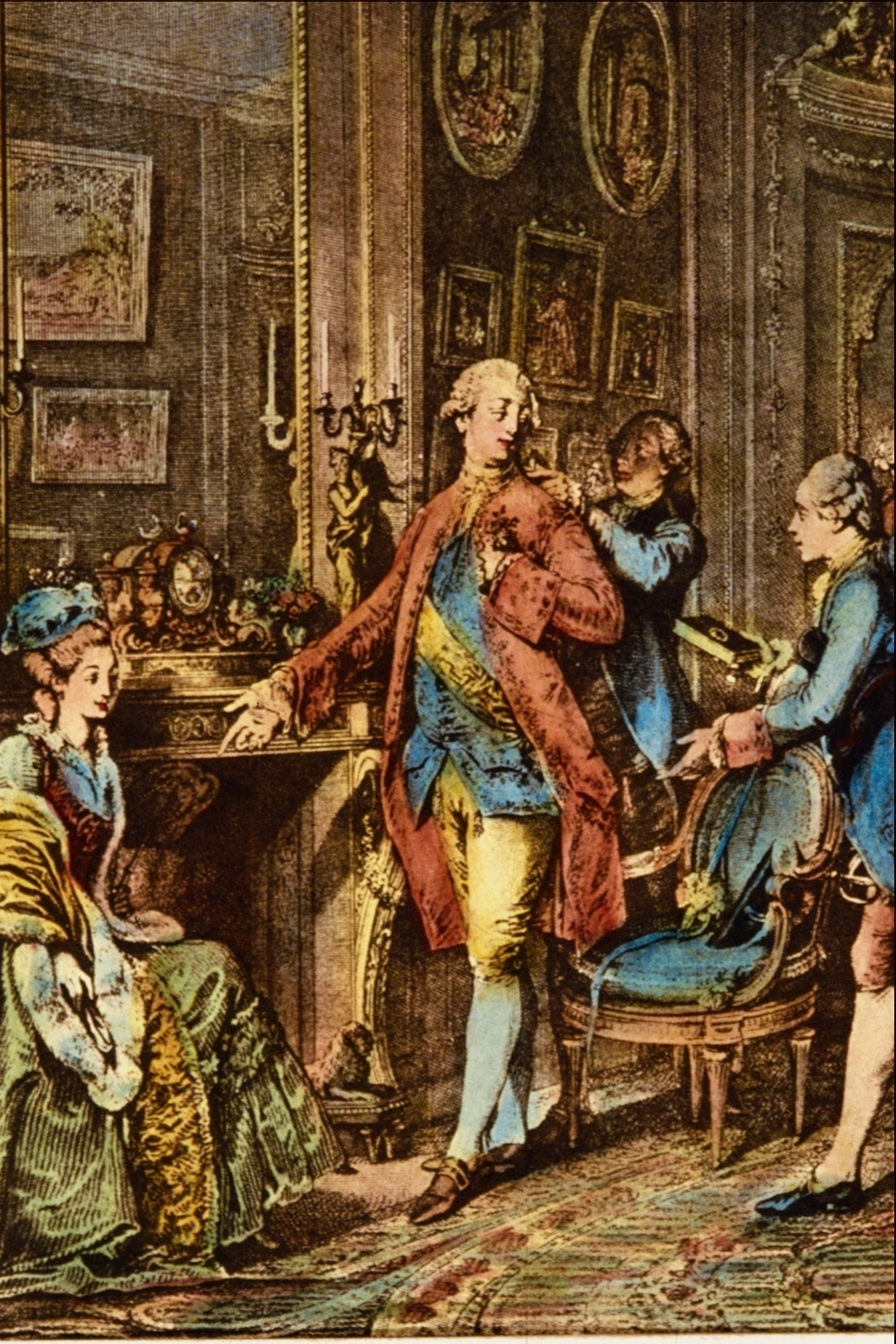
La Grande Toilette - Jean-Michel Moreau

He was the son of Pierre Papillon de la Ferté (ca. 1682–1753), seigneur de la Ferté, président trésorier of the généralité of Champagne (province), the King's Lieutenant of Châlons. He was invited at the Académie des Sciences of Châlons, of the Société des Antiquaires of Kassel, and plays an important role in the history of 18th-century French opera. He succeeded Michel de Bonneval as intendant of the Menus-Plaisirs du Roi.

His remarkable longevity in a position that was concentrated in his person in 1762, spanning two reigns and the change in taste from rococo (Louis XV) to neoclassicism (Louis XVI), in music as well as the visual arts, is testament to his ability and character. His Journal, published in 1887, gives an insight not only into the workings of the Menus-Plaisirs, but the Comédie française and the Comédie-Italienne, and also the music at court and the Théâtre du Palais-Royal, and the Intendant 's role, reforming, rationalizing and redefining the official structure, encouraging artists of every kind, the model of the modern arts administrator.

He was inspired to keep the journal by which he is intimately known in support of his possible future self-defence, a "preservative against the Bastille" as he would jokingly remark to the Premiers Gentilhommes de la Chambre to whom he reported, reassuring them that otherwise it would never see the light of day, for he entered his position following the scandal of malfeasance of his predecessor, M. de Curis?

He developed many projects for the second Théâtre du Palais-Royal after April 1763. In 1770, Gluck signed a contract for six stage works with the management of the theatre which opened in January 1770. For the wedding of Louis XVI and Marie Antoinette many plays were performed; the costs very high. The theatre continued to be used by the Opera until June 1781, when it too was destroyed by fire. His office Garde Meuble moved to fr:Hôtel des Menus-Plaisirs (Paris) in 1774. From 1780 he was also Director of the Académie Royale de Music, was opposed to the queen's predilection for foreign music. It was less than ten years since Gluck had succeeded in breaking the century-old monopoly French (or naturalised French) had exercised over the repertoire of the Opéra. He even suggested Joseph Legros alone was qualified to fill the vacant directorship of the theatre. Papillon de la Ferté's suggestion, however, met with opposition from the rest of the committee and remained a dead letter. Antoine Dauvergne's correspondence with Papillon de La Ferté, published and made accessible online. He protected Francois Lays in the 1780s at the time of his quarrels with Dauvergne. In 1781 — after the Compte rendu was published — Saint Georges's Concert des Amateurs had to be disbanded due to a lack of funding. (Note: France had high debts accrued from the American Revolution.)

He lived in a grand townhouse and had a country house on île Saint Denis. In 1790 he joined the garde nationale, notwithstanding he became a victim of the Reign of Terror; his aristocratic background made him a target, and he was arrested, imprisoned in the palais Luxembourg and accused of being an enemy of the people by Fouquier-Tinville. Papillon died under the guillotine on Place du Trône, three weeks before the fall of Robespierre. His son also became an intendant of the Menus-Plaisirs.

== Works ==
- In 1776 he published a book about French painters, Extrait des différens ouvrages publiés sur la vie des peintres and was interested in mathematiques and the building of fortifications.
- A folio with 119 costume designs made for Papillon de la Ferté is at the Bibliothèque de l'Institut (MS 1004).
- He was a keen collector of landscapes, mainly by François Boucher, Hubert Robert, Jean-Honoré Fragonard and Claude Joseph Vernet, from whom he commissioned a series of seven large decorative panels for his hôtel particulier.

After his execution his collection was seized, partly taken for the national collections and partly returned to his family, and sold in February 1797.

== Sources ==
- Gruber, Alain-Charles, Les Grandes Fêtes et leurs Décors à l'Époque de Louis XVI (Geneva: Droz) (Geneva) 1972. passim
- Journal de Papillon de la Ferté, intendant et contrôleur de l'argenterie, menus-plaisirs et affaires de la chambre du roi (1756-1780) Publié avec une introduction et des notes par Ernest Boysse.
- Pitou, Spire (1985). The Paris Opéra. An Encyclopedia of Operas, Ballets, Composers, and Performers – Rococo and Romantic, 1715–1815. Westport/London: Greenwood Press. ISBN 0-313-24394-8.
