= Pierre-Adrien Pâris =

French painter

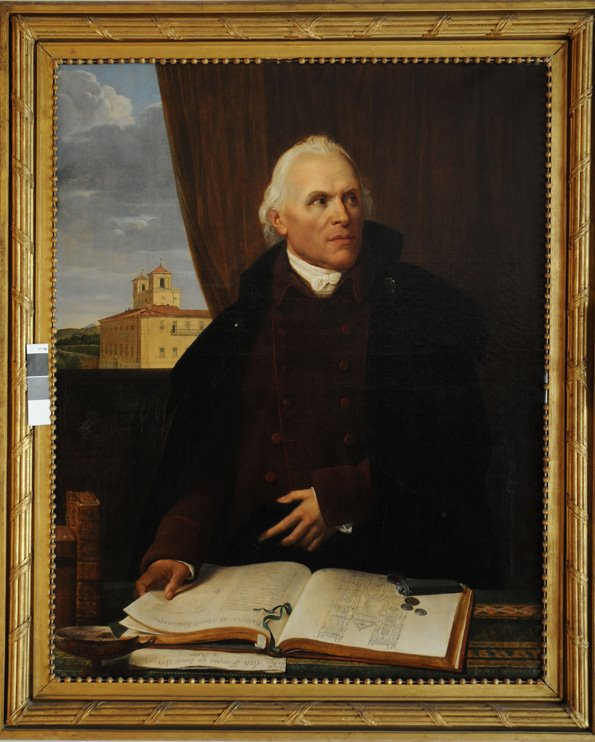
Portrait of Pierre-Adrien Pâris in 1812 by Joseph-François Ducq, Musée des Beaux-Arts de Besançon.

Pierre-Adrien Pâris (1745 – 1 August 1819) was a French architect, painter and designer.

== Biography ==
Pâris was born at Besançon, the son of an architect and official surveyor at the court of the Prince-Bishop of Basel. He went to Paris to study architecture in 1760; there he was particularly a student of Étienne-Louis Boullée and Louis-François Trouard at the École royale d'architecture. After failing three times to win the Prix de Rome, he visited Rome in 1769 to accompany his teacher's son as his tutor, and, at the recommendation of the grand connoisseur, Louis Marie Augustin, duc d'Aumont, was permitted to follow courses at the French Academy in Rome. He traveled in Italy, including visits to the Roman ruins of Pompeii, Herculaneum, and Paestum, of which he made many drawings and casts. He returned to France in 1774.

In 1775, Trouard entrusted him with the interior decoration of the Hôtel d'Aumont he was building in Place de la Concorde. In 1778, at the death of Michel-Ange Challe, Louis XVI appointed him King's Designer and Architect ("Dessinateur du Cabinet du Roi"). He worked on numerous decorative schemes for official events, theatrical performances and funerals, and also directed the decoration of the Paris Opera.

Appointed to the Académie royale d'architecture in 1780, from 1784 to 1790 he directed the construction of the magnificent town hall in Neuchâtel (Switzerland). In 1785, he built the Hôtel Depont des Granges in La Rochelle. Starting in 1787, for the Duchess of Bourbon, he worked on the interior layout of the Palais de l'Elysée, which virtually eliminated the scheme by his master Boullée, and also redesigned the English garden and built the group of cottages there called "hameau de Chantilly", which imitated garden folly built at Chantilly by the Prince de Condé. He rearranged the buildings and created the English garden of the Abbey of Valasse at Gruchet-le-Valasse (Seine). He also carried out a major neoclassical reconstruction project at the Château de Porrentruy.

Named in 1784 to a post created for him, architect of the Menus Plaisirs du Roi, he realised plans for the Estates-General of 1789 in the courtyard of the Hôtel des Menus Plaisirs (the workshop for the opera's sets), in the town of Versailles. He was charged by the National Assembly with redeveloping the courtyard into an amphitheatre with graded seating, and installing the same set of gradients in the Tuileries, divided into two, facing a podium. He was appointed architect to the Cathedral of Orléans in 1787 and completed its towers, just as the Revolution began, in 1790. His close friendship with the king, and his attachments with the most radical Enlightenment thinkers, caused him a serious moral crisis during the French Revolution, during which he declined any work offered him, and retired near Le Havre, at Colmoulins.

In 1806 he returned to Italy and the following year, he was acting director of the French Academy in Rome; he directed excavations at the Colosseum. He arranged the purchase for France and transport to Paris of the Borghese collection of antiquities. Following the Bourbon restoration he returned to France in 1817 and realised his plans for a monument to Louis XVI on the Place de la Concorde, which is the elliptical device with a declaration of the "Droits du Homme", which he had invented for the National Assembly at the Menus Plaisirs, and that Chateaubriand had incorporated without citing the author.

Pâris spent the last two years of his life preparing a catalogue of his collection of paintings and antiquities, which he bequeathed to the city of Besançon, together with his library, catalogued by his friend Charles Weiss.
