= Sébastien Slodtz =

Flemish sculptor and decorator

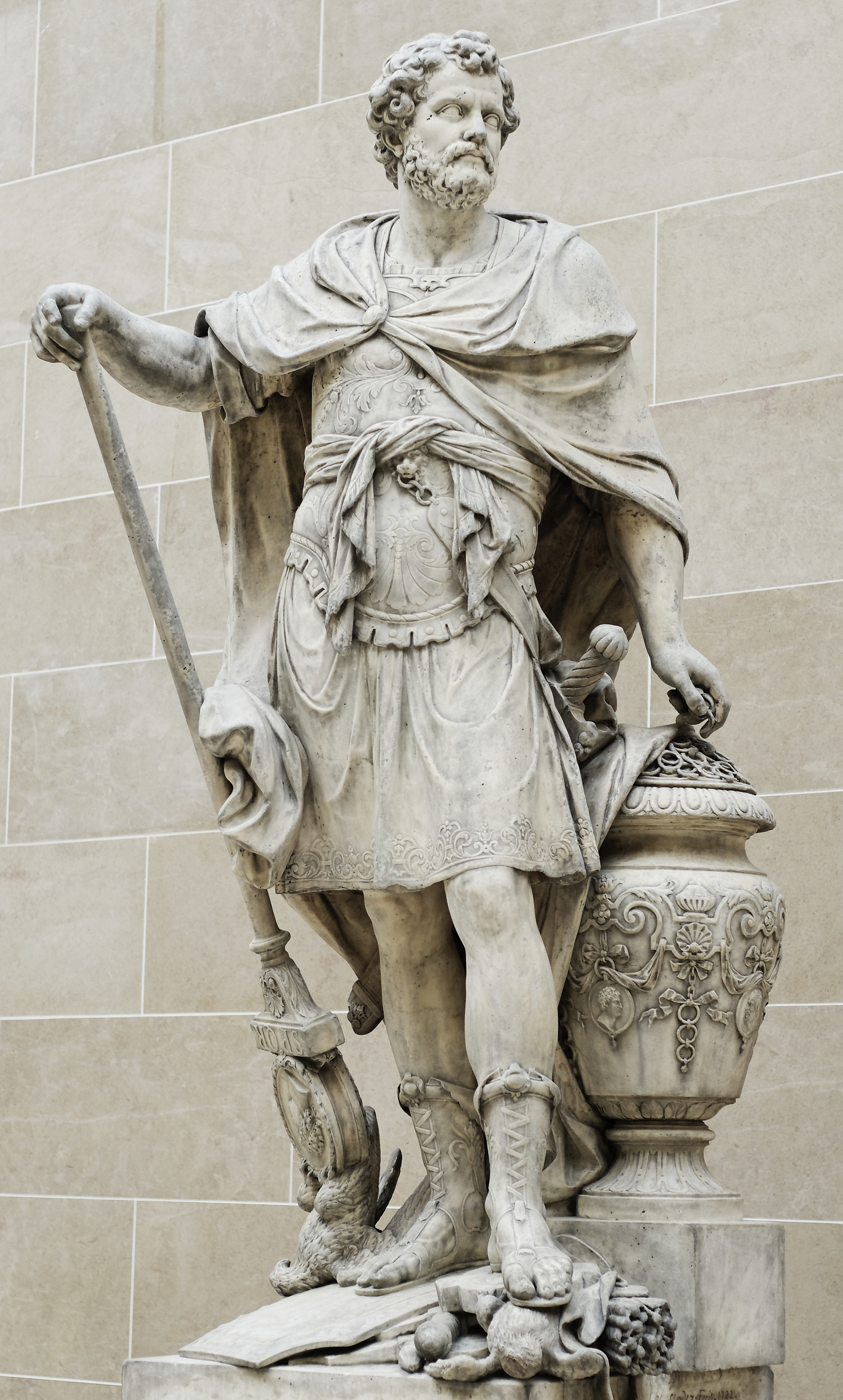
Hannibal counting the rings of the Roman knights killed at the Battle of Cannae, 1704 (Musée du Louvre)

Sebastiaen Slodtz (1655–1726), in France called Sébastien Slodtz, was a Flemish sculptor and decorator who after training in his native Antwerp, moved to France where he became a court sculptor to the King. He was the father of three sons who helped further shape official French sculpture between the Baroque and the Rococo.

== Life ==
He was born in Antwerp as the son of a master carpenter and Jacqueline de Lannoy. He moved to Paris in 1685. Here he joined the Paris workshop of François Girardon. Under Girardon's direction he worked for the sculptural decor of Versailles and its gardens and for the Tuileries. Sébastien Slodtz was the outstanding sculptor to come out of Girardon's atelier.

He married in 1692 Magdelaine (Madeleine) de Guichy (or Cucci), the daughter of Domenico Cucci, the gold- and silversmith to king Louis XIV. The couple had 13 children. His son René-Michel Slodtz (1705–64), nicknamed Michelange (i.e. Michelangelo), is regarded as the sole great sculptor in the Slodtz dynasty of artists. Two other sons worked in partnership largely for the ephemeral royal and princely occasions overseen by the organisation of the French royal household called the Menus-Plaisirs du Roi: the designer-decorator Sébastien-Antoine (1695–1754) and the sculptor Paul-Ambroise (1702–58), who was the only one of the sons to be accepted in the Académie royale de peinture et de sculpture. Their lively, dashing drawings cannot be told apart, even by specialists. Two further brothers, Jean-Baptiste Slodtz and Dominique-François were painters, the former becoming a peintre ordinaire to the Duke of Orléans and the latter also working for the Menus-Plaisirs. His daughter Maria Francisca (Marie-Françoise) Slodtz, married the Flemish painter Carel van Falens on 16 July 1716.

He was appointed to the post of Dessinateur de la Chambre et du Cabinet de Sa Majesté, which meant he was in charge of the orderly production of the designs for the Menus-Plaisirs. Two of his sons filled this post after him. He also became rector of the Académie de Saint-Luc, the Paris guild of painters and sculptors.

Among the pupils of Sébastien Slodtz was Pierre de L'Estache.

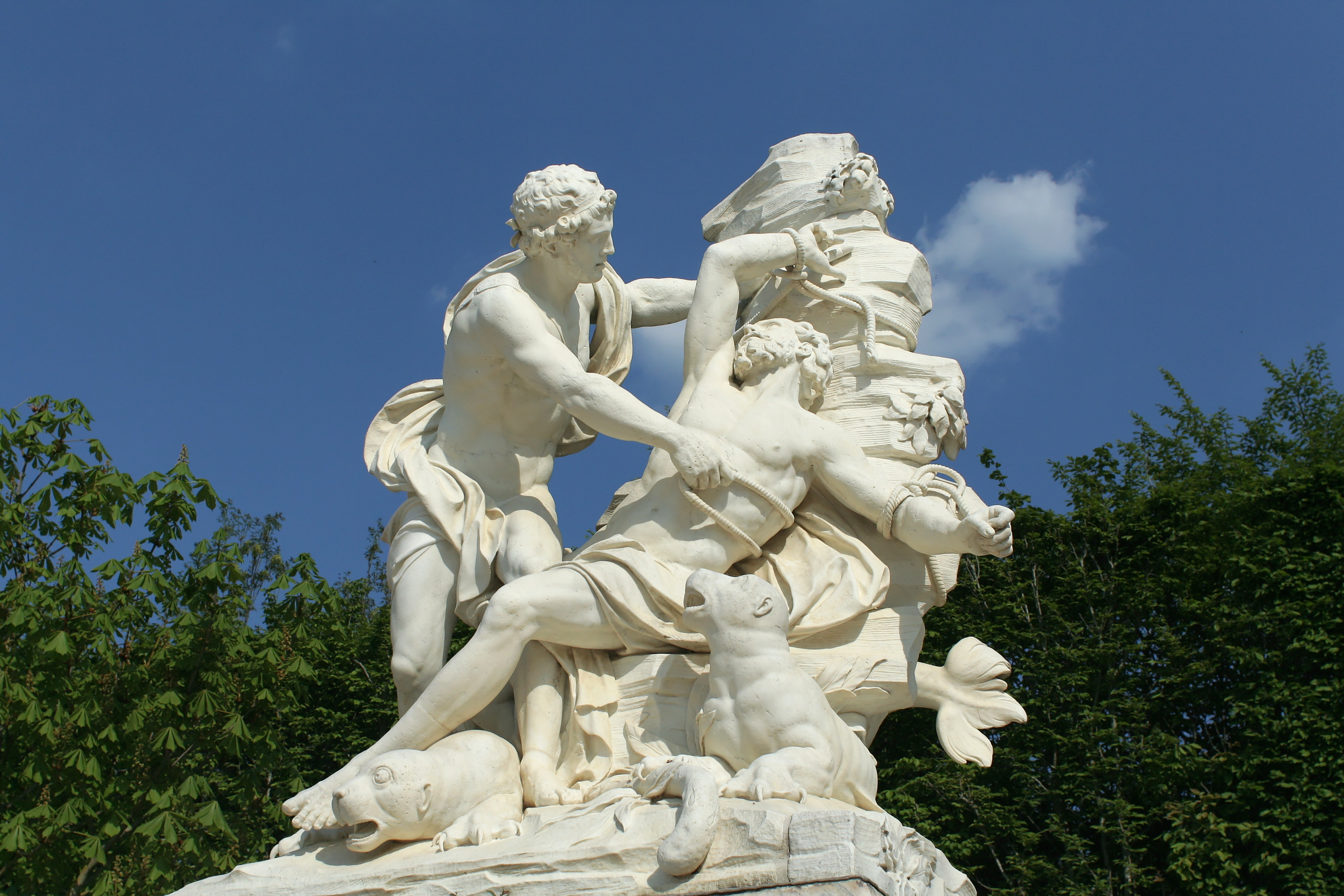
Aristaeus fettering Proteus

He died on 9 May 1726 in his lodgings in the Louvre in Paris.

== Work ==
Sébastien Slodtz was a prolific sculptor and ornamental designer. He worked on a number of commissions in the gardens of Versailles including for a marble vase for the allée royale and decorations for the chapel of the Virgin and the chapel of St Louis. He worked also on the ephemeral decoration for funerals organised by the Menus-Plaisirs at the Notre Dame and the abbey of Saint-Denis.

His best-known work is the Aristaeus fettering Proteus, begun in 1688 and installed in 1714 in the Bassin d'Apollon on the grand terrace at Versailles, where it is still in situ. His other chief works were the Hannibal counting the rings of the Roman knights killed at the Battle of Cannae for the allée royale at Versailles. It was designed as a pendant for Nicolas Coustou's Julius Caesar. Girardon made a terracotta model on the basis of which Slodtz executed the larger work. He also made a statue of St Ambrose in the Dôme des Invalides, and a bas-relief Saint Louis sending missionaries to India. Other works were provided for the Château de Marly, such as the marble Vertumnus for the Cascade and sculptures for the Val-de-Grâce.

The secret council chamber in Elector Max Emanuel's parade apartment at Nymphenburg Palace contains an ensemble by Slodtz. It includes a fireplace with a white marble overmantel featuring multi-coloured inlay, along with matching tabletops for two consoles commissioned by the Elector in 1719.
