= Charles François Hutin =

French painter (1715-1776)

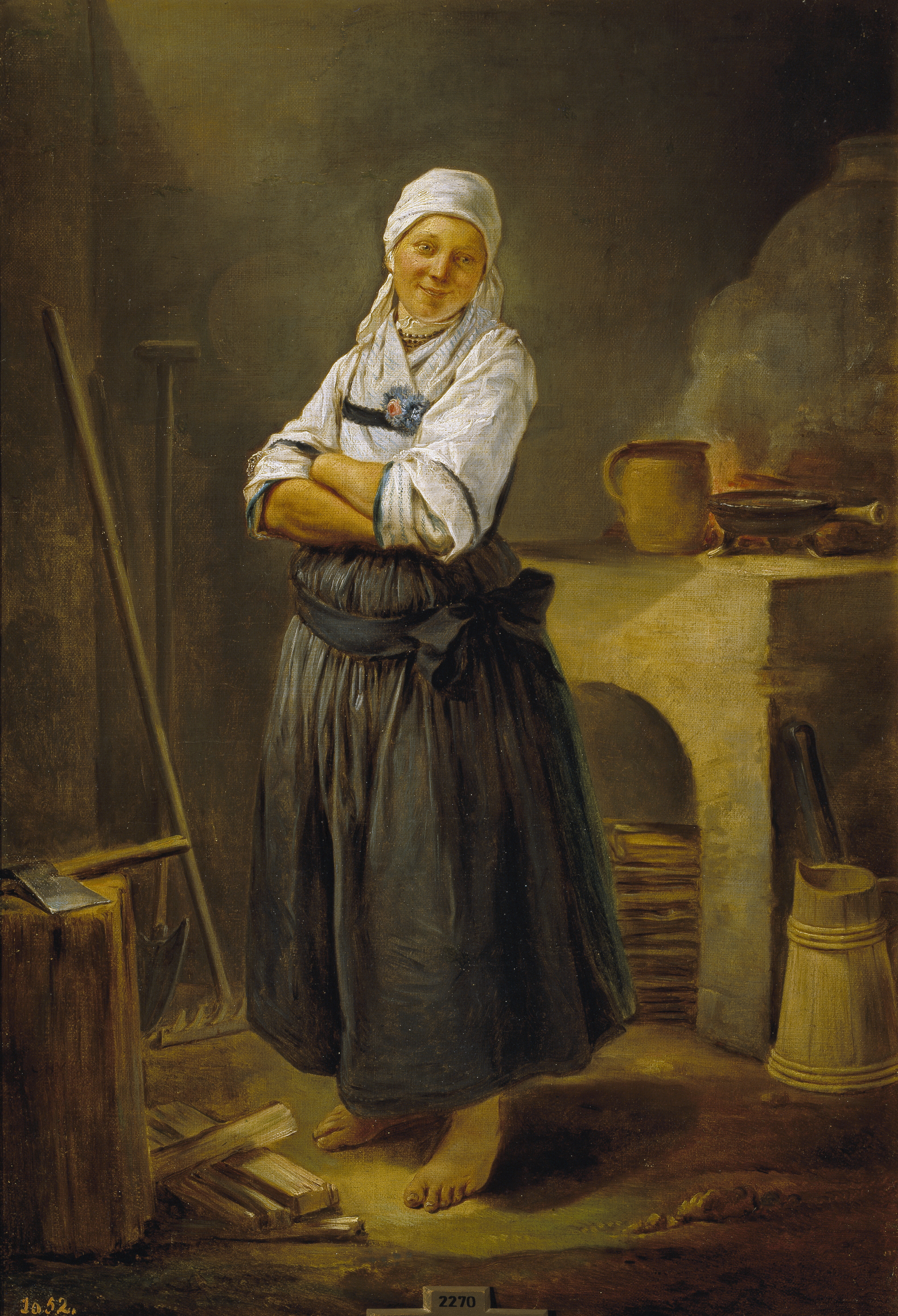
Saxon villager

Charles François Hutin (4 July 1715 – 29 July 1776) was a French history and figure painter, engraver and sculptor. He became director of the Royal Academy of Arts in Dresden.

== Life and work ==
Hutin was born in Paris in 1715. He studied painting under Francois Le Moine, and in his twenty-first year obtained the grand prize for historical painting, and went to Rome, where he spent seven years. There he studied sculpture with René-Michel Slodtz.

After his return to Paris in 1746, he was received into the Royal Academy. To gain admission he executed a sculpture as his presentation piece ("morceau de reception") and this attracted the attention of the Elector of Saxony, who invited him to come to Dresden in 1748; he went there with his brother Pierre Hutin. There, he made copies of the paintings in the gallery which were published in two volumes called 'Dresden Gallery (1753–57); his brother, Pierre, also contributed some drawings. The plates for this publication were engraved in Paris between 1750 and 1756 and over 20 engravers contributed.

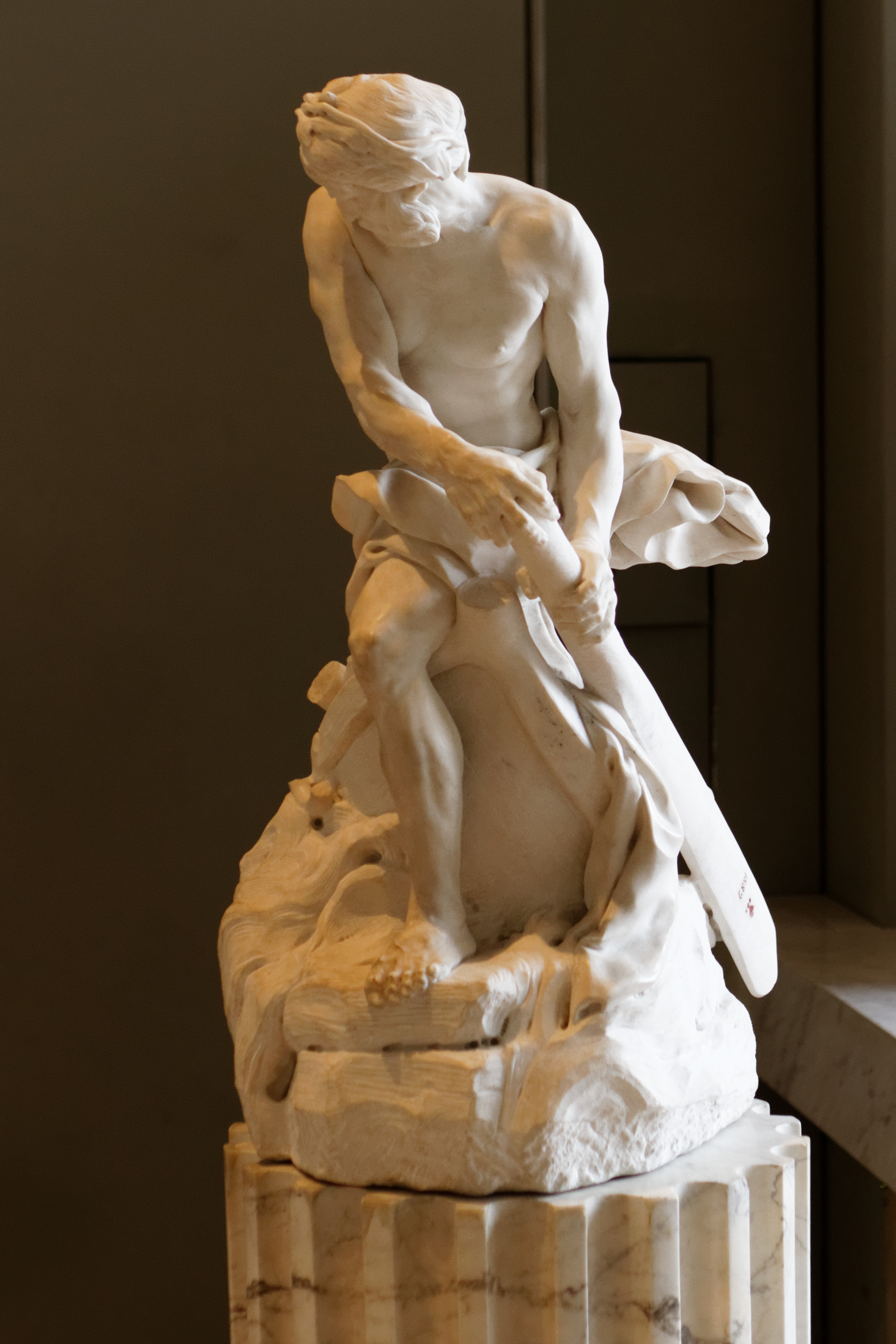
Charon, the ferryman of Hades

In 1764, he became director of the Dresden Royal Academy of Arts. He executed an altar painting of the crucifixion in the Katholische Hofkirche in Dresden, and, in one of the chapels behind the main altar, a fresco ceiling.

He published his graphic works in 35 plates under the title Recueil de différents sujets composés et gravés par Charles Hutin à Dresden in Dresden in 1763.

Hutin died in Dresden on 29 July 1776.

== Sources ==
- Louis-Étienne Dussieux, Les Artistes français à l'étranger (Paris; Lyon, Jacques Lecoffre, 1876) pp. 89–91.

Attribution:
