= Joseph-François Ducq =

Belgian Portrait Painter

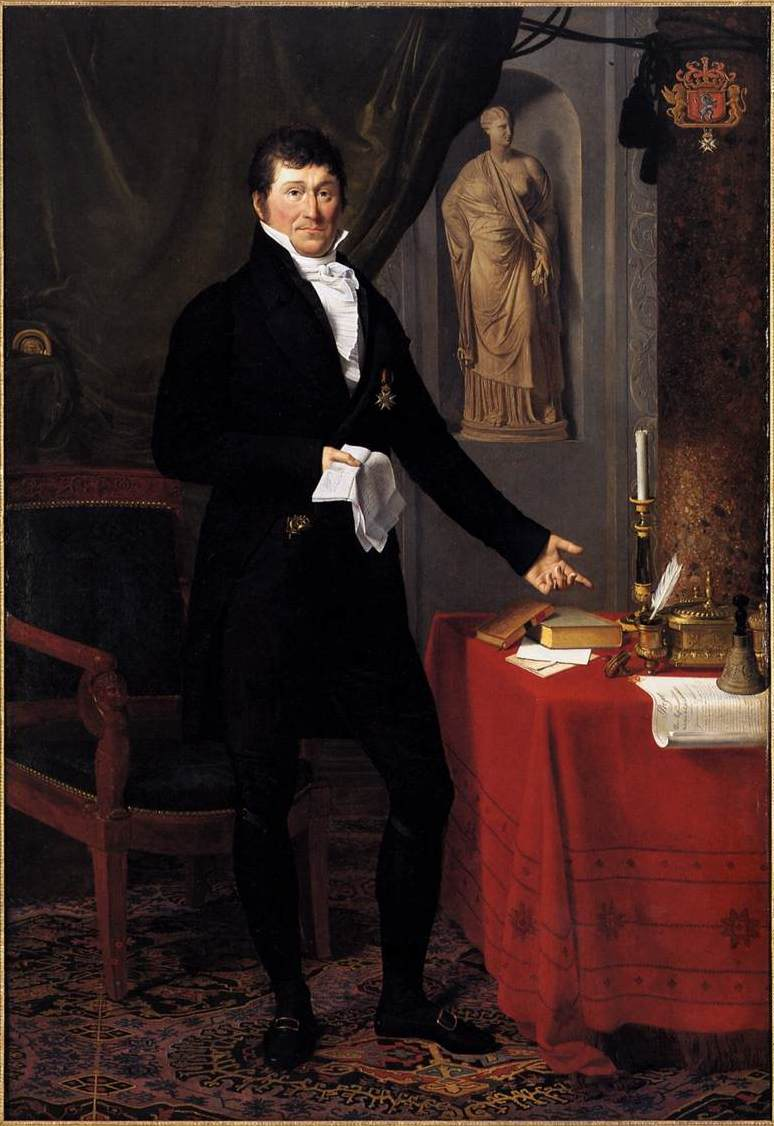
Baron Charles-Louis de Keverberg de Kessel, 1818, now in the Groeningemuseum in Bruges

Joseph-François Ducq, a Flemish historical and portrait painter, was born at Ledeghem in 1763. He studied at Bruges, and then under Suvée in Paris, where he obtained the second grand prize in 1800, and a medal in 1810. He also spent a considerable time in Italy, but returned to Bruges in 1815, and became a professor in the Academy. He died at Bruges in 1829. Amongst his chief works are:

- Meleager. 1804.
- Devotion of a Scythian. 1810.
- Marriage of Angelica and Medora. 1812.
- Venus emerging from the Sea. (Brussels Museum)
- William I., King of the Netherlands. (Bruges Academy.)
- Van Gierdergom. (Bruges Academy.)
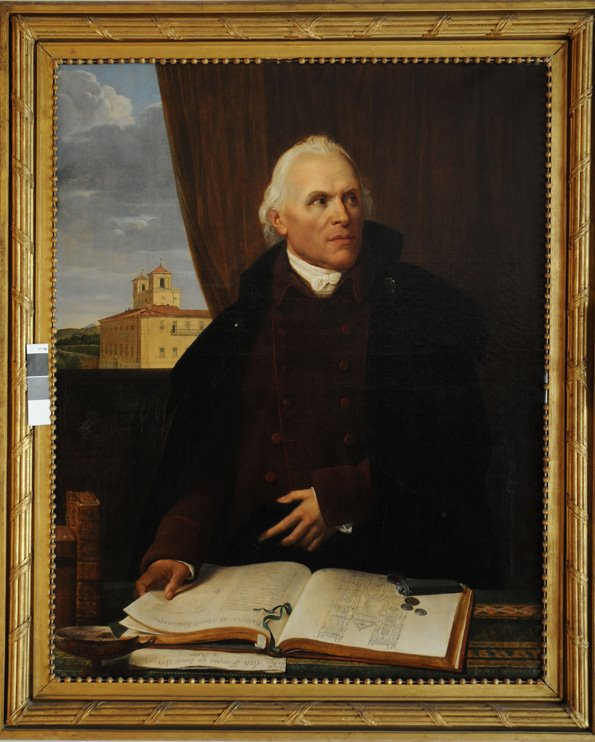
Pierre-Adrien Pâris, 1812, now in the Musée des Beaux-Arts et d'archéologie de Besançon

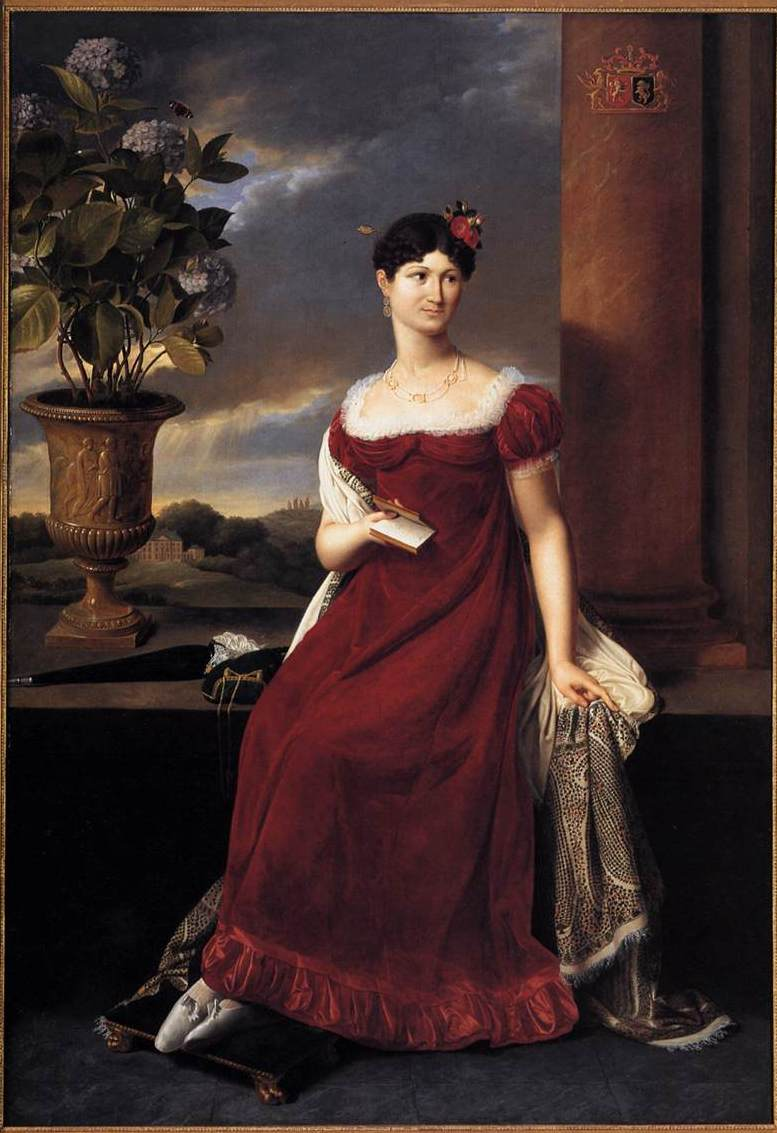
Mary Lodge, Bride of Baron Charles-Louis de Keverberg de Kessel, 1818 (forms a pair with the portrait of the baron)

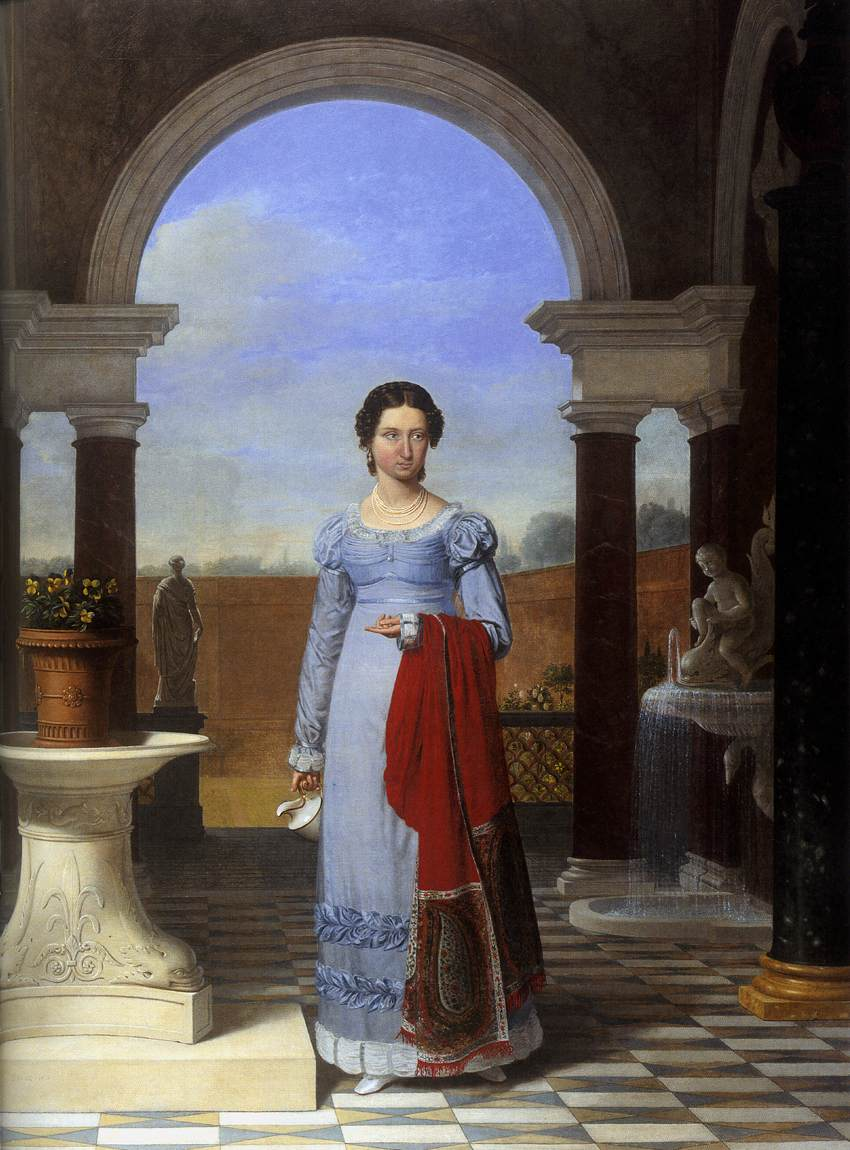
Portrait of Colette Versavel, Wife of Isaac J. de Meyer, 1822, now in the Museum of Fine Arts, Ghent
