= Carel van Falens =

Flemish painter (1683–1733)

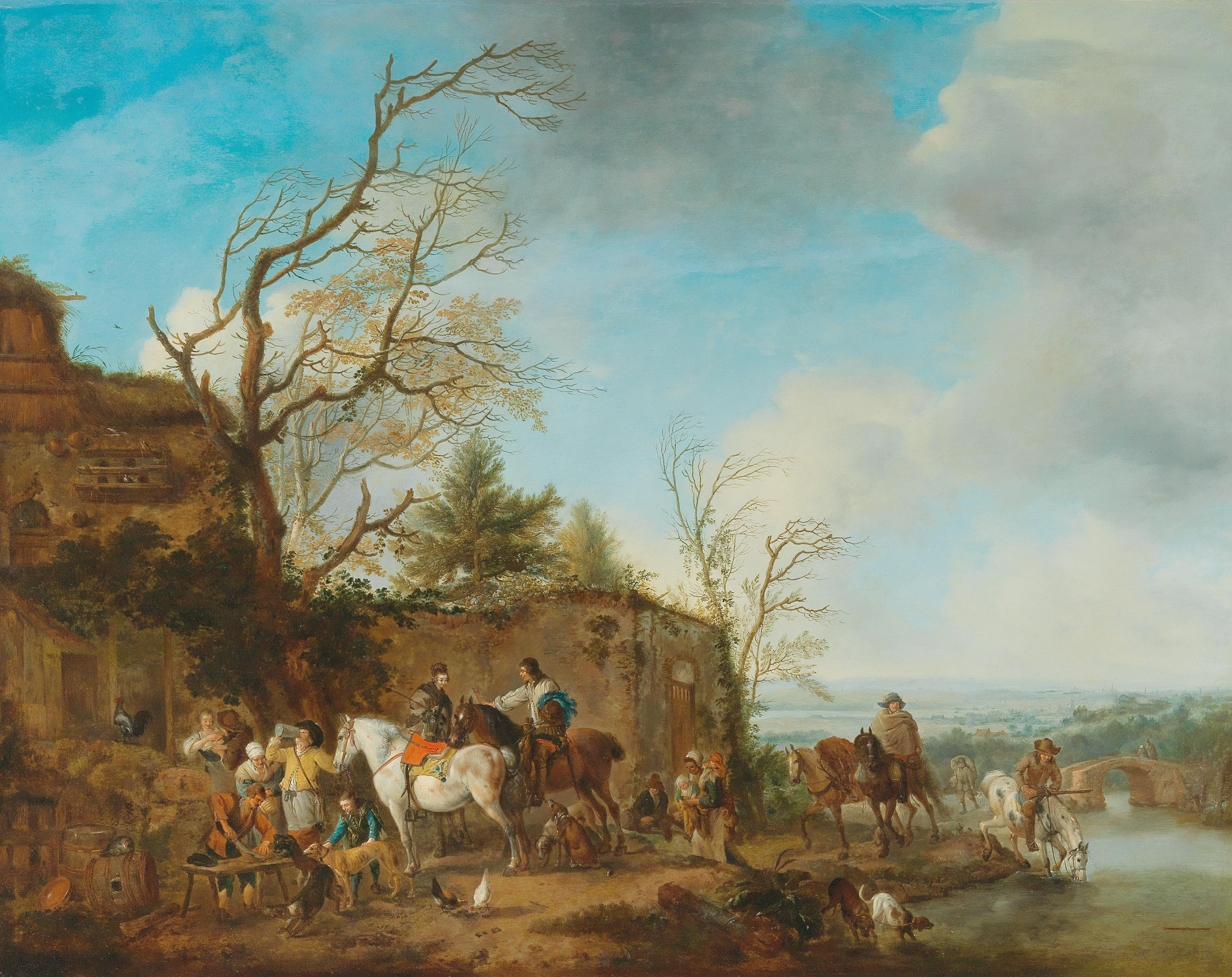
A riding party taking refreshments in a river landscape

Carel van Falens (baptized in Antwerp on 24 November 1683 – Paris, 26 May 1733) was a Flemish painter, draughtsman, copyist, art restorer, art dealer and copyist. He specialised in scenes of hunters and cavalry encampments in the popular style of the Dutch battle and horse painter Philips Wouwerman. He worked most of his life in France where he was a painter to the court and a member of the Académie royale.

== Life ==
Van Falens was born in Antwerp as the son of Jan Baptist and Maria Anna de Kegel. His father was a captain of the local civil militia. In the guild year 1696-1697 he was registered in the Antwerp Guild of St. Luke as a pupil of Constantijn Francken. Constantijn Francken was a successful battle and portrait painter who had been court painter to the king of France.

Van Falens did not join the Antwerp guild but moved in 1703 to Paris, where - unlike his master Francken who had done the same in young age - he stayed for the rest of his life. In Paris, he initially worked as an art restorer. Later he made a living by making copies of the work of Nicolaes van Berchem and Wouwerman.

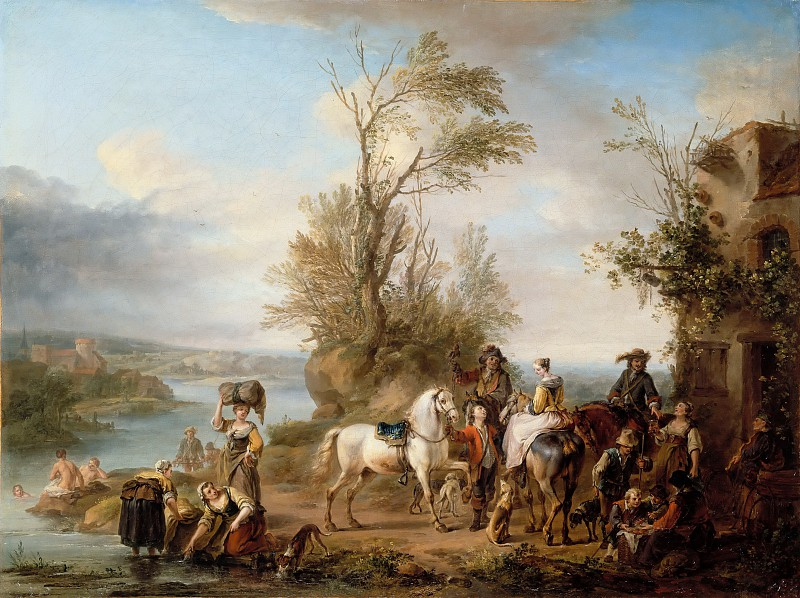
Gathering of Hunters

On 16 July 1716 he got married in the St Thomas Church in Paris with Maria Francisca (Marie-Françoise) Slodtz, the 18-year-old daughter of the Antwerp sculptor Sebastiaen (Sébastien) Slodtz who had moved to Paris where he was sculptor of the royal buildings. The couple was allowed to live in the Louvre at the expense of the state. They had 10 children.

During the Regency, the Duke d’Orléans commissioned van Falens to restore some of his paintings. After the Duke's death he was named Peintre ordinaire du roi to king Louis XV in 1724. He was accepted into the Académie royale in 1726. The work that he submitted for entrance into the Académie was a hunting scene, which was later hung by the académiciens in the position of honour in their meeting room (Salle d’assemblée). This shows that he was held in high esteem by his peers.

He died in Paris on 26 May 1733 in his apartment in the Louvre, at the age of 49. He was buried on 27 May by his three brothers-in-law Sébastien Antoine, Jean-Baptiste and Paul Ambroise Slodtz.

== Work ==
He specialised in scenes of hunters and cavalry encampments. He left a number of works that were fully signed as C.van Falens or signed with his monogram CVF. Many of his compositions base their harmony, pictorial details, vivid and vibrant colours, and texture on the works of the Dutch battle and horse painter Philips Wouwerman. It is believed that because of the similarity in style, works of van Falens have been attributed to Wouwerman while many similar scenes by less talented imitators may have been given to van Falens.
