= René-Michel Slodtz =

French sculptor

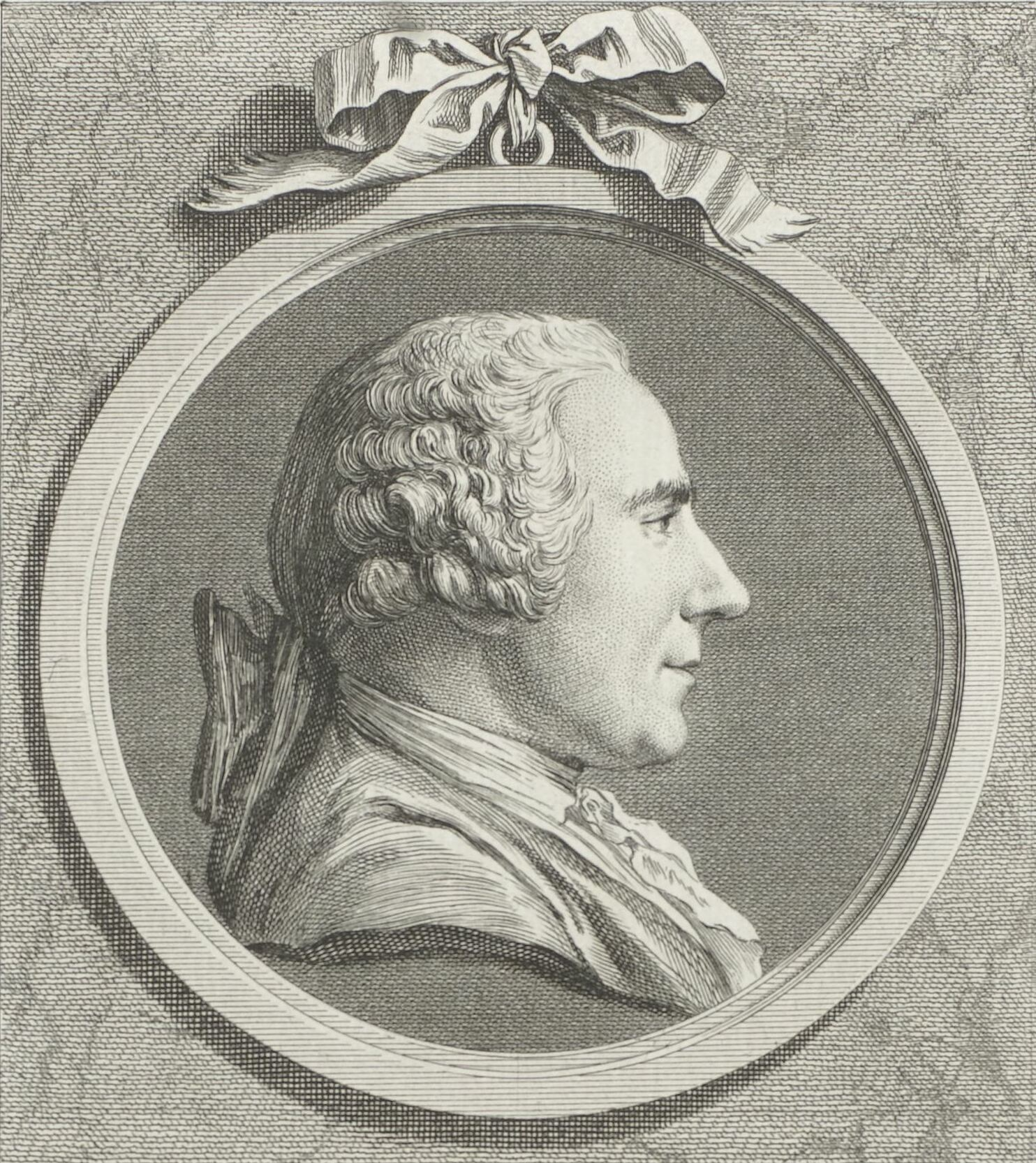
- Michel-Ange Slodtz, circa 1757, engraving by Laurent Cars after Charles-Nicolas Cochin
- Born: René-Michel Slodtz; 1705; Paris, France
- Died: 1764 (aged 58–59); Paris, France
- Known for: Sculpture

René-Michel Slodtz called Michel-Ange Slodtz (1705–1764) was a French sculptor who worked in Baroque style, and active mainly in Paris and Rome for the Menus-Plaisirs du Roi.

== Biography ==
A Parisian by birth, Slodtz's father, Sébastien Slodtz, was also a sculptor.

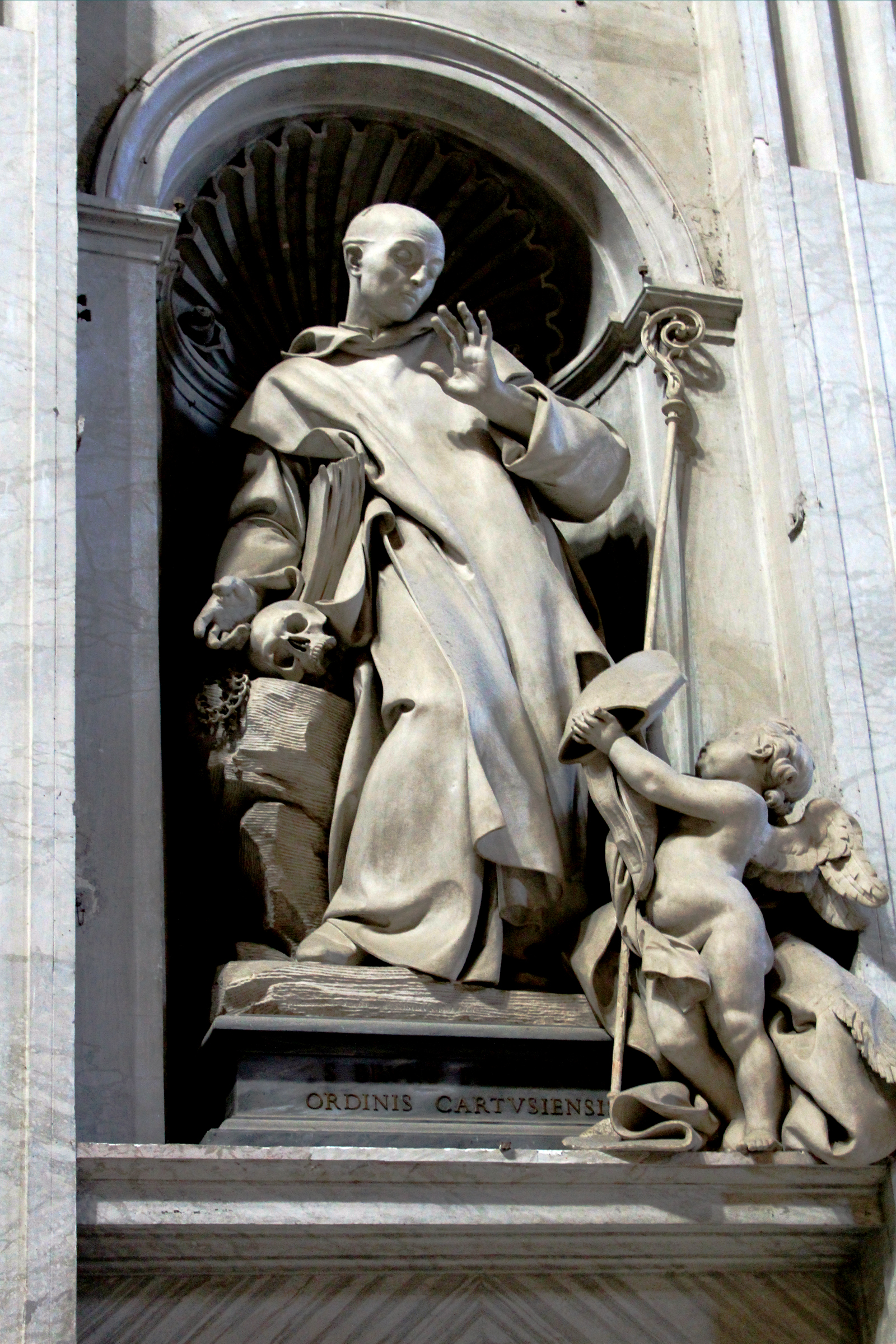
St. Bruno (1744), Rome, St. Peter's Basilica.

Slodtz spent seventeen years in Rome, where he was chosen to execute a statue of St. Bruno (1744) for a niche in the nave of St Peter's. The statue demonstrates the saint's refusal of the bishop's miter and staff offered by a cherub, while his right hand rests on a skull, evoking mortality. The simplicity of the monk's robes and the shaved head adds classical style to the heavily baroque sculpture. He also sculpted the tomb of Marquis Capponi in San Giovanni dei Fiorentini. Other Roman churches showcase his work including San Luigi dei Francesi and Santa Maria della Scala.

After his return to France in 1747, Slodtz, in conjunction with his brothers, Antoine-Sébastien and Paul, produced many decorative works in the churches of Paris, and, though many have been destroyed, his most acclaimed achievement is the tomb of Jean-Joseph Languet de Gergy at St. Sulpice, which was commissioned in 1750.

Slodtz and his brothers were members of the Académie royale de peinture et de sculpture. Notable French artist and sculptor, Charles François Hutin, was a pupil of Slodtz while in Rome.
