= Jacques Sébastien Leclerc =

French painter

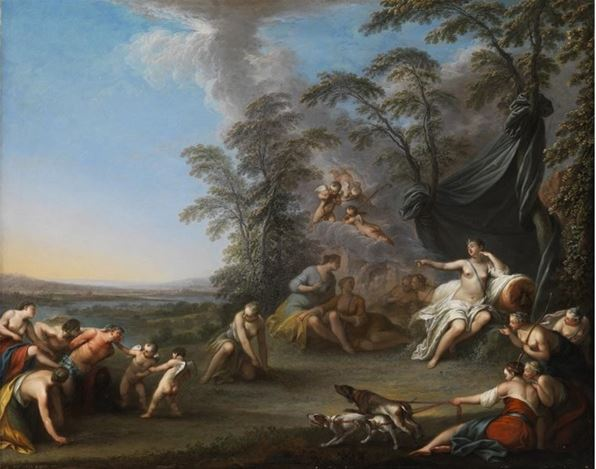
Diana Has the Satyr Punished

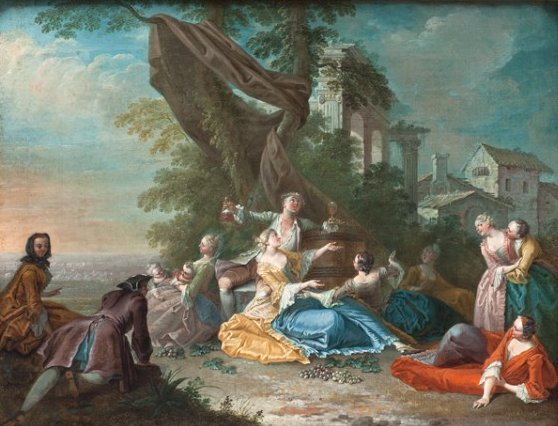
Garden Party

Jacques Sébastien Leclerc, or Le Clerc, known as Leclerc des Gobelins (c. 1734 – 17 May 1785) was a French painter known for mythological and genre scenes.

== Biography ==
He was born in Paris to the artist Sébastien Leclerc (the younger) and his wife, Charlotte née Guillot. His godfather was the sculptor Jacques Caffieri.

His first art lessons were with his father. He was expecting to be appointed a professor at the Académie Royale de Peinture et de Sculpture when his father resigned, but was deemed too young. Instead, in 1758, he became an assistant to Professor Charles-Michel-Ange Challe. After Challe's death in 1778, he was named a professor of perspective and geometry; a position he held until his own death.

He also taught perspective at the Manufacture des Gobelins, while his father was serving as director of the drawing school there. Upon his father's death, in 1763, he once again attempted to fill his vacated position, but met opposition from members of the Académie Royal. Ultimately, Clément Belle was given that position.

Leclerc's paintings are typically small in scale and depict mythological and amorous subjects. He worked in several media including gouache, watercolor, and engraving. In addition to his paintings and teaching activities, he was a designer. The five volumes of Galerie des Modes et Costumes Français contain examples of his work.

Leclerc died in Paris on 17 May 1785.
