= Menus-Plaisirs du Roi =

Administrative unit at the French royal court

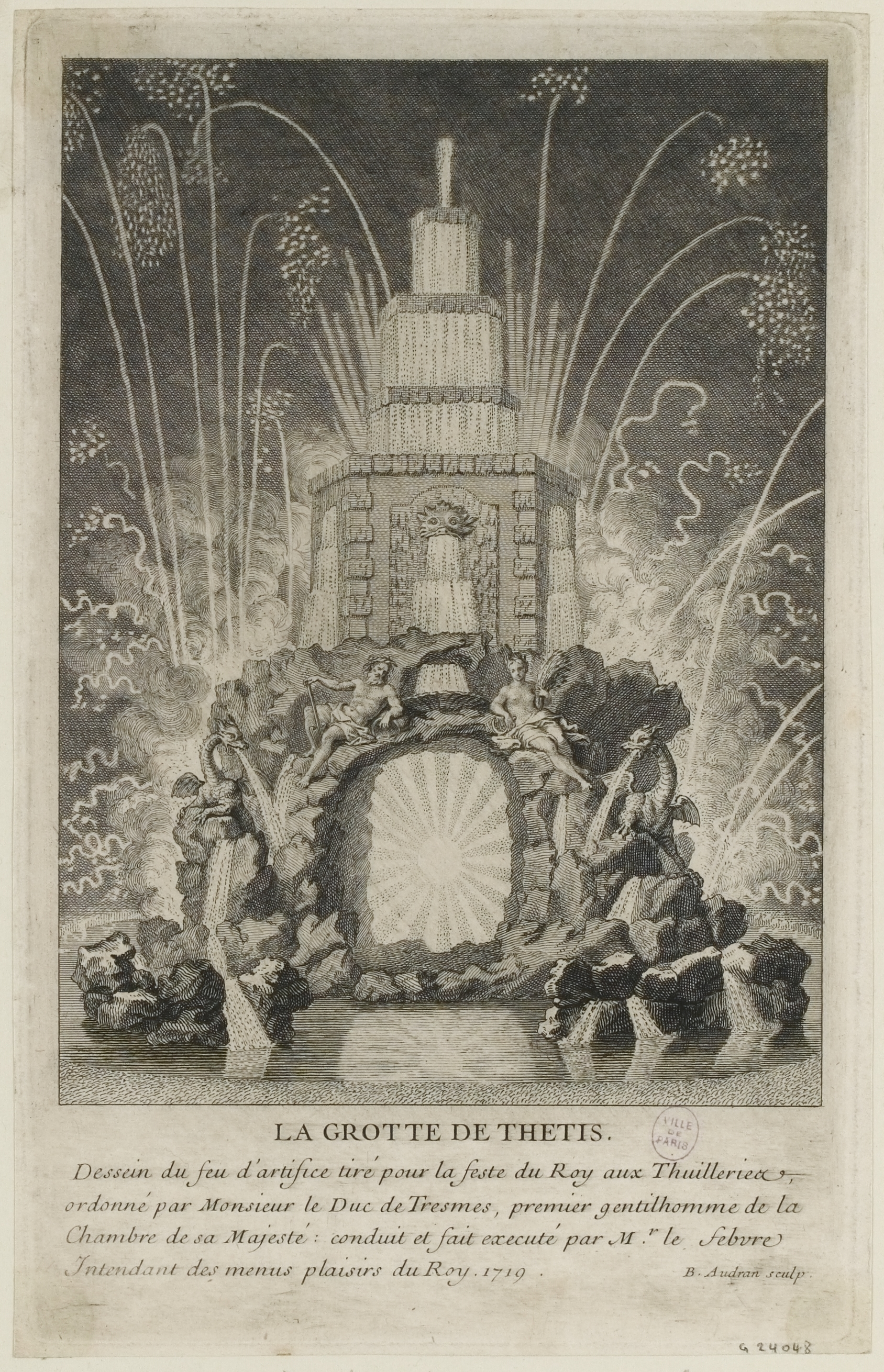
Design for the "Grotto of Thetis," a 1719 firework show for Louis XV at the Tuileries, designed by M. le Sebure, Intendant of the Menus-Plaisirs du Roi.

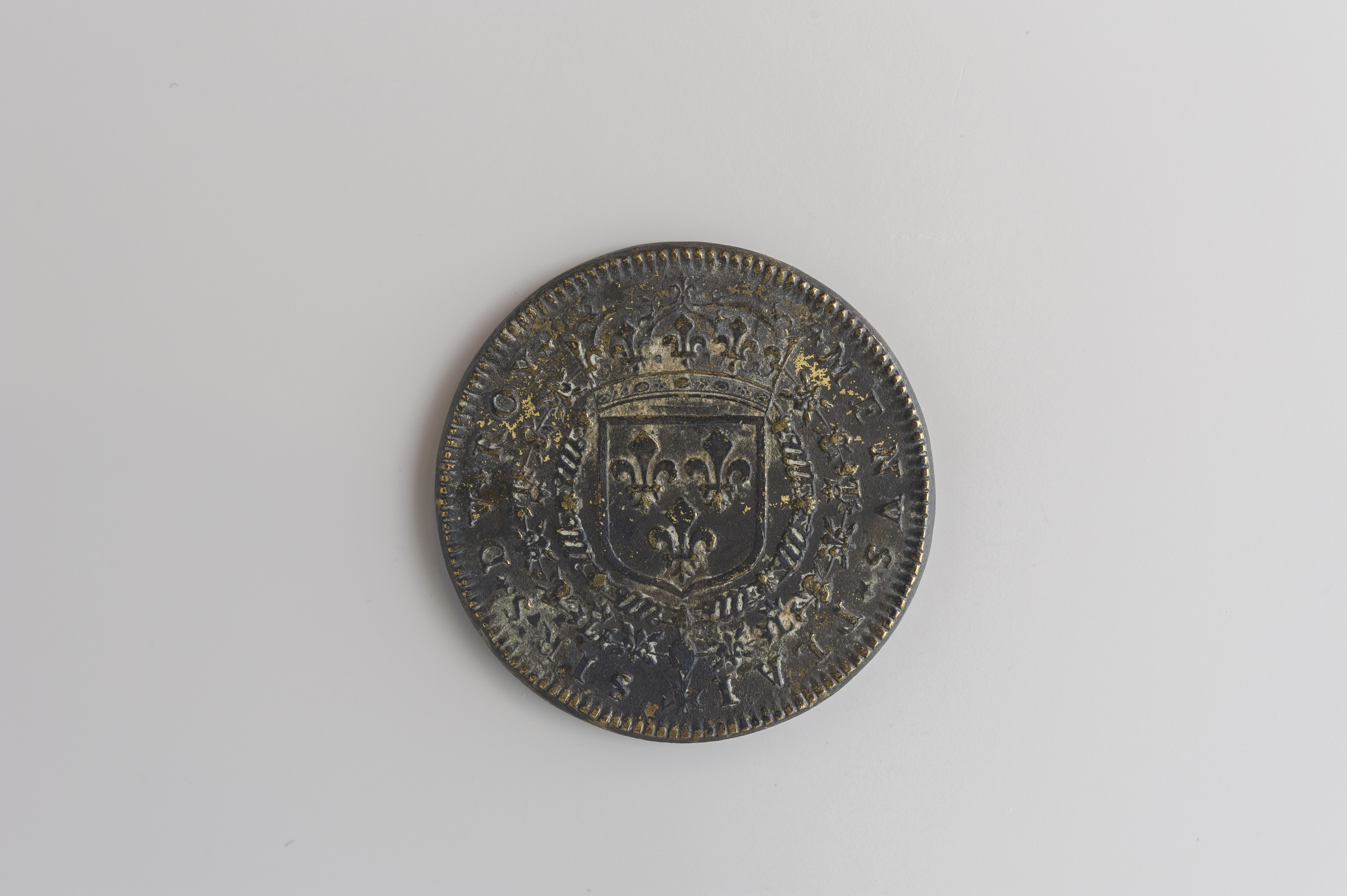
Royal arms of France with legend Menus plaisirs du roy.

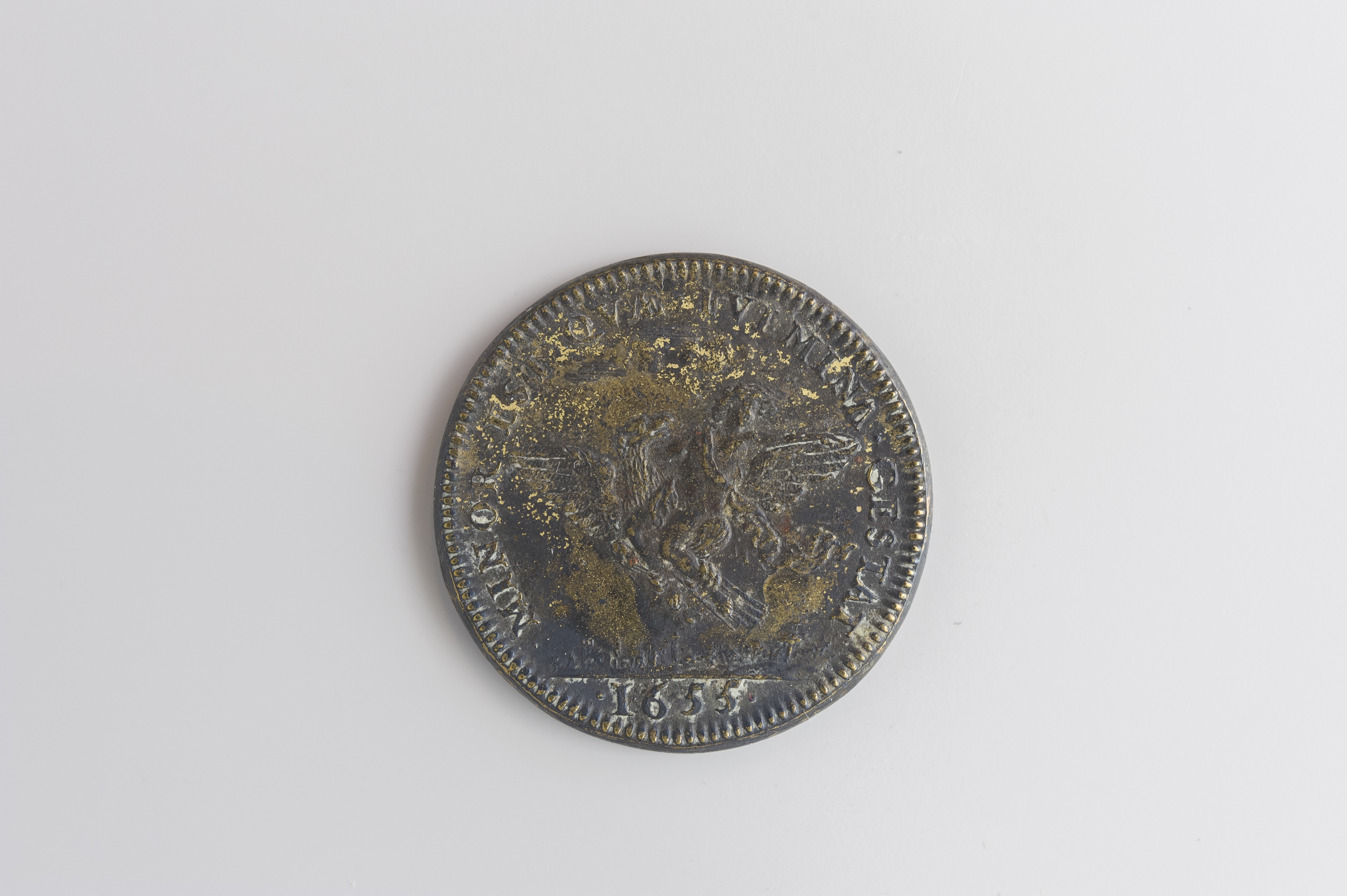
Ganymede holding a lightning bolt and legend Minor est quae fulmina gestat, "Small is that which holds the lightning."

1655 commemorative medal.

The Menus-Plaisirs du Roi (French pronunciation: [məny pleziʁ dy ʁwa]) was, in the organisation of the French royal household under the Ancien Régime, the department of the Maison du Roi responsible for the "lesser pleasures of the King", which meant in practice that it was in charge of all the preparations for ceremonies, events and festivities, down to the last detail of design and order.

== The controller of the Menus-Plaisirs ==
At the king's lever, the premier gentilhomme de la chambre (First Gentleman of the Bedchamber), controller of the Menus-Plaisirs, was invariably in attendance, to hear directly from the king what plans were to be set in motion; by long-standing convention, he was a duke; though he was not a professional, it was up to him to determine the appropriate designs. The duke in charge of the Menus et Plaisirs du Roy was an important court official, quite separate from the Surintendant des Bâtiments du Roi, who was an architect or aristocrat in charge of all building operations undertaken by the Crown. The dukes in charge might leave the design process entirely to the professional intendant in charge, whose right-hand man was the dessinateur du cabinet et de la chambre du Roy; so did two dukes with military careers, Louis-François-Armand du Plessis, duc de Richelieu (1696-1788), appointed premier gentilhomme in 1744 and Emmanuel-Félicité, duc de Durfort-Duras (1715–89), made premier gentilhomme (and pair de France) in 1757. But Louis-Marie-Augustin, duc d'Aumont (1709–82), appointed premier gentilhomme de la chambre in 1723, a position he held until the king's death in 1774, was a noted connoisseur of objets d'art and the arts of life, though not, apparently, of paintings. The duc d'Aumont appointed the renowned gilt-bronze maker Pierre Gouthière doreur ordinaire of the Menus-Plaisirs in 1767 and appointed the architect Bellanger to the Menus-Plaisirs in the same year. For most of the reign of Louis XVI, the intendant of the Menus-Plaisirs du Roi was Papillon de la Ferté, whose journal (published in 1887) throws a great deal of light on the organization of court ceremony.

== Design ==
Many designers were required at the Menus-Plaisirs. From the sixteenth century on, a main responsibility of court architects in Europe was the occasional design of lavish ephemeral settings for processional entries, for masques and ballets, for the structures that supported fireworks and illuminations on nights of grand fêtes for dynastic marriages and births, or to design the catafalque for a state funeral. Architects like Leonardo, Giulio Romano, and Inigo Jones were engaged in projects that were of great moment in expressing the prestige of the court, but which have left little behind, except designs and some commemorative engravings, produced under the supervision of the Cabinet du Roi. The architect Charles-Nicolas Cochin worked for several years for the Menus-Plaisirs du Roi, 1735–51, making detailed renderings for the engravers of architectural designs by the Slodtz brothers. and François-Joseph Bélanger began his career in 1767 working at the Menus-Plaisirs, both designing ephemeral decorations for court entertainments.

In the later reign of Louis XIV, the architect in charge of the Bâtiments was Jules Hardouin-Mansart, but the wholly independent artistic force at the menus-plaisirs until his death in 1711 was Jean Bérain, whose brevet in 1674 covered his responsibilities "for all sorts of designs, perspectives, figures and costumes that it would be required to make for plays, ballets, chases at the ring, carousels..." The purview of the Menus-Plaisirs did not normally extend to furniture, but among its expenses in 1692 were "the furniture and the silversmiths' work for the apartments of the King".

== Personnel ==
Within the Menus-Plaisirs, a hierarchical structure prevailed, with an Intendant supervising the whole and a Dessinateur de la Chambre et du Cabinet du Roi in charge of the orderly production of designs. The Cabinet du Roi—in the seventeenth-century sense of cabinet as collection of works of art and curiosities—was organized by Colbert, who gave formal structure to all the official arts under Louis XIV. The Cabinet du Roi provided the commemorative engravings, which are often our only record, and sold them. The functions of design and commemoration overlapped, needless to say. The position was extremely influential: both Jean Bérain and his son, and later Juste-Aurèle Meissonnier, the genius of the extreme rococo, followed by the Slodtz brothers, one after another, 1750-64. The appointment of the neo-classical architect-designer Michel-Ange Challe in 1764 marked a turning point: through his designs for the Menus-Plaisirs, neoclassicism was introduced at the French court.

== Expenses ==
In addition to these extraordinary expenses, which interest the historian of taste, the journal of the last Intendant of the Menus-Plaisirs, Denis-Pierre-Jean Papillon de la Ferté (1727-1794) describes as well the ordinary expenses, for the Menus-Plaisirs dispensed the salaries of the Premiers Gentilshommes de la Chambre, the Grand Maître de la Garde-Robe, the king's doctor, the médecin de la Chambre, the personnel of the Menus-Plaisirs and the king's musicians. Ordinary expenses entailed the constant renewal of the King's wardrobe and that of the Dauphin, religious ceremonies of all kinds, the king's carriages, small royal gifts like snuffboxes, tents and pavilions for outdoor events.

== Limits ==
The Menus-Plaisirs were not in charge of the essential furniture of the royal palaces, which were the province of the Garde-Meuble de la Couronne. An exception is instructive: the design of the jewel cabinet made as a wedding present for the wedding of the Dauphin Louis to Marie Antoinette was considered part of the design of the festivities as a whole; thus in the Menus-Plaisirs, the design was entrusted by the duc d'Aumont to Belanger in 1769, well in advance of the wedding. It was delivered on 1 May 1770.

== Music division on the rue Bergère ==
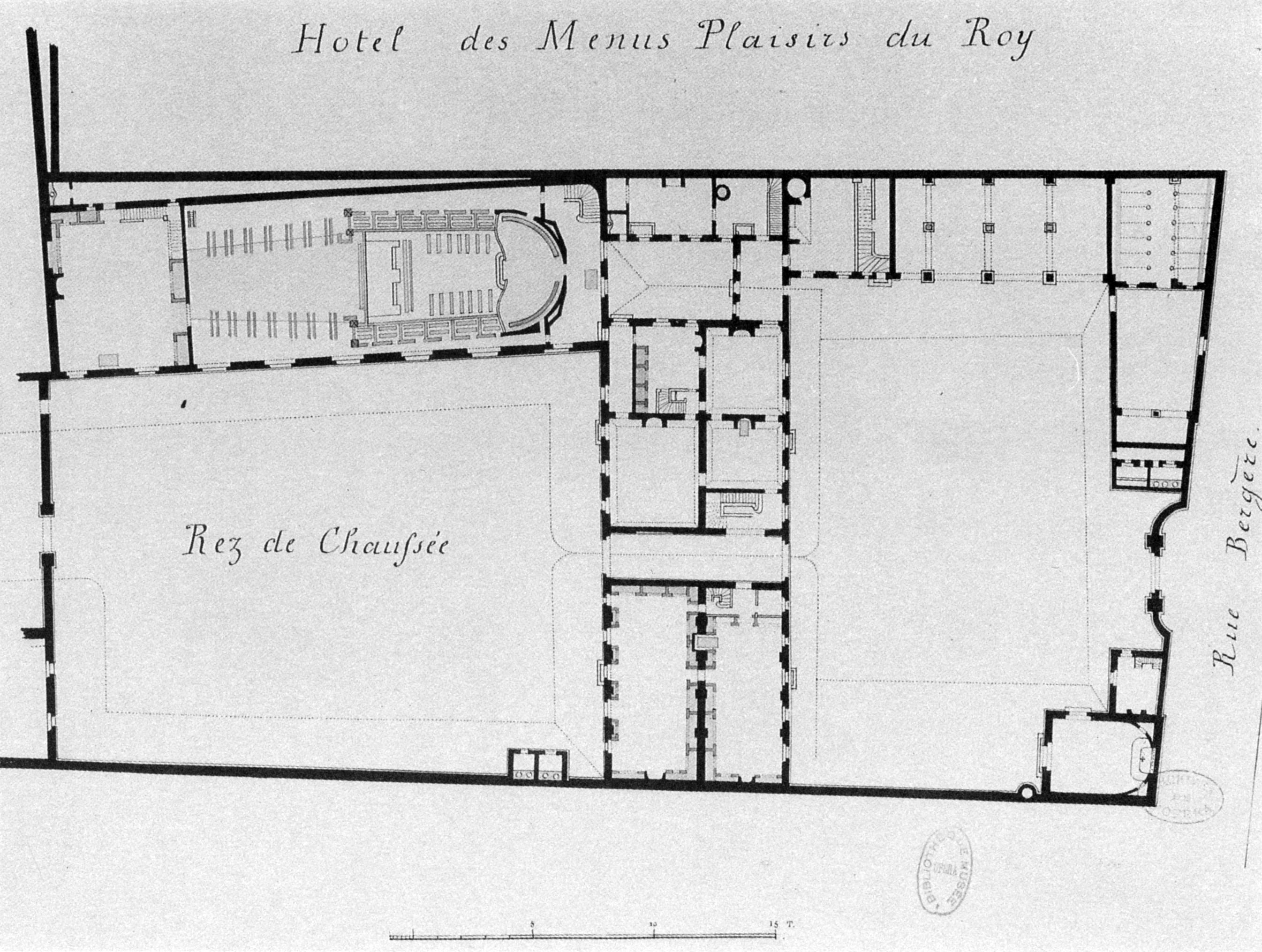
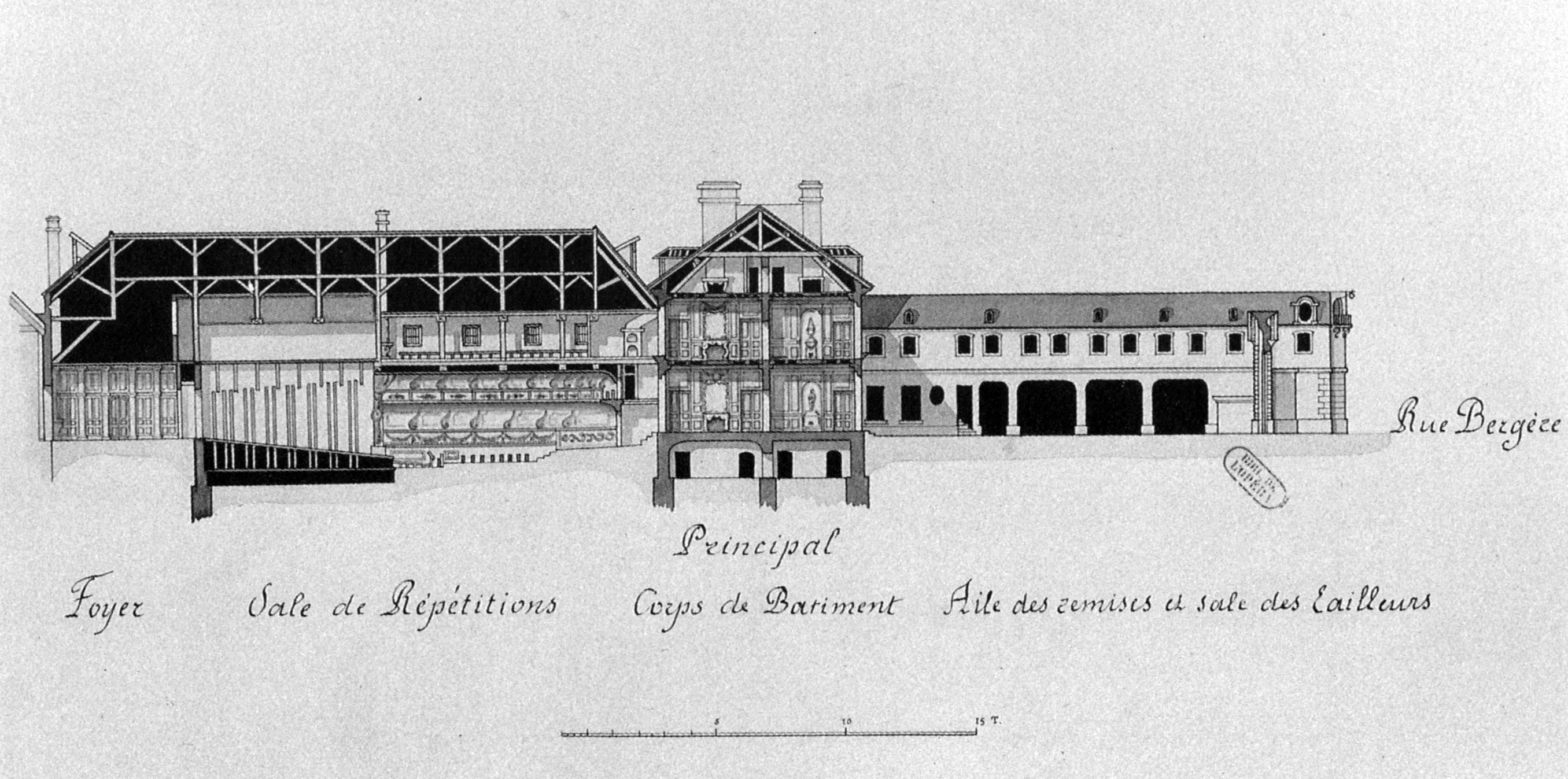
Plan and long section of the Hôtel des Menus-Plaisirs on the rue Bergère (c. 1780)

The music required for these entertainments was also a concern of the Menus-Plaisirs du Roi. Beginning in 1762 the music section was established on a large site extending north from the rue Bergère and west of the rue du Faubourg Poissonnière. The facilities included what had previously been the theatre of the Opéra-Comique at the Saint-Laurent Fair. The site was soon expanded until it reached the rue Richer on the north.

In 1784 Papillon de la Ferté organized the École Royale de Musique, which was housed in buildings on this site on the rue Bergère, and in 1793 the Institut National de Musique, responsible for training instrumentalists of the National Guard bands, was also located here. The two institutions were merged into the Conservatoire de Musique in August 1795. A new Conservatory Concert Hall was added in 1811. Under the French Second Empire a different theatre with the name Théâtre des Menus-Plaisirs was constructed at 14 Boulevard de Strasbourg in Paris.

== Hôtel des Menus-Plaisirs du Roi in Versailles ==
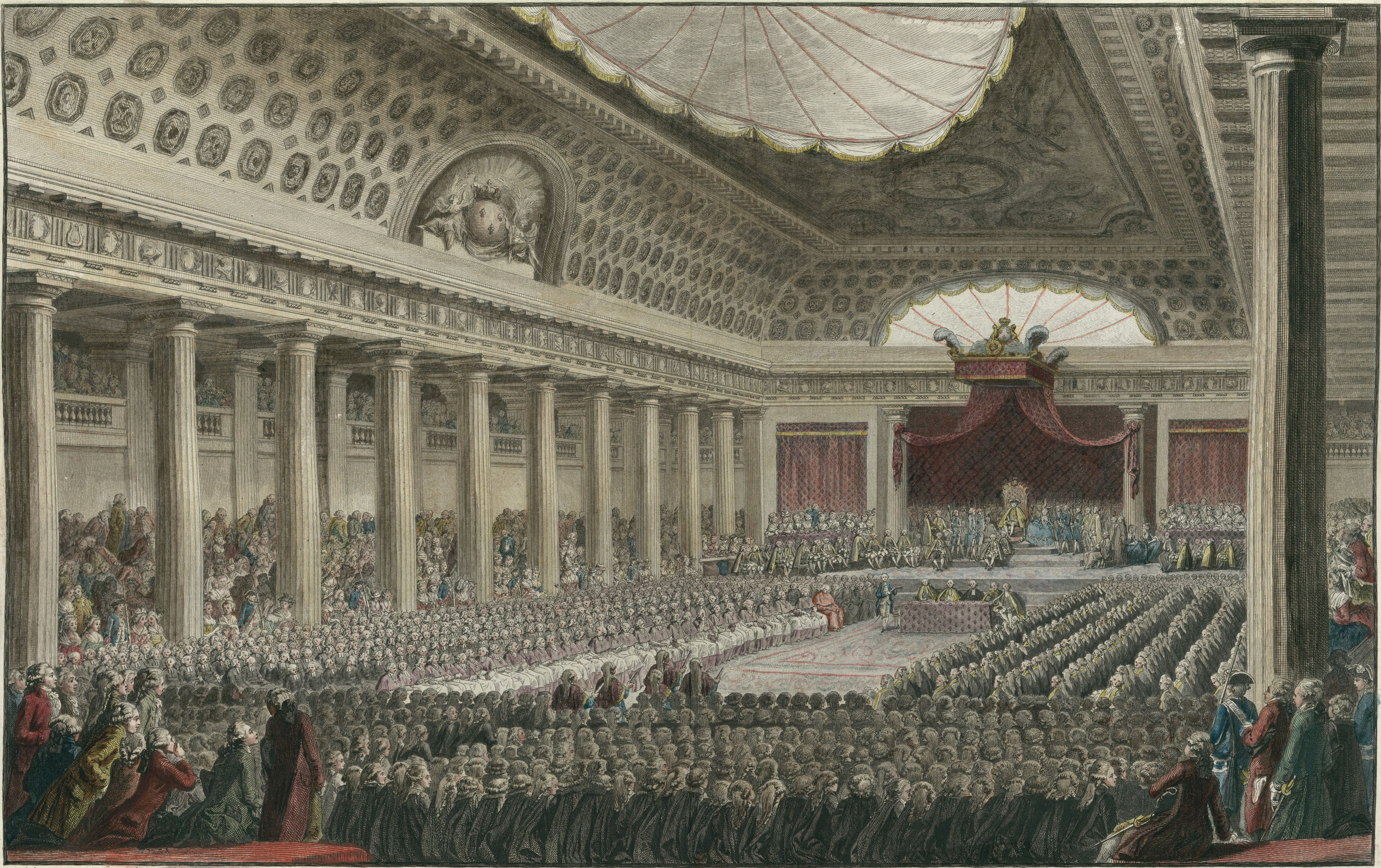
The meeting of the Estates General, in the Salle des États, 5 May 1789

Under Louis XV a structure was erected in the town of Versailles to house the multiple activities of the Menus-Plaisirs. It still stands, at 22, avenue de Paris, now rendered famous as the site of the Estates-General of 1789, at which the opening moves of the French Revolution were played out. A provisionally fitted-out space was arranged in the building to seat the Assembly of Notables in 1787, and again in 1788. Then, to accommodate the press of representatives of the three estates, in the Estates-General, a grander but still temporary Salle des États designed by Pierre-Adrien Pâris was set up in one of the two courtyards of the Hôtel des Menus-Plaisirs. The old Hôtel des Menus-Plaisirs is now the home of the Centre de Musique Baroque de Versailles.

== Menus-Plaisirs at the court of Russia ==
In Moscow, near the Kremlin's walls, between the Komendantskaïa Tower and the Troïtskaïa Tower, stands the Amusement Palace, built in 1652 for the father-in-law of Tsar Alexis, the boyar Ilya Miloslavsky, who lived in it for sixteen years. After his death, the structure was enlarged and converted into a site for spectacles and concerts, taking its new name, and served to house members of the imperial family: here the future Peter the Great received his elementary education.
