= Garde-Meuble de la Couronne =

The Garde-Meuble de la Couronne was, in the organisation of the French royal household under the Ancien Régime, the department of the Maison du Roi responsible for the order, upkeep, storage and repair of all the furniture, art, and other movable objects in the royal palaces.

It oversaw the administration of the Beauvais Manufactory and Gobelins Manufactory.

Since 1870, the organisation is called the Mobilier National.
