= Charles-Michel-Ange Challe =

French painter, draftsman and architect (1718–1778)

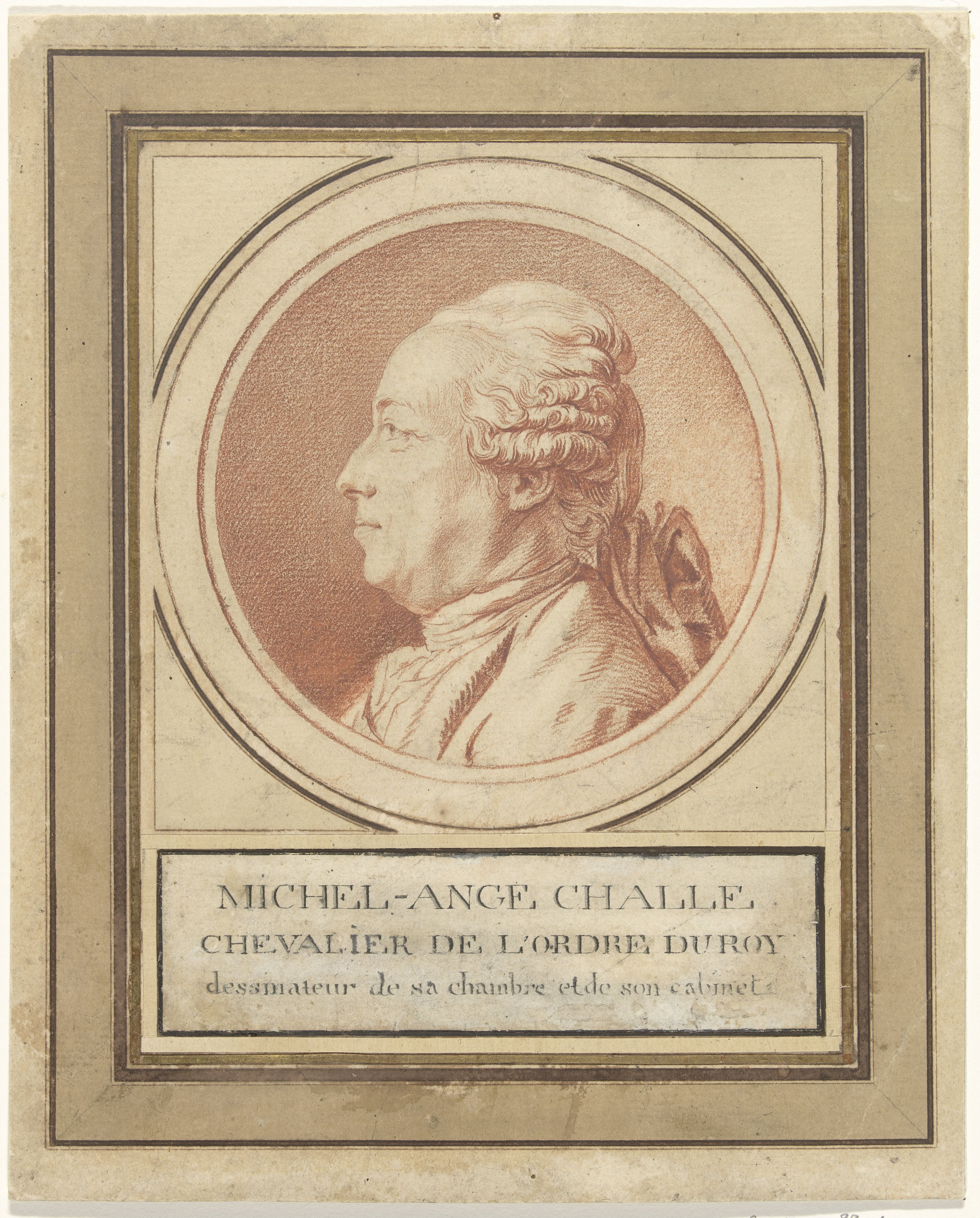
Charles-Michel-Ange Challe (1770s)

Charles-Michel-Ange Challe (French pronunciation: [ʃaʁlmiʃɛlɑ̃ʒ ʃal]; 13 February 1718 – 8 January 1778) was a French painter, draftsman and architect.

Having studied with Boucher and Le Moyne, he was one of the most appreciated painters of his time and enjoyed a huge success across Europe. His architectural drawings in the style of Piranesi contributed to his appointment in 1764 as Draftsman of the Chamber and the Cabinet of the King, charge for which he would produce many ephemeral architectures for parties and great royal funerals.

He played a pivotal role in the transition between rococo and classical styles and was one of the essential contributors to the creation of aesthetics known as the Louis XVI style.

== The first years ==
Charles-Michel-Ange Challe was born in Paris to a modest family from 18 March 1718. He first studied architecture with the Dominican friar Brother André before joining the workshop of François Lemoyne, then at the height of his glory. After the latter's suicide in 1731, he became a pupil of François Boucher, whose friend he became and whose technique would have a lasting influence on him.

In 1738, he first runs for the Prix de Rome and came second. He will be a candidate again in 1740 and 1741, the year he receives the Grand Prize for his Tobit Healing. Among the members of the jury are Nicolas de Largillière and Charles van Loo. His brother, Simon, won the second prize in sculpture the same year.

== The Roman years (1742–1749) ==
He arrived in Rome on 3 November 1742, as a resident at the French Academy in Rome. Under the direction of Jean-Francois de Troy, he made copies of Raphael Stanze in the Vatican to send them to the Gobelins as cartons for tapestries. Challe copied in particular The Encounter between Leo I the Great and Attila. He took advantage of his stay to travel in Italy, from which he brought back a number of architectural drawings and landscapes.

In Campania, he visits Herculaneum and ventured into the crater of Vesuvius, then active, which he will report in a scientific treatise.

As part of the Academy of Rome, he also plays a leading role in the development of festive decorations, or farandoles, in the context of the carnival of 1748 and is brought to collaborate with the architects Louis-Joseph Le Lorrain, Ennemond- Alexandre Petitot and Charles-Louis Clérisseau who will reinforce his neoclassical way. The success of these initiatives will play a significant role in his appointment as head of Menus Plaisirs a few years later.

He remains in Rome for seven years while the normal length of a stay was not supposed to exceed three years.

But it is especially by his drawings of monuments in the style of Piranesi that this period will mark the work of Challe. The influence of the draftsman on the Académie de France, near the studio where his works were engraved, is well known. Throughout his career, Challe will produce a large number of drawings in the style of Piranesi and will work on the French translation of his theoretical works.

He designs temples, triumphal arches, monumental sculptural groups, and bridges for which he uses a number of monumental motifs: columns, funerary urns, obelisks.

== The great years (1749–1764) ==
Back in Paris in 1749, he enjoys a huge success and becomes one of the most prominent painters. In 1752, he is an accredited member of the Royal Academy of Painting and becomes a member two years later. In 1758, he is appointed professor of perspective to replace Sébastien Leclerc. His reception piece at the Academy, The Union of Painting and Sculpture Arts by Drawing, ornates the ceiling of the meeting room.

A prolific painter, he produced many pieces, showing the influence of François Boucher and Nicolas de Troy (Les Charmes multipliés, The Crowned Shepard), which enjoyed considerable success in France but also in Prussia, in all German states, England and Russia. Many European courts invited him without success. The best of his works were engraved (Jupiter and Leda, engraved in 1761 by Jean-Baptiste Tillard).

He exhibited at the Salon of 1753 and will continue to participate in the following years, alongside Jean Siméon Chardin, Etienne Jeaurat, Jean-Marc Nattier, Jean Restout, Louis Tocque, Louis-Michel and Charles van Loo. He displayed religious paintings (Saint Sebastien, Last Judgment, Ascension), history paintings (Lucretia and Brutus, Death of Cleopatra) and portraits (Mignot, sculptor of the king).

But his work for the Salon will earn him in 1763 violent criticism of Diderot after some praise on his Socrates on the Verge of Drinking Hemlock in 1761:

"It looks like being painted a hundred years ago; but it is much older for the way than for the color. It looks like it's a copy after some ancient bas-relief. There reigns a simplicity, a tranquility, especially in the main figure, which is hardly of our time."

His Sleeping Venus is very much appreciated especially at the court:

"It is about this painting that Louis XV asked a lady of his court, famous for her taste in the arts, what she thought of the Salon, she replied that she remembered only the Venus from Challe."

In 1765, he presented a monumental painting: Hector Entering the Palace of Pâris, which earned him unanimous negative reviews and dissuaded him from exhibiting the following years.

Nevertheless, he continued to be very much in demand and became one of the most expensive painters of his time. He decorated many churches (Oratoire du Louvre, Convent of Feuillants, Saint-Hippolyte and Saint-Roch in Paris) and mansions (hotels of the Palatine of Lithuania, of Soyecourt, of Malta, of the Duke of Praslin, of the Duke of Aiguillon).

== Draftsman of the King's Chamber and Cabinet (1764–1778) ==
After the death of the sculptor and ornamanist René Michel Slodz in 1764, he was appointed, by a royal decree of 23 February 1765, Draftsman of the Chamber and Cabinet of the King, a position he obtained thanks to the support of the Duke d'Aumont in competition with other brilliant candidates (de Wailly, Bocquet, Géraud). This charge is then important to the court:

"Machinist, composer of theater clothes and ballet costumes, organizer of funerals, artificer, scenery painter, in a word, man of common taste and easy elegance, such was the draftsman of the cabinet of His Majesty."

He will be particularly famous in the early years for the ephemeral architectures he creates for the great funerals at a time when the taste is in transition to neoclassicism "the Greek way". Thus he conceives the monuments of the infant Philippe de Bourbon, Duke of Parma, of Louis-Ferdinand, Dauphin of France, of Stanislas Leszczynski, King of Poland, of Elisabeth Farnese, Queen of Spain, of the Dauphine Maria Josepha of Saxony, of the Queen of France, of Charles Emmanuel III of Savoy, and finally of King Louis XV himself. The étiquette of the moment indeed requires that great funerals "corroborate the elaboration of a rhetoric that attempts to compose a kind of figurative eulogy that also obeys a precise geography". They constitute a graphic counterpart to the funeral oration. The king's draftsman also creates sets for other royal ceremonies: entrances, weddings, law courts, parties and entertainment. In 1770, he created the ephemeral decoration of the marriage of the Dauphin, future Louis XVI and Marie Antoinette at Versailles and the Orangery with the assistance of Moreau le Jeune (Moreau the Younger) who would succeed him:

"This palace of the Sun, raised at one end of the canal, whose waters reflected torrents of light will remembered for a long time. These groves and beds of fire, basins where the two elements seemed to be confused, the variety of amusements and shows distributed throughout the park to share the crowd."

He is the first to engrave his drawings, which allows one to rediscover today this less known part of French art of the 17th century, all the achievements of Menus Plaisirs having been dismantled after being used.

== The final years ==
In November 1770, an aging Challe was named knight of the Order of Saint Michael and ennobled. He was revered with honors and received at the Academy of Sciences and Fine Arts of Lyon.

In 1762 he married Madeline-Sophie Nattier, the youngest daughter of Jean-Marc Nattier with whom he had no children.

In the last years of his life, he worked on a project to expand the city of Marseille which was first approved by Turgot, Minister of the Navy, before being abandoned. His declining health did not allow him to participate actively in the decor of the Coronation of Louis XVI in Reims in June 1775, which would be directed by his assistant Moreau le Jeune. He died on 8 January 1778 from a violent fever, at age 59.

Beyond his painted and engraved works, he left many books, plays in verse, dramatic works, travel stories and translations of Piranesi, as well as his scientific essay on the Vesuvius, although none have been published under his name and it remains difficult to trace his aliases.

== Works ==
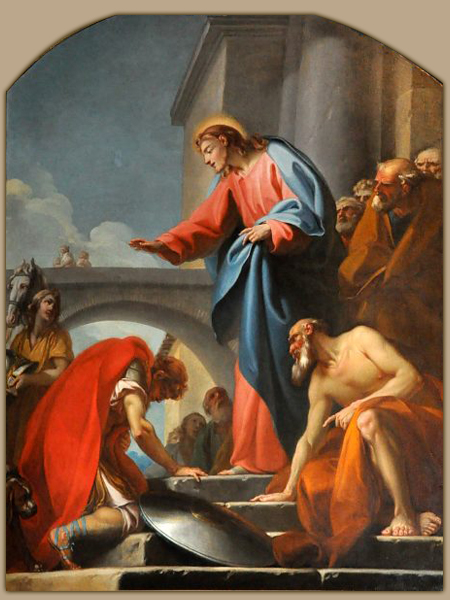
Christ and the Centurion, 1758, Saint-Roch Church, Paris

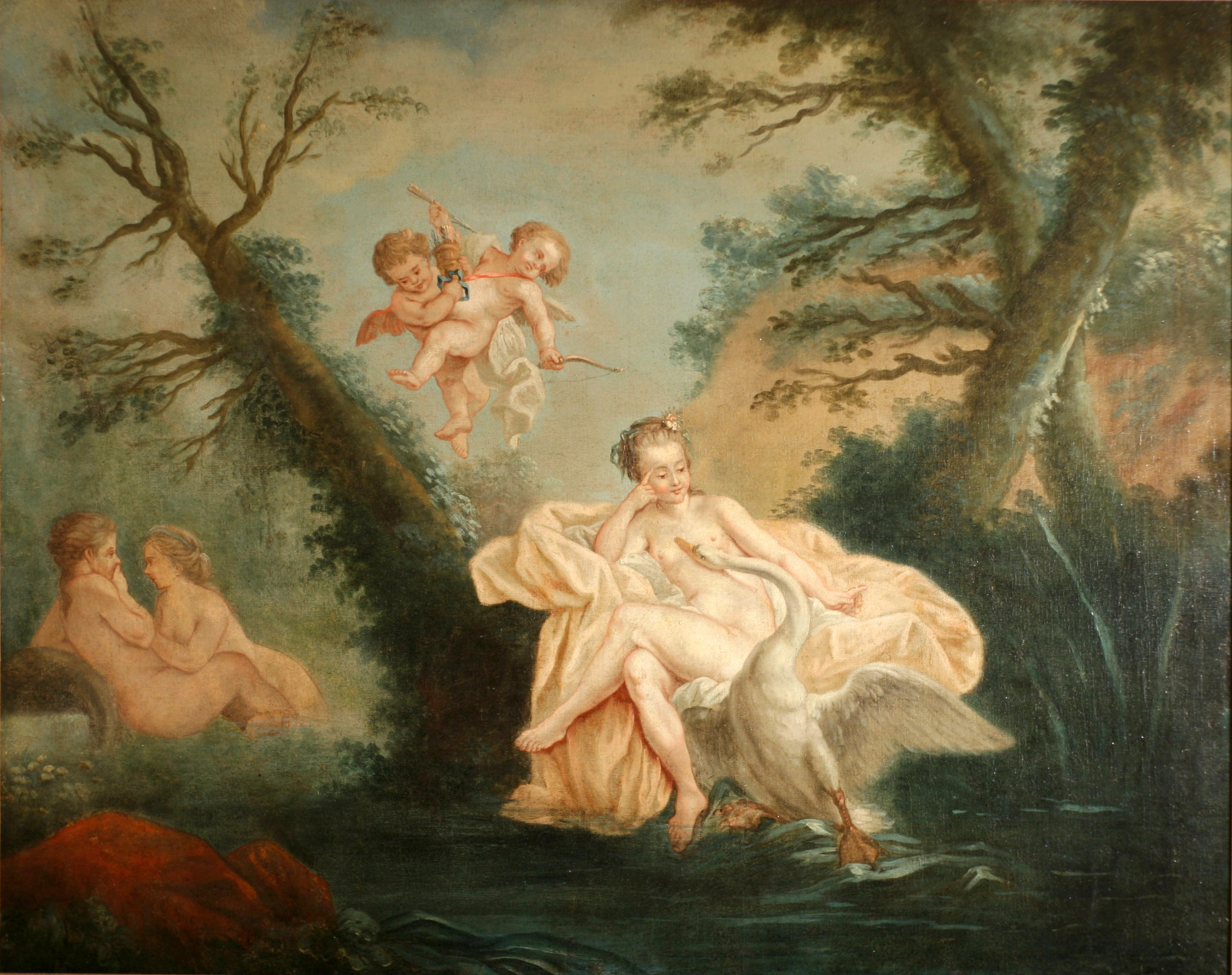
Jupiter and Leda, private collection, New York

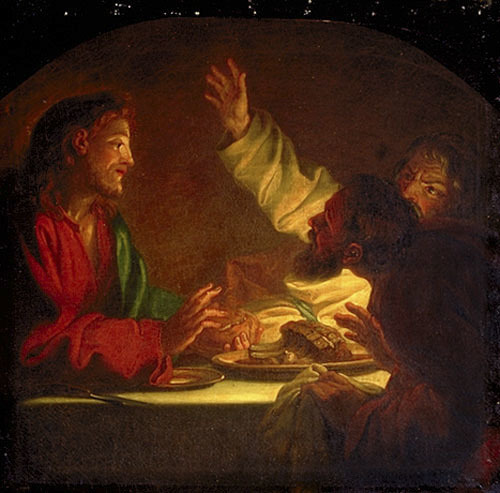
Le Repas d'Emmaüs, 1754–59, Musée national des beaux-arts du Québec

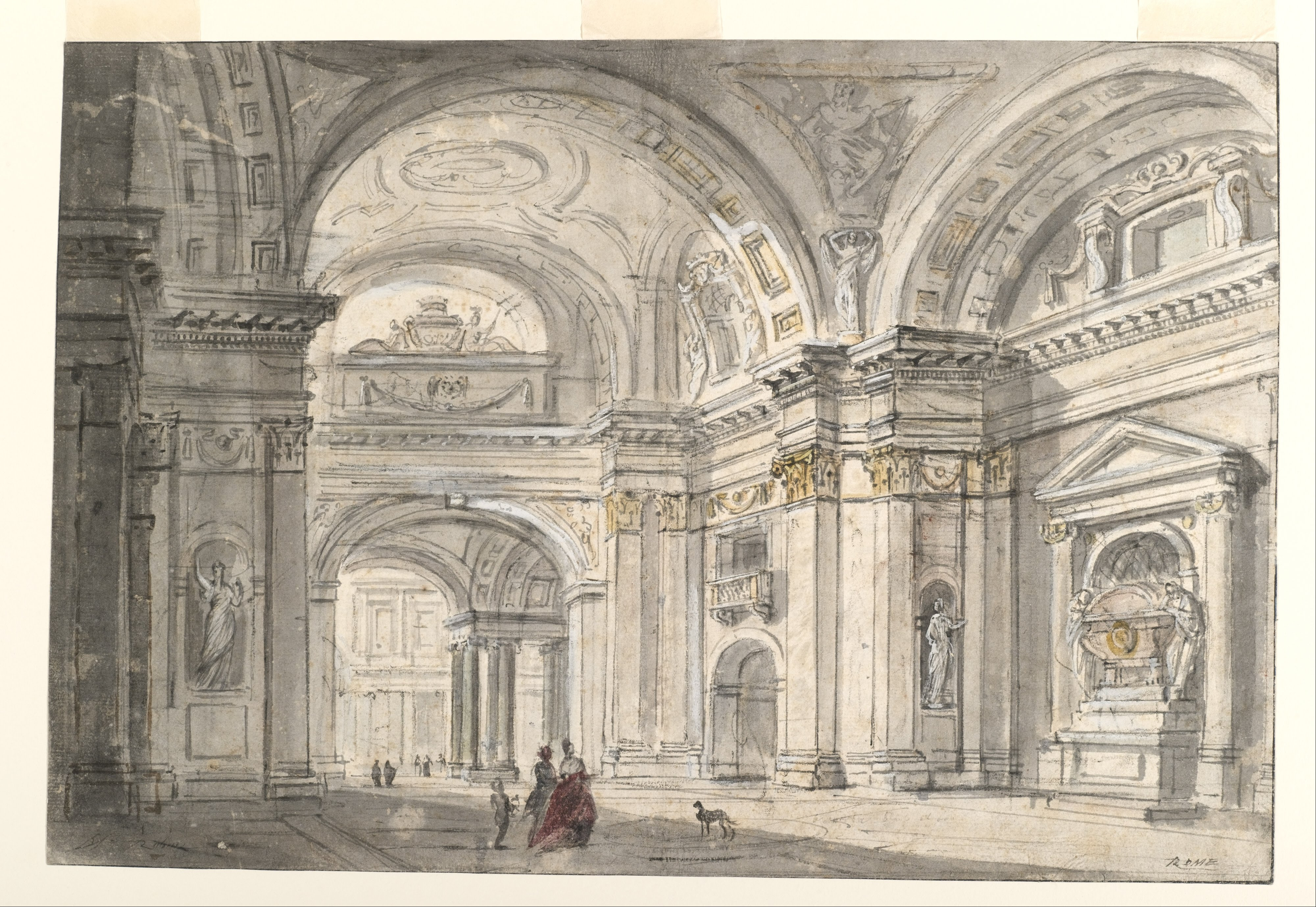
Church Interior, Cooper Hewitt, Smithsonian Design Museum, New York

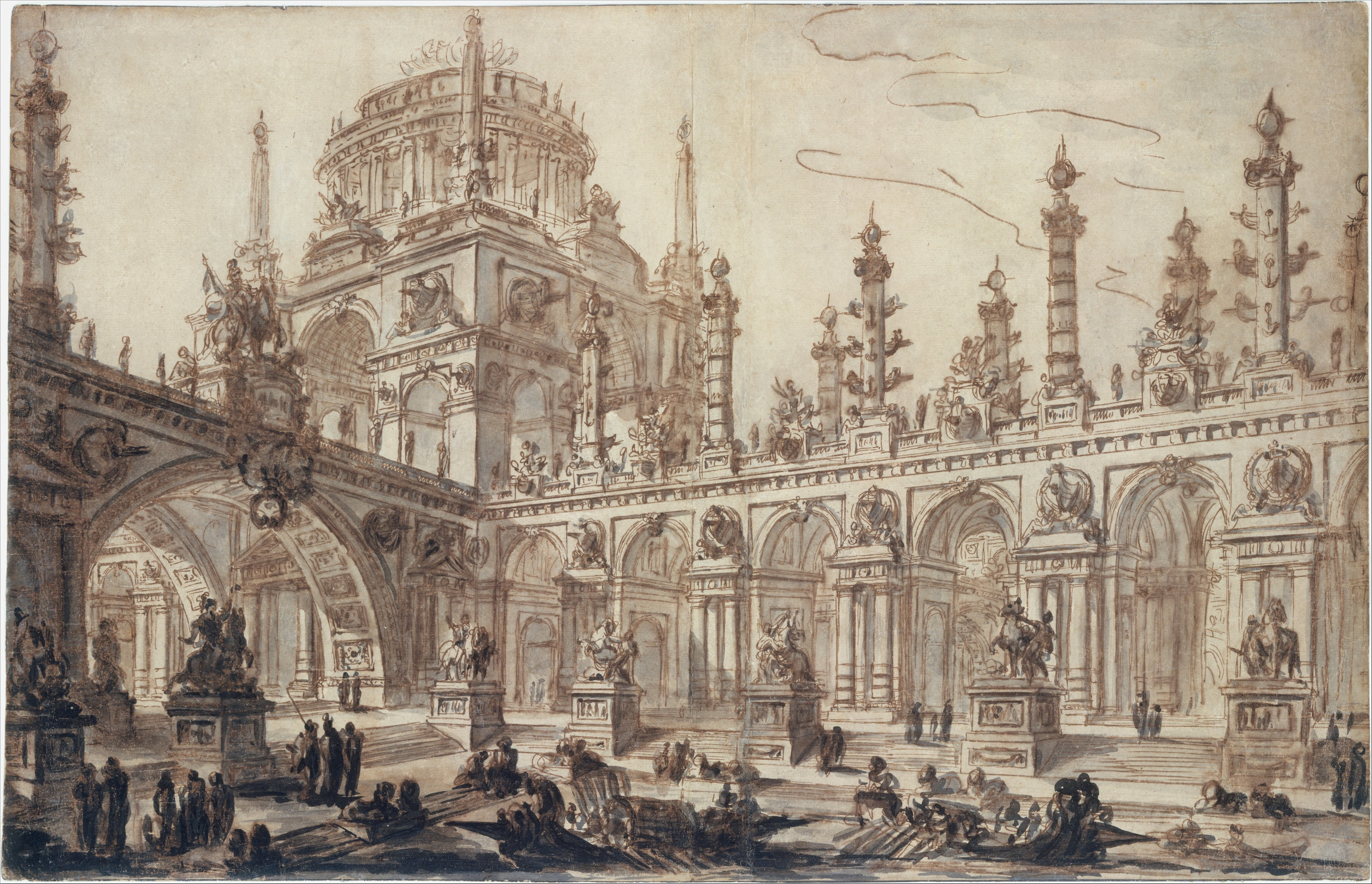
Architectural Fantasy, Metropolitan Museum, New York

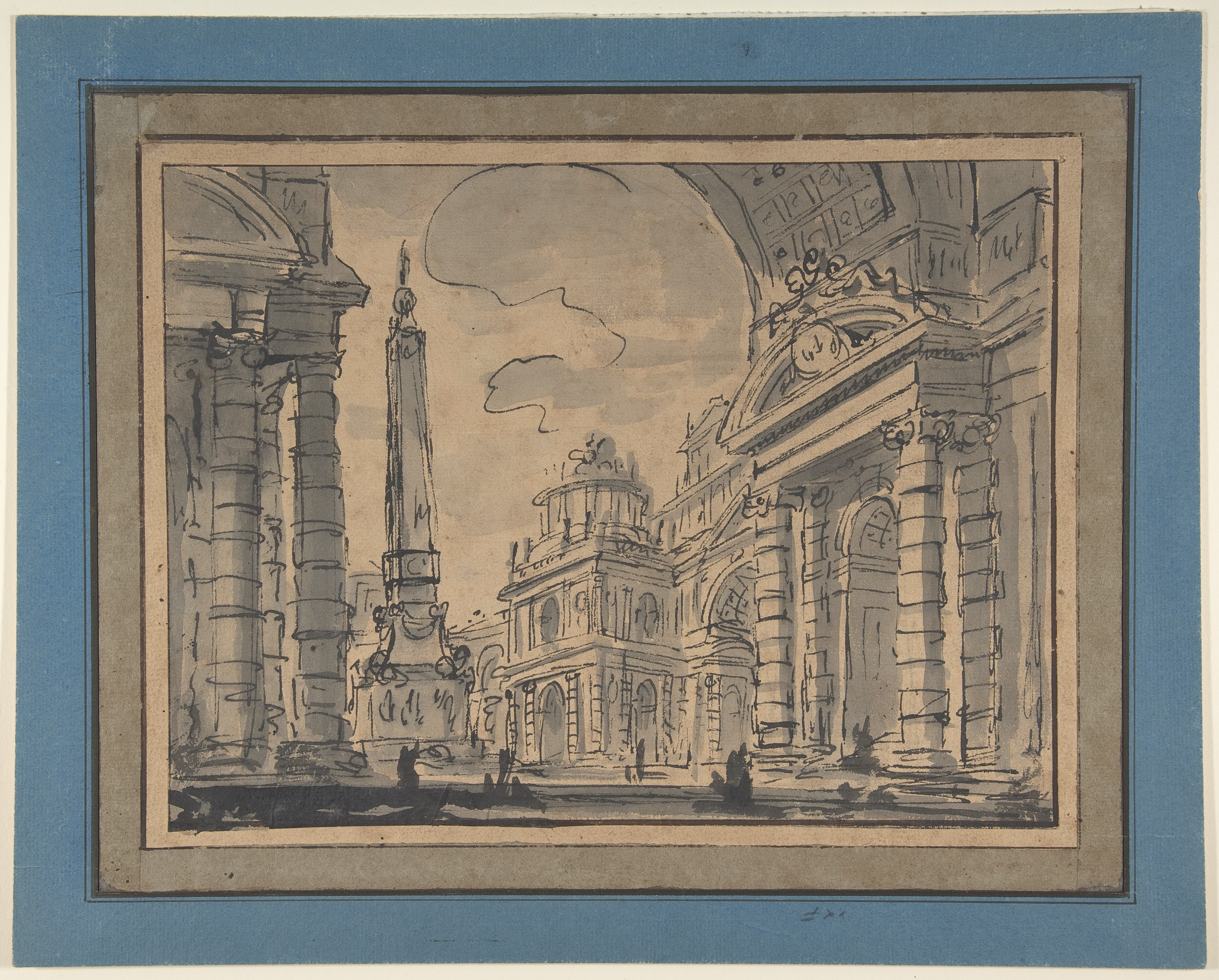
Architectural Capriccio, Metropolitan Museum, New York

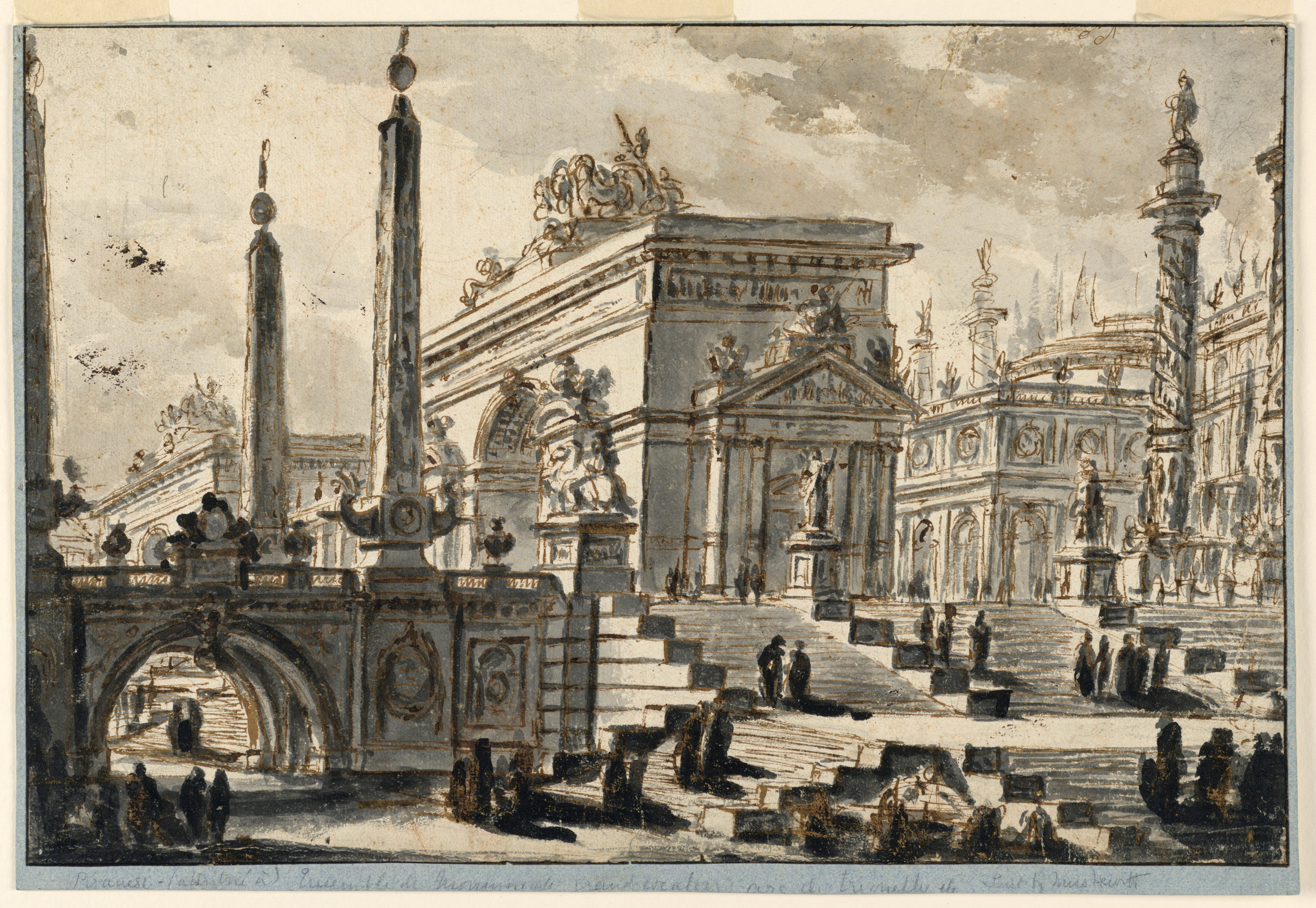
Architectural Fantasy, Cooper Hewitt, Smithsonian Design Museum, New York

=== Paintings ===
- Guérison de Tobie, 1741, École des beaux-arts de Paris
- Vénus et Amour, 1752, 98 x 150 cm, Musée du Louvre, Paris
- Danaé, 1752, 97 x 152 cm, Musée du Louvre, Paris
- Jupiter et Léda, private collection, New York City
- Le Repas d'Emmaüs, 1754–1759, 117 x 126 cm, Musée national des beaux-arts du Québec
- La Résurrection, 1754–1758, 253 x 364 cm, Musée national des beaux-arts du Québec
- Le Christ et le centurion, 1758, Église Saint-Roch, Paris
- Le Génie qui unit la Peinture et la Sculpture, 1753, Palace of Fontainebleau
- La Religion invitant à ses saints mystères, Église Saint-Médard, Paris
- La Mort de Didon, décoration du plafond de l'Académie, Paris
- La Mort d'Hercule, Salon de 1763
- Le Mariage de la Vierge, Église Saint-Bruno, Lyon
- Louis XV glorifié par la Peinture et la Sculpture, plafond du petit salon Louis XV, Palace of Fontainebleau
- Vue de l'intérieur du Colisée, dessin préparatoire, Musée Magnin, Dijon
- Vue des souterrains du Colisée, dessin préparatoire, Musée Magnin, Dijon

=== Engravings from Challe ===
- Jupiter and Leda, engraved by Jean-Baptiste Tilliard, Teyler Museum, Haarlem
- Cleopatra's Death, 1770–1778, engraved by Jean-Baptiste Michel, Portugal National Library, Lisbon

== Bibliography ==
- Dictionnaire Bénézit
- Richard P. Wunder, « Charles Michel Ange Challe, A Study of his Life and Work », in Apollo, janvier 1968
- Marie-Catherine Sahut, « Deux tableaux de Charles-Michel-Ange Challe destinés aux salles du mobilier du XVIIe siècle », in Bulletin de la Société des Amis du Louvre, décembre 2013.
- Allgemeines Künstlerlexikon, K.G. Saur ISBN 3598227450, München / Leipzig, K.G. Saur Verlag, 1992.
- Journal de Paris, numéro 154, 3 juin 1778.
