= Théâtre de l'Académie Royale de Musique =

Théâtre de l'Académie Royale de Musique may refer to the opera company commonly known as the Paris Opera or to one of several different theatres used during periods when the company was officially named the Académie Royale de Musique:

- Salle du Bel-Air, also known as the Jeu de Paume de Béquet (1672–1673)
- Premiere Salle du Palais-Royal (1673–1763)
- Salle des Tuileries (1764–1770)
- Seconde Salle du Palais-Royal (1770–1781)
- Salle des Menus-Plaisirs (1781)
- Théâtre de la Porte Saint-Martin (1781–1791, 1792)
- Théâtre National de la rue de la Loi (1814–1820)
- Salle Le Peletier (1830–1848)
