= Psyché (play) =

Ballet written in part by Molière in 1671

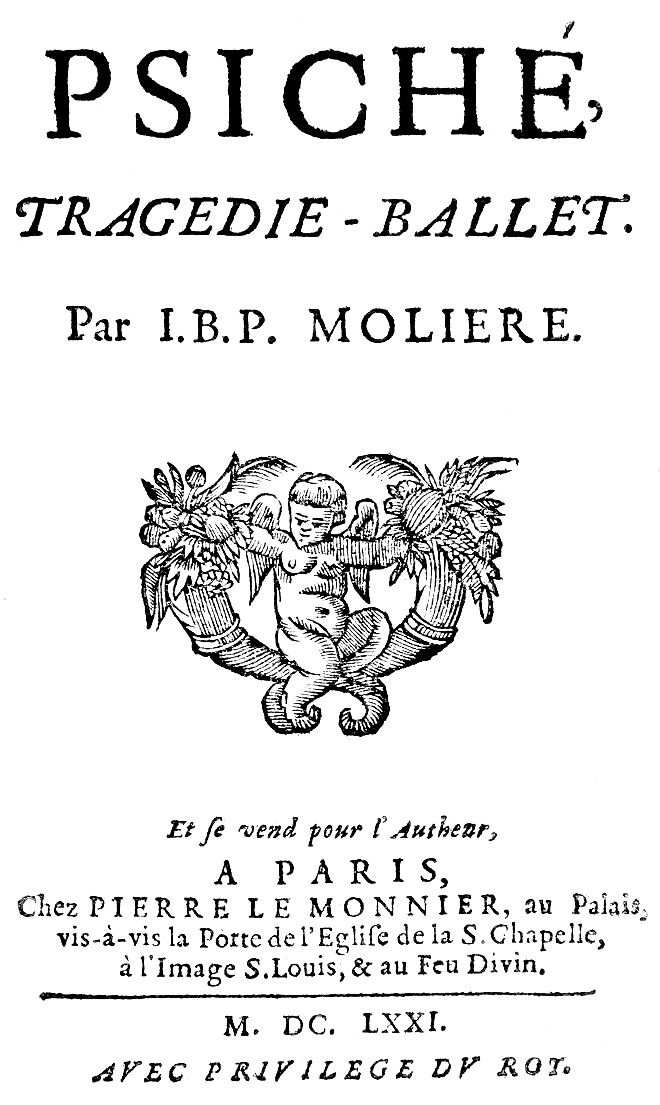
Psyché

Psyché is a five-act tragédie-ballet, originally written as a prose text by Molière and versified in collaboration with Pierre Corneille and Philippe Quinault, with music composed by Jean-Baptiste Lully in 1671 and by Marc-Antoine Charpentier in 1684 (music lost). The plot is based on the story of Cupid and Psyche in The Golden Ass, written in the 2nd century by Apuleius. It was first performed on 17 January 1671 before the royal court of Louis XIV at the Théâtre des Tuileries, with ballets by Pierre Beauchamps, Anthoine des Brosses, and Nicolas Delorge, and spectacular scenery and special effects designed by Carlo Vigarani.

== History ==
Molière's play was one of many sumptuous spectacles produced in celebration of the peace of Aix-la-Chapelle. The treaty was signed in 1668 but the festivities continued well into 1671. More specifically, the play was a product of Louis XIV's desire to re-use the Salle des Machines in the Tuileries Palace which had been built to house Cavalli's opera Ercole Amante in 1662. The theatre was sumptuous and could seat over 7000 spectators, but its excessively large stage and the associated acoustics rendered most performances inaudible. It had remained unused since the end of Cavalli's opera. It is likely that Louis XIV also wished to re-use some or all of the sets from Ercole Amante, at the very least the sets representing Hell.

Molière did not have time to versify the entire play. He was responsible for inventing and outlining the plot, including the coordination of the intermèdes which involved singers, dancers and machines. He versified the prologue, the first act and the first scene of acts two and three. The rest of the play was versified by Pierre Corneille. Philippe Quinault wrote all of the poetry that was set to music. The music itself was composed by Jean-Baptiste Lully.

=== Sources ===
The subject is taken from Apuleius's Metamorphoses (also known as The Golden Ass). The story of Psyche and Cupid is recounted by an old woman to a young girl kidnapped by brigands. Apuleius's version was far too ribald and overtly sexual for the 17th century stage, or even for the 17th century reader, and the story had been adapted to the morals of the time on several occasions. There were two ballets on the subject: the Ballet de la reine tiré de la fable de Psyché of 1619 and Benserade's Ballet de Psyché of 1656. La Fontaine had also published a conte entitled Les Amours de Psyché et de Cupidon in 1669.

== Plot summary ==
Prologue: Flora and her followers summon Venus to participate in their games (in celebration of the peace that Louis XIV has brought to the world). Venus arrives in a fury, however, and breaks the hitherto musical atmosphere of the prologue. She sends her son to punish Psyché, despite his reticence.

Act one: Psyché's jealous sisters attempt to attract the attention of her two most recent suitors, without success. Psyché refuses both suitors before being called away by a messenger. The messenger then informs Psyché's sisters that she must be sacrificed on the mountain top and devoured by a monster. The sisters confess their delight before a group of mourners arrive on stage and sing the first intermède, the plainte italienne.

Act two: The King informs Psyché of her fate. She accepts it unflinchingly, though her father prefers to defy the gods. After bidding him farewell, her sisters arrive and seem unwilling to leave her alone. Psyché pushes them to save themselves, but they reply that oracles are always mysterious and perhaps her fate will not be so hard after all. They finally leave and Psyché believes herself to be alone at last to face her doom when her suitors appear to defend her. She chastises their impiety. Their attempt to defend her is in any case vain, as she is carried away by zephyrs. The set changes for the third act, representing a magnificent palace. At this time, Vulcan sings the second intermede, encouraging his crew of cyclops to finish building the palace.

Act three: Zephyr informs Cupid that he has successfully brought Psyché to her new palace and expresses his surprise at Cupid's new, adult appearance. Psyché wakes up and is confused by her splendid surroundings. Rather than being attacked by a monster, Psyché is greeted by the dashing figure of Cupid who declares his love for her. After a love scene, Psyché impresses upon Cupid (whose identity she still does not know) that she must share her happy fate with her sisters and father. Cupid resists, but finally concedes and sends Zephyr to fetch Psyché's sisters. For the third intermède, Cupid invites a Cupid and a Zephyr to sing a divertissement in honour of Love.

Act four: Psyché's sisters, having seen Psyché's new home are, naturally, green with envy and try to find a way to spoil her happiness. They feed her curiosity regarding the identity of her lover and make her fear his unfaithfulness, suggesting that all the palace may be no more than a lie, an enchantment. Zephyr takes them away. Psyché demands to know the identity of her lover. Cupid resists, saying that to know his identity is to lose him forever, but swears that he will tell her if she wishes it absolutely. She insists, and Cupid confesses his identity, then disappears, taking the palace with him. Alone in a lugubrious setting, Psyché bemoans her fate, and resolves to drown herself in the river. The River God forbids her, saying the heavens forbid it and that an easier fate may be in store. But in the meantime, Venus arrives to chastise and to punish Psyché. In the fourth intermède Psyché descends to hell, where eight Furies dance a ballet to celebrate the rage they have inspired in so sweet a goddess as Venus. Psyché passes in Charon's boat with the box the Venus orders her to obtain from Proserpine.

Act five: Psyché is in Hell and meets her two suitors. They recount how they threw themselves from the rock on which Psyché was sacrificed, having been unable to prevent her death. They also recount the death of her sisters, who voluntarily threw themselves off a cliff, proudly believing that Zephyr would carry them back to Cupid's palace. Psyché, determined to regain the love of Cupid, opens Proserpine's box, hoping to enhance her beauty. But a poisonous vapour comes out of the box, killing her. Cupid descends to lament what her death and forgives her. Venus descends and chastises Cupid for his rebellion. He confronts his mother for her cruelty towards the object of his love. He calls on Jupiter for aid, who takes his side and grants Psyché immortality. The scene changes from Hell to Heaven and a great ballet is danced by the followers of Apollo, Bacchus, Momus and Mars to celebrate the union of Cupid and Psyché.

== Literary reception ==
The play was given for the first time on January 17, 1671. Like the traditional ballet de cour of the time, many eminent figures at court participated in the ballets (particularly the final intermède) alongside professional musicians and dancers. The play and ballet were performed several times at the Salle des Tuileries during the Carnaval period.

Molière continued to give the play at his usual venue, the Théâtre du Palais-Royal. He was required to renovate his theatre in order to stage the play. These renovations, consisting mostly in stage machinery, cost the troupe over 4000 livres (roughly 50 000 euros today), not including the cost of hiring extra musicians, singers and dancers. The investment proved worthwhile, however, since the success of the play was spectacular. During Molière's lifetime (that is to say over the course of the next two years), the play was given 82 times (not including the initial representations at the Tuileries) for a total profit of 77 119 livres. It was necessary to modify the intermèdes somewhat since there was neither enough space nor enough money to mount such lavish ballets as at the Tuileries. But aside from the more restrained forces, the text and structure of the court and city versions are virtually identical.

The same expense that pushed Molière to reduce his cast has caused the play to become virtually unknown in our time. The play is too difficult to mount and is therefore known more as a work of literature to be studied than as a play that anyone has seen. But despite its impractical qualities (for today's theatre companies at least) and the limited participation of its principal author, Psyché is widely accepted to be one of Molière's greatest successes and one of his finest plays.
