= Vigarani =

Vigarani is a surname. Notable people with the surname include:

- Carlo Vigarani (1637–1713), Italian scenic designer
- Lorenza Vigarani (born 1969), Italian swimmer
