= Salle de la Bouteille =

Coordinates: 48.855394°N 2.337596°E

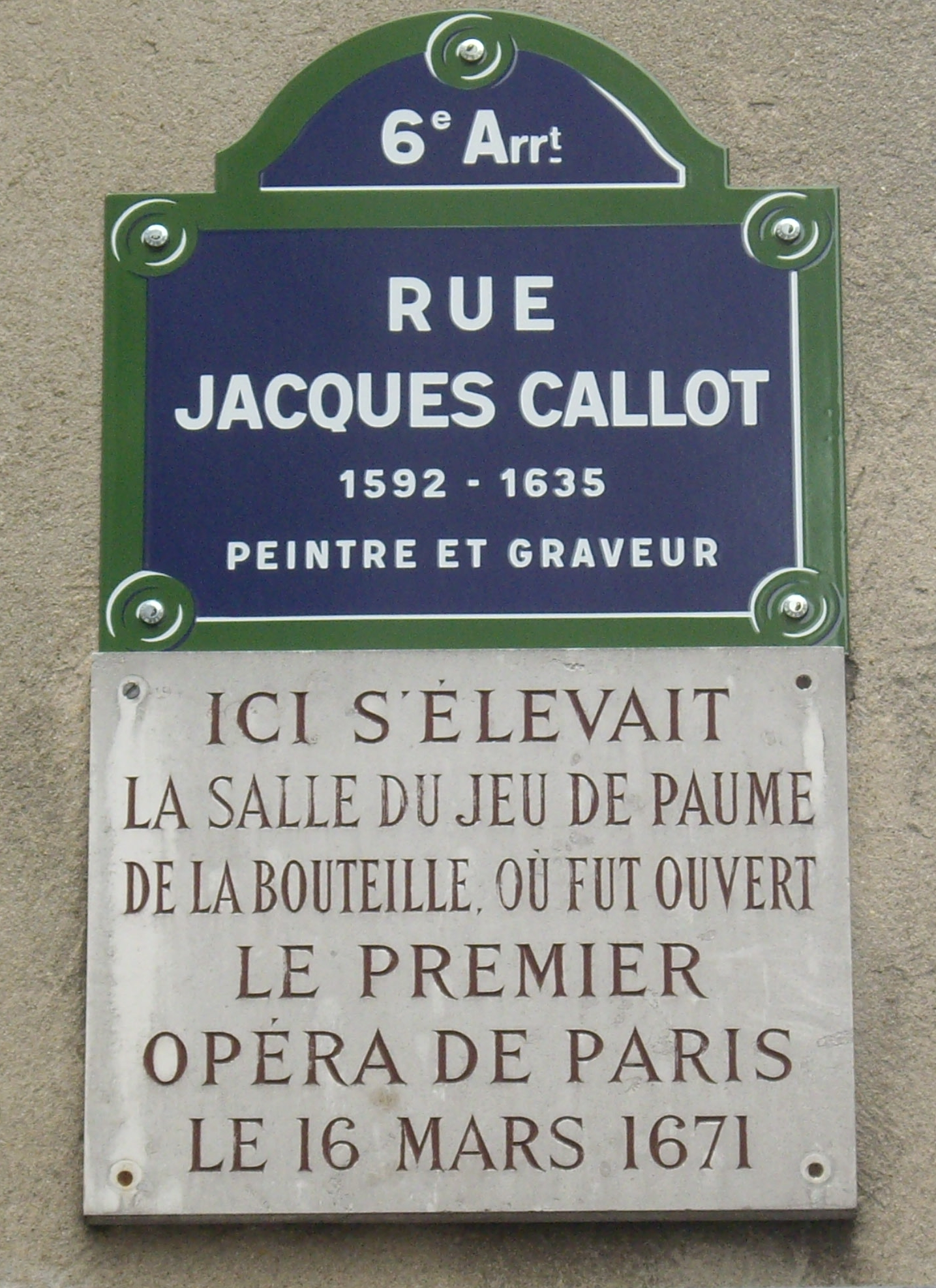
Plaque at the intersection of the rue Jacques-Callot and the rue Mazarine: "Here was erected the Salle du Jeu de Paume de la Bouteille, where the first opera of Paris opened on 16 [sic] March 1671."

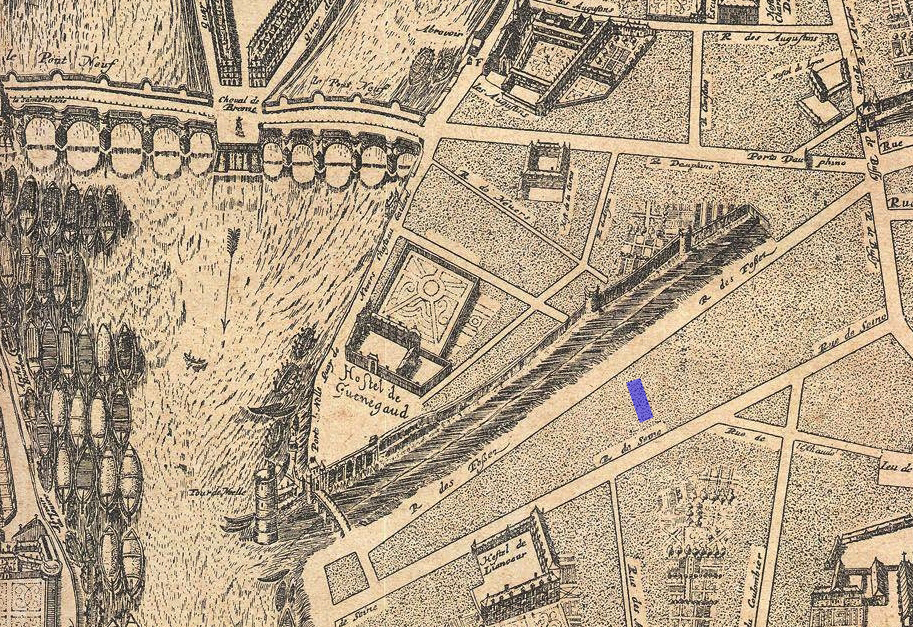
Future location of the Jeu de Paume de la Bouteille marked in blue on the map of Gomboust (1652)

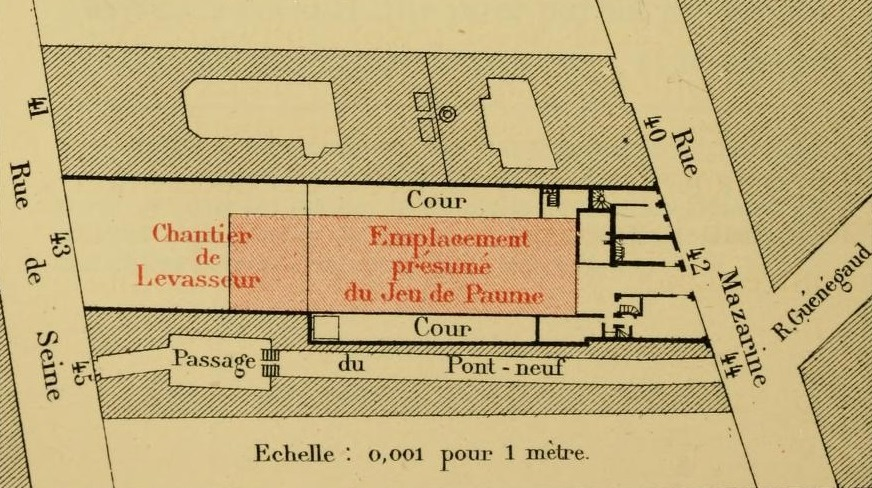
Presumed plan of the theatre near the Passage du Pont-Neuf (1886)

The Salle de la Bouteille (French pronunciation: [sal də la butɛj]) or Salle du Jeu de Paume de la Bouteille ([sal dy ʒø də pom də la butɛj]), later known as the Hôtel [de] Guénégaud ([otɛl də ɡeneɡo]) or Guénégaud Theatre, was a 1671 theatre located in Paris, France, between the rue de Seine and the rue des Fossés de Nesle (now 42 rue Mazarine, at its intersection with the rue Jacques Callot). It was across from the rue Guénégaud, which ran behind the garden of a townhouse formerly known as the Hôtel de Guénégaud on the quai de Nevers. The theatre was the first home of the Paris Opera and in 1680 became the first theatre of the Comédie-Française. It closed in 1689 and was later partially demolished and remodeled for other purposes.

== History ==
Originally a tennis court (jeu de paume) that was converted into a theatre, it was inaugurated in 1671 as the first home of Pierre Perrin's Académie d'Opéra (see Paris Opera). The first French opera, Robert Cambert's Pomone with a libretto by Perrin, premiered there on 3 March of that year. A second lyric work, Les peines et les plaisirs de l'amour, with a libretto by Gabriel Gilbert and music by Cambert, was performed in 1672. On 13 March 1672 the surintendant of the king's music, Jean-Baptiste Lully, acquired Perrin's rights to perform opera and named his company the Académie Royale de Musique, although it also continued to be called the Opéra. Because of legal difficulties Lully could not use the Salle de la Bouteille, and moved the Opéra to a theatre built by Carlo Vigarani in the Bel-Air tennis court on the Rue de Vaugirard.

In 1673, after the death of Molière, the Salle de la Bouteille became the home of the Guénégaud Theatre, a company formed from the remnants of the troupe of Molière and players from the Théâtre du Marais.

In 1680, after merging with the troupe from the Hôtel de Bourgogne, the company became known as the Comédie-Française and continued to perform in the Guénégaud until 1689, when it moved to the Jeu de Paume de l'Étoile on the rue des Fossés-Saint-Germain-des-Prés (the southeastward extension of the rue des Fossés de Nesle), today known as the rue de l'Ancienne-Comédie.

== Bibliography ==
- Bashford, Christina (1992). "Cambert, Robert", vol. 4, pp. 696–698, in The New Grove Dictionary of Opera, 4 volumes, edited by Stanley Sadie. London: Macmillan. ISBN 9781561592289.
- Chappuzeau, Samuel (1674). Le théâtre français, edited by G. Monval. Paris: Bonnassies, 1875.
- Clarke, Jan (1998). The Guénégaud Theatre in Paris (1673–1680). Volume One: Founding, Design and Production. Lewiston, New York: The Edwin Mellen Press. ISBN 9780773483927.
- Forman, Edward (2010). Historical Dictionary of French Theater. Lanham: The Scarecrow Press. ISBN 9780810849396.
- Harris-Warrick, Rebecca (1992). "Paris. 2. 1669–1725", vol. 3, pp. 856–858, in The New Grove Dictionary of Opera, 4 volumes, edited by Stanley Sadie. London: Macmillan. ISBN 9781561592289.
- Howarth, William D., ed. (1997). French Theatre in the Neo-Classical Era 1550–1789. Cambridge: Cambridge University Press. ISBN 9780521100878 (digital reprint, 2008).
- La Salle, Albert de (1875). Les Treize Salles de l'Opéra. Paris: Librairie Sartorius. Copy at Google Books. Notice bibliographique at the BnF.
- Lecomte, Louis-Henry (1905). Histoire des théâtres 1402–1904. Notice préliminaire. Paris: Daragon. View at Google Books.
- Nuitter, Charles; Thoinan, Ernest (1886). Les Origines de l'Opéra français (in French). Paris: E. Plon, Nourrit et Cie. Copies 1 and 2 at Google Books.
- Powell, John S. (2000). Music and Theatre in France 1600–1680. Oxford: Oxford University Press. ISBN 9780198165996.
- Sadler, Graham (2001). "Robert Cambert", p. 150, in The New Penguin Opera Guide, edited by Amanda Holden. New York: Penguin Putnam. ISBN 9780140514759.
- Wiley, W. L. (1960). The Early Public Theatre in France. Cambridge, Massachusetts: Harvard University Press. OCLC 331219. Greenwood Press reprint (1973): ISBN 9780837164496.
