= Salle du Bel-Air =

Second theatre of the Paris Opera, 1672–1673

Coordinates: 48.848905°N 2.339235°E

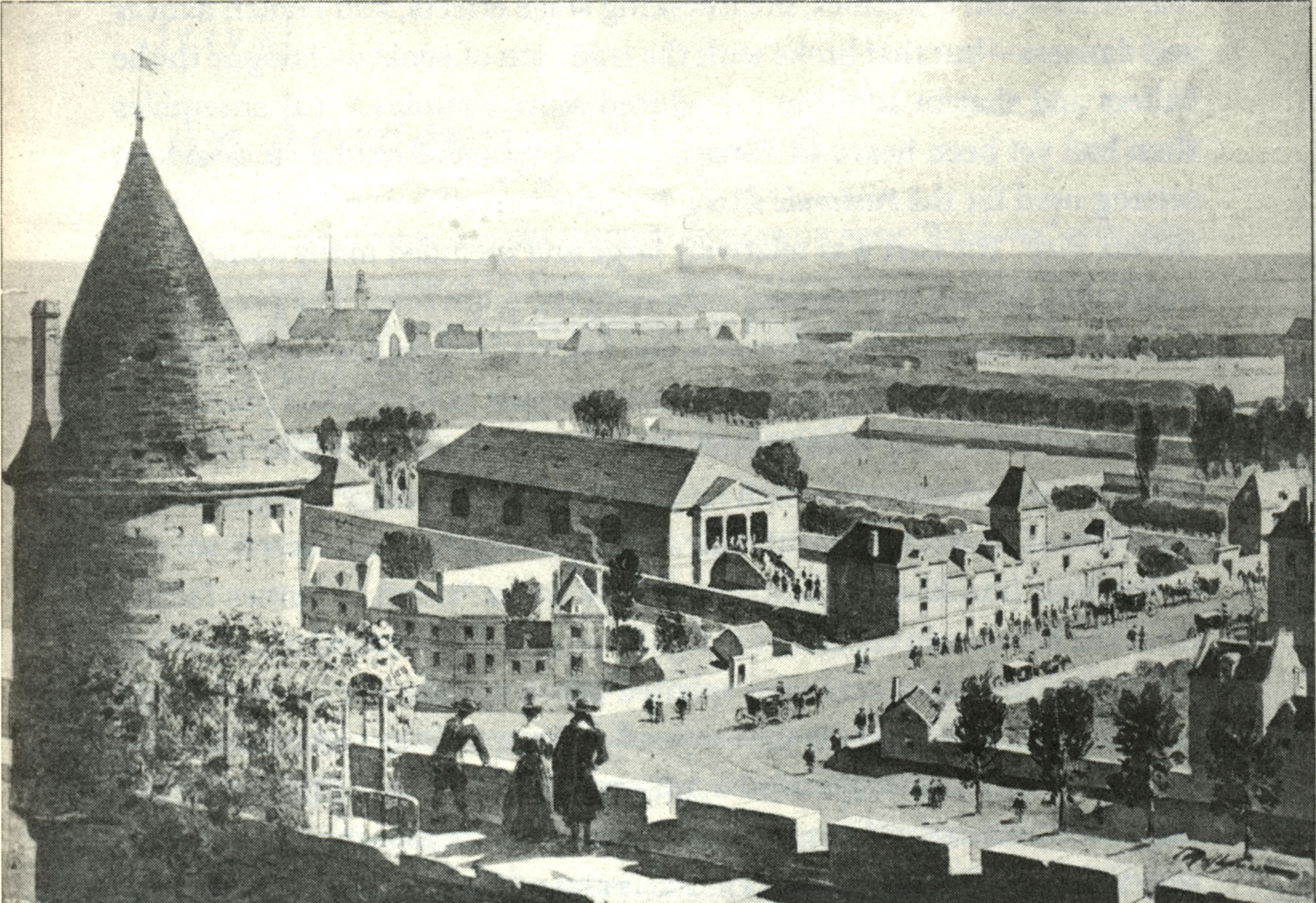
View of the Salle du Bel-Air from the city ramparts overlooking the moat

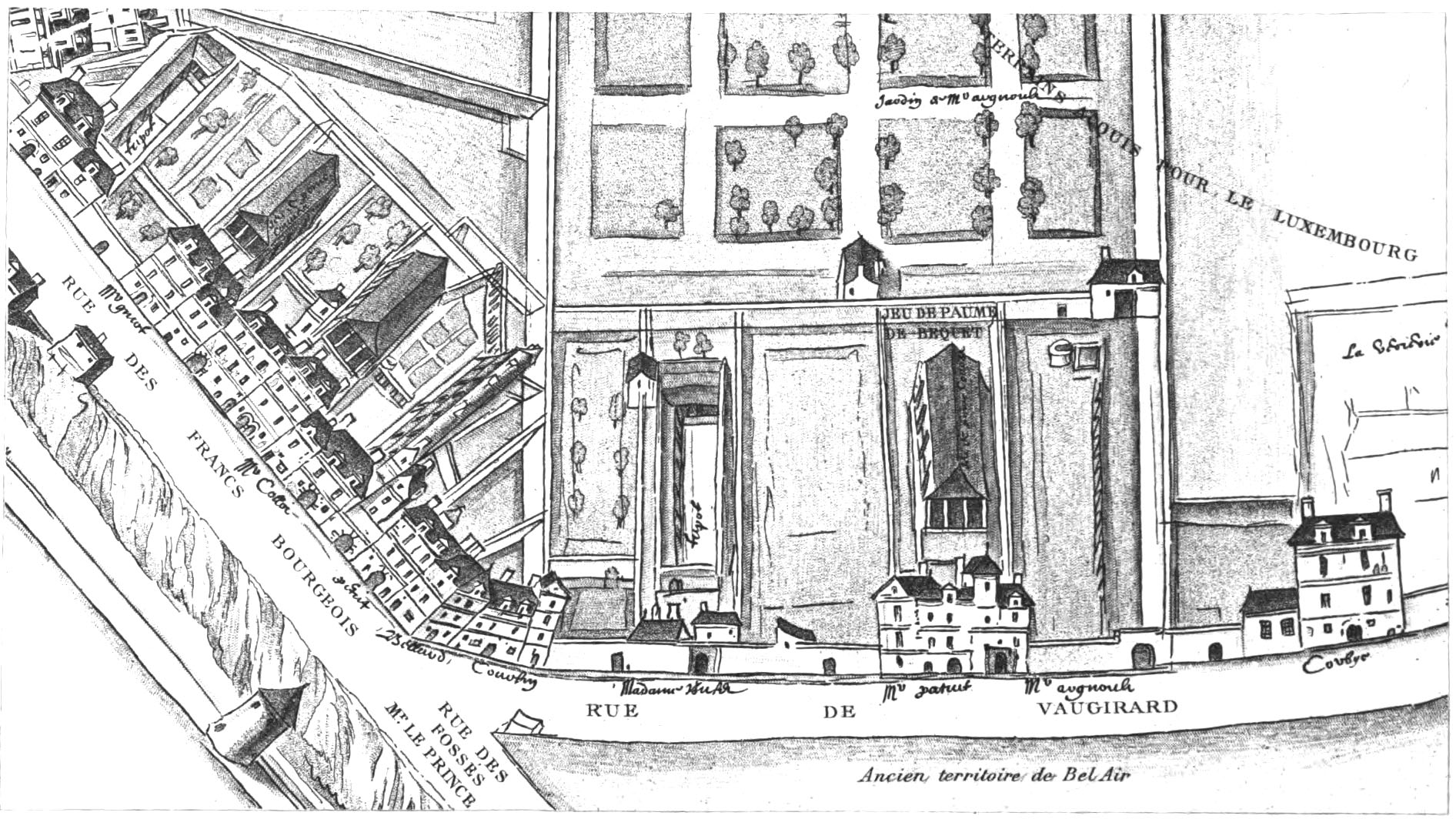
Jeu de Paume de Béquet on a 1615 enlargement of a section of the 1609 Quesnel map of Paris

The Salle du Bel-Air (French pronunciation: [sal dy bɛlɛʁ]) or Salle du Jeu de Paume de Béquet ([sal dy ʒø də pom də bekɛ], Hall of the Béquet Tennis Court), also spelled Becquet, was a 1672 theatre located in Paris, France. Originally an indoor tennis court (jeu de paume) it was converted by the Italian designer Carlo Vigarani into a theatre which was used by Jean-Baptiste Lully's Paris Opera from 15 November 1672 to 1 February 1673. It was located in the Rue de Vaugirard, just west of the city moat (fossé) and the Rue des Fossés Monsieur-le-Prince (now the Rue Monsieur-le-Prince). Today the site of the former theatre extends into the Rue de Médicis, just south of no. 15 (or 13 bis) Rue de Vaugirard.

== History ==
Pierre Perrin, a poet and librettist, was given a monopoly to found an Academy of Opera in Music and French Verse on 28 June 1669. Perrin had already associated himself with Alexandre de Rieux, Marquis de Sourdéac, and the marquis's own associate François Bersac de Fondant, who styled himself Sieur de Champeron. Sourdéac and Champeron hired singers and took a lease on the Jeu de Paume de Béquet. The conversion to a theatre was well advanced (an amphithéâtre, boxes, and stage machinery had already been installed), when they were evicted for their failure to obtain proper authorisation from the police. Seeking new premises, they leased the Jeu de Paume de la Bouteille, which became the first theatre of the Paris Opera.

The composer Jean-Baptiste Lully persuaded Perrin to sell him his monopoly to perform opera, but this was disputed, and a royal decree in March 1672 transferred the monopoly to Lully. Unable to use the Salle de la Bouteille, since Sourdéac and Champeron still held the lease, Lully requested permission to use the Great Hall in the Louvre Palace on 3 June 1672. However, King Louis XIV denied that request, since the Louvre, as a royal palace, was not considered appropriate for performances that would be open to the public. As a result, on 12 August 1672, Lully acquired a lease on the Béquet. On the same day Sourdéac and Champeron's right to give performances at the Bouteille was revoked. This measure was particularly punitive, since their five-year lease of the Bouteille did not end for another three years.

On 23 August 1672, Lully hired the Italian stage designer Carlo Vigarani to remodel the theatre and to create the scenery for the first production, Lully's Les fêtes de l'Amour et de Bacchus, which opened on 11 November 1672. This was followed by his first tragédie lyrique, Cadmus et Hermione, on 27 April 1673. The theatre was equipped with stage machinery, but Lully regarded it as temporary. After Molière died on 17 February 1673, Lully convinced King Louis XIV to allow him to use Molière's theatre at the Palais-Royal free of charge.

== Bibliography ==
- Clarke, Jan (1998). The Guénégaud Theatre in Paris (1673–1680). Volume One: Founding, Design and Production. Lewiston, New York: Edwin Mellen Press. ISBN 9780773483927.
- Clarke, Jan (2007). The Guénégaud Theatre in Paris (1673–1680). Volume Three: The Demise of the Machine Play. Lewiston, NY: Edwin Mellen Press. ISBN 9780773453135.
- Harris-Warrick, Rebecca (1992). "Paris. 2. 1669–1725", vol. 3, pp. 856–858, in The New Grove Dictionary of Opera, 4 volumes, edited by Stanley Sadie. London: Macmillan. ISBN 9781561592289.
- Johnson, Victoria (2008). Backstage at the Revolution: How the Royal Paris Opera Survived the End of the Old Regime. Chicago: University of Chicago Press. ISBN 9780226401959.
- La Salle, Albert de (1875). Les Treize Salles de l'Opéra. Paris: Librairie Sartorius. Copy at Google Books. Notice bibliographique at the BnF.
- Nuitter, Charles; Thoinan, Ernest (1886). Les Origines de l'Opéra français (in French). Paris: E. Plon, Nourrit et Cie. Copies 1 and 2 at Google Books.
- Wild, Nicole ([1989]). Dictionnaire des théâtres parisiens au XIXe siècle: les théâtres et la musique. Paris: Aux Amateurs de livres. ISBN 9780828825863. ISBN 9782905053800 (paperback). View formats and editions at WorldCat.
