= Paris Opera =

Opera and ballet company of France

- Opéra national de Paris
- Logo of the Paris Opera

- Palais Garnier (top) and Opéra Bastille (bottom), today's homes of the Paris Opera.
- Type: Opera and ballet company
- Location: Paris, France
- Website: operadeparis.fr

The Paris Opera (French: Opéra de Paris [ɔpeʁa də paʁi]) is the primary opera and ballet company of France. It was founded in 1669 by Louis XIV as the Académie d'Opéra, and shortly thereafter was placed under the leadership of Jean-Baptiste Lully and officially renamed the Académie Royale de Musique, but continued to be known more simply as the Opéra. Classical ballet as it is known today arose within the Paris Opera as the Paris Opera Ballet and has remained an integral and important part of the company. Currently called the Opéra national de Paris, it mainly produces operas at its modern 2,723-seat theatre Opéra Bastille which opened in 1989, and ballets and some classical operas at the older 1,979-seat Palais Garnier which opened in 1875. Small scale and contemporary works are also staged in the 500-seat Amphitheatre under the Opéra Bastille.

The company's annual budget is in the order of 200 million euros, of which €100M come from the French state and €70M from box office receipts. With this money, the company runs the two houses and supports a large permanent staff, which includes the orchestra of 170, a chorus of 110 and the corps de ballet of 150.

Each year, the Paris Opera presents about 380 performances of opera, ballet and other concerts, to a total audience of about 800,000 people (of whom 17% come from abroad), with an average seat occupancy rate of 94%. In the 2012–2013 season, the Paris Opera presented 18 opera titles (two in a double bill), 13 ballets, 5 symphonic concerts and two vocal recitals, plus 15 other programmes. The company's training bodies are also active, with 7 concerts from the Atelier Lyrique and 4 programmes from the École de Danse.

== History ==
=== The Opera under Louis XIV ===
==== Pierre Perrin ====
The poet Pierre Perrin began thinking and writing about the possibility of French opera in 1655, more than a decade before the official founding of the Paris Opera as an institution. He believed that the prevailing opinion of the time that the French language was fundamentally unmusical was completely incorrect. Seventeenth-century France offered Perrin essentially two types of organization for realizing his vision: a royal academy or a public theater. In 1666 he proposed to the minister Colbert that "the king decree 'the establishment of an Academy of Poetry and Music' whose goal would be to synthesize the French language and French music into an entirely new lyric form."

Even though Perrin's original concept was of an academy devoted to discussions of French opera, the king's intention was in fact a unique hybrid of royal academy and public theatre, with an emphasis on the latter as an institution for performance. On 28 June 1669, Louis XIV signed the Privilège accordé au Sieur Perrin pour l'établissement d'une Académie d'Opéra en musique, & Vers François (Privilege granted to Sir Perrin for the establishment of an Academy of Opera in music, & French Verse). The wording of the privilège, based in part on Perrin's own writings, gave him the exclusive right for 12 years to found anywhere in France academies of opera dedicated to the performance of opera in French. He was free to select business partners of his choice and to set the price of tickets. No one was to have the right of free entry including members of the royal court, and no one else could set up a similar institution. Although it was to be a public theatre, it retained its status as royal academy in which the authority of the king as the primary stakeholder was decisive. The monopoly, originally intended to protect the enterprise from competition during its formative phase, was renewed for subsequent recipients of the privilege up to the early French Revolution. As Victoria Johnson points out, "the Opera was an organization by nature so luxurious and expensive in its productions that its very survival depended on financial protection and privilege."

Perrin converted the Bouteille tennis court, located on the Rue des Fossés de Nesles (now 42 Rue Mazarine), into a rectangular facility with provisions for stage machinery and scenery changes and a capacity of about 1200 spectators.

==== Jean-Baptiste Lully ====
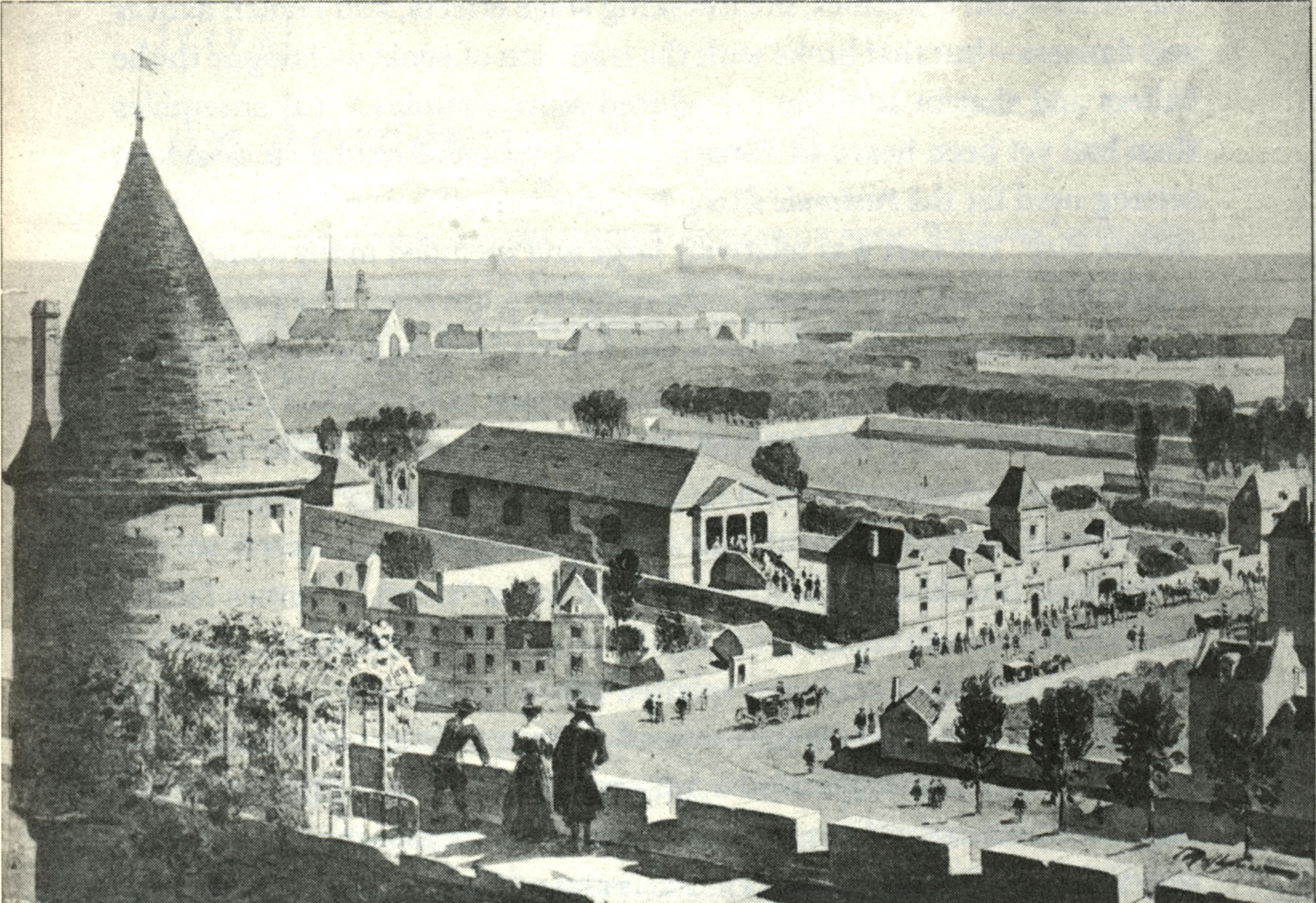
View of the Salle du Bel-Air

The institution was renamed the Académie Royale de Musique and came to be known in France simply as the Opéra. Within one month Lully had convinced the king to expand the privilege by restricting the French and Italian comedians to using two singers rather than six, and six instrumentalists, rather than twelve. Because of legal difficulties Lully could not use the Salle de la Bouteille, and a new theatre was built by Carlo Vigarani at the Bel-Air tennis court on the Rue de Vaugirard. Later, Lully and his successors bitterly negotiated the concession of the privilege, in whole or in part, from the entrepreneurs in the provinces: in 1684 Pierre Gautier bought the authorisation to open a music academy in Marseille, then the towns of Lyon, Rouen, Lille and Bordeaux followed suit in the following years. During Lully's tenure, the only works performed were his own. The first productions were the pastorale Les fêtes de l'Amour et de Bacchus (November 1672) and his first tragedie lyrique called Cadmus et Hermione (27 April 1673).

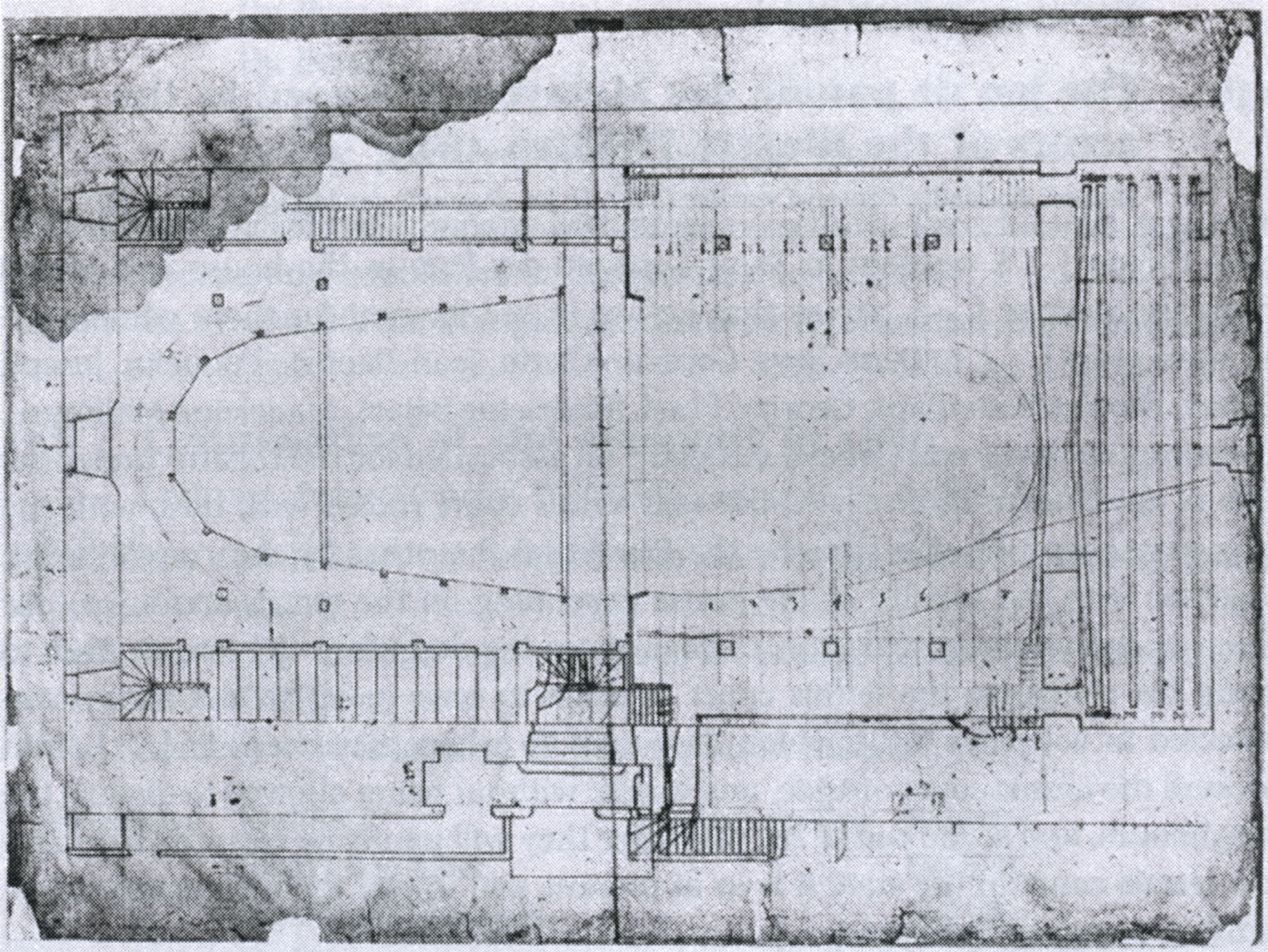
Vigarani's plan of the Salle du Palais-Royal

After Molière's death in 1673, his troupe merged with the players at the Théâtre du Marais to form the Théâtre Guénégaud (at the same theatre that had been used by the Académie d'Opéra), and no longer needed the theatre built by Richelieu at his residence the Palais-Royal, near the Louvre. (In 1680 the troupe at the Guénégaud merged again with the players from the Hôtel de Bourgogne forming the Comédie-Française.) Richelieu's theatre had been designed by Jacques Le Mercier and had opened in 1641, and unlike the huge theatre at the Tuileries Palace, which could accommodate 6,000 to 8,000 spectators, was of a size consistent with good acoustics. Lully greatly desired a better theatre and persuaded the king to let him use the one at the Palais-Royal free of charge. The Théâtre du Palais-Royal had been altered in 1660 and 1671, but Lully, with 3,000 livres received from the king, had further changes made by Vigarani in 1674.

The first production in the new theatre was Alceste on 19 January 1674. The opera was bitterly attacked by those enraged at the restrictions that Lully had caused to be placed on the French and Italian comedians. To mitigate the damage, Louis XIV arranged for new works to be premiered at the court, usually at the Chateau Vieux of the Château de Saint-Germain-en-Laye. This had the further advantage of subsidizing the cost of rehearsals, as well as most of the machinery, sets, and costumes, which were donated to the Opéra for use in Paris. During Lully's time at the Opéra, performances were given all year, except for three weeks at Easter. Regular performances were on Tuesdays, Fridays, and Sundays. The premieres presented at court were usually during Carnival and were moved to the Palais-Royal after Easter, where the openings were on Thursdays. About two to three new works were mounted each year. In all, thirteen of Lully's tragédie en musique were performed there (see the list of compositions by Jean-Baptiste Lully).

==== After Lully ====
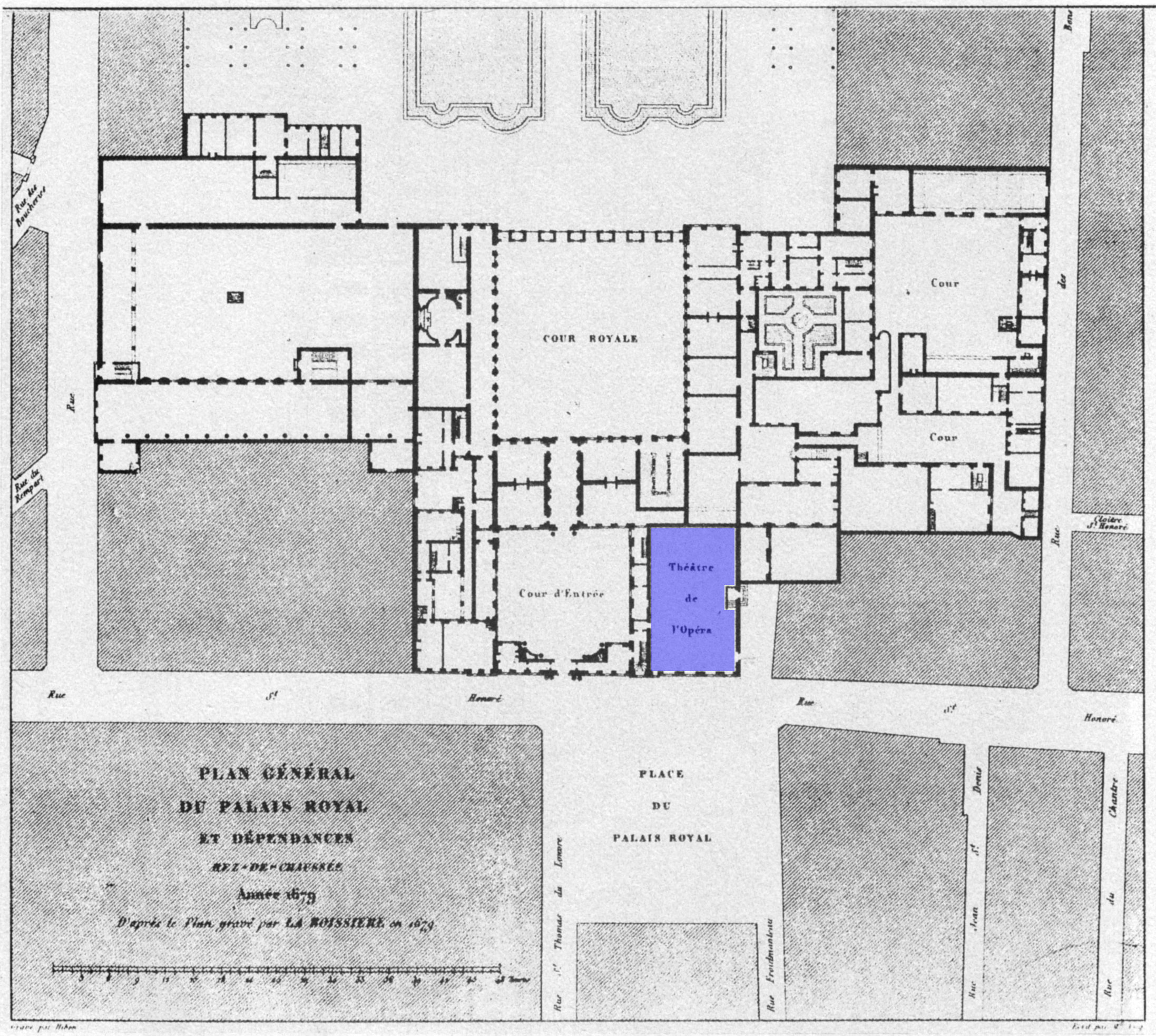
Plan of the Palais-Royal in 1679 showing the location of the Paris Opera's theatre (in blue)

After Lully died (in 1687), the number of new works per year almost doubled, since his successors (Pascal Collasse, Henri Desmarets, André Campra, André Cardinal Destouches, and Marin Marais) had greater difficulty sustaining the interest of the public. Revivals of Lully's works were common. French composers at the Opéra generally wrote music to new librettos, which had to be approved by the directors of the company. The Italian practice of preparing new settings of existing librettos was considered controversial and did not become the norm in Paris until around 1760. One of the most important of the new works during this period was an opéra-ballet by Campra called L'Europe galante presented in 1697.

==== Ballet ====
In 1661 Louis XIV, who was a dancer himself and one of the great architects of baroque ballet (the art form which would one day evolve into classical ballet), established the Académie Royale de Danse, intended to codify court and character dances and to certify dance teachers by examination. From 1680 until Lully's death, it was under the direction of the great dancing master Pierre Beauchamp, the man who codified the five positions of the feet. When Lully took over the Opéra in 1672, he and Beauchamp made theatrical ballet an important part of the company's productions. The ballet of that time was merely an extension of the opera, having yet to evolve into an independent form of theatrical art. As it became more important, however, the dance component of the company began to be referred to as the Paris Opera Ballet. In 1713 an associated ballet school was opened, today known as the Paris Opera Ballet School. The Académie Royale de Danse remained separate, and with the fall of the monarchy in 1789 it disappeared.

=== The company after the Revolution and in the 19th century ===
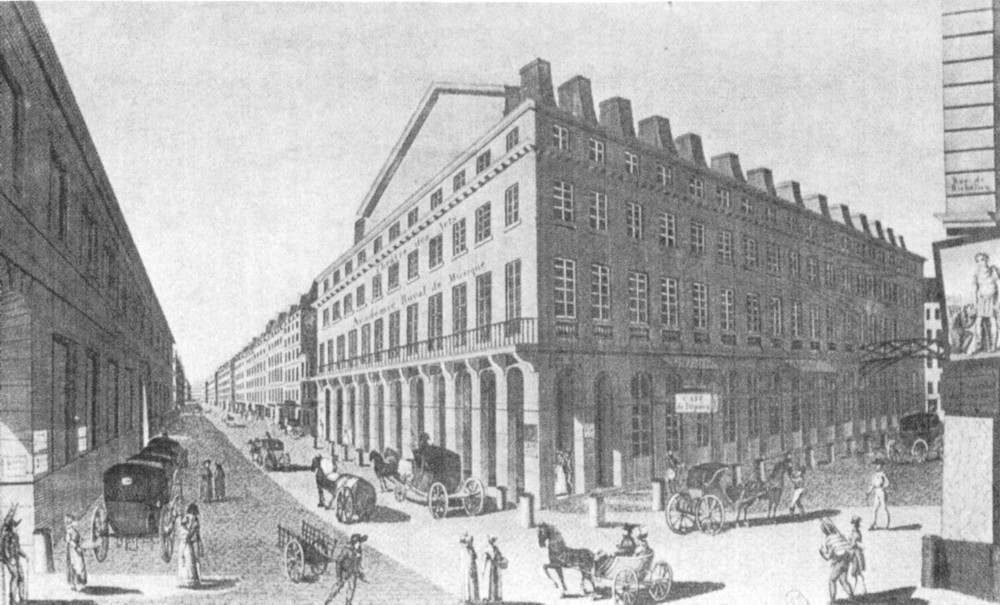
The Théâtre des Arts, principal venue of the Paris Opera from 1794 to 1820

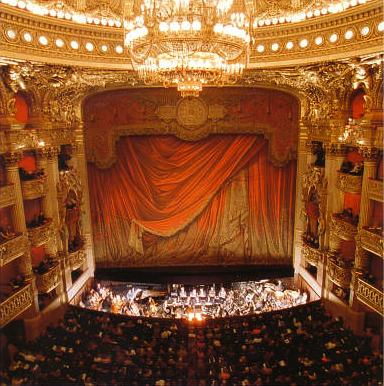
The Palais Garnier, view of the scene

With the French Revolution and the founding of the Republic, the company changed names several times, dropping its association with the royal family (see the List of official company names for details), and in 1794, moved into the Théâtre National de la rue de la Loi (capacity 2800) where it took the name Théâtre des Arts. In 1797, it was renamed the Théâtre de la République et des Arts.

Napoleon took control of the company in 1802 and with the declaration of the French Empire in 1804, renamed the company the Académie Impériale de Musique. With the Restoration in 1814, the company was renamed the Académie Royale de Musique. It became part of the Académie des Beaux-Arts in 1816. In 1821, the company moved to the Salle Le Peletier, which had a capacity of 1900 spectators and where it remained until the building was destroyed by fire in 1873.

In the second half of the 19th century, with the ascension of Napoleon III in 1851, the name Académie Impériale de Musique was reinstated and after 1870 with the formation of the Third Republic, was changed to Théâtre National de l'Opéra. In 1875, the institution occupied a new home, the Palais Garnier.

=== 20th century ===
Between 1908 and 1914 Henri Benjamin Rabaud conducted at Palais Garnier. Rabaud also composed several works which first premiered at Opéra-Comique, but were later also performed at Palais Garnier.

In 1939, the Opéra was merged with the Opéra-Comique and the company name became Réunion des Théâtres Lyriques Nationaux. The Opéra-Comique was closed in 1972 with the appointment of Rolf Liebermann as general administrator of the Théâtre National de l'Opéra de Paris (1973–1980), but in 1976, the Opéra-Comique was restored.

In 1990, the Opéra moved its primary venue to the new Opéra-Bastille, becoming the Opéra de Paris, although it continued to mount productions, primarily ballet, at the Palais Garnier; and the Opéra-Comique regained its autonomy. In 1994 the Opéra de Paris became the Opéra National de Paris. Regardless of all the changes in its "official" name, the company and its theatres were commonly referred to as the Opéra.

=== 21st century ===
The current managing director of the Opéra is Alexander Neef, since September 2020. Past principal conductors and music directors of the Opéra have included Myung-whun Chung, James Conlon and Philippe Jordan. In April 2021, the Opéra announced the appointment of Gustavo Dudamel as its next music director, effective 1 August 2021, with an initial contract of 6 seasons. In May 2023, Dudamel announced his resignation as music director of the Opéra, effective August 2023. In January 2026, the Opéra announced the appointment of Semyon Bychkov as its next music director, effective 1 August 2028, with an initial contract of four years. Bychkov is scheduled to take the title of music director-designate of the Opéra on 1 August 2026.

==== Video streaming service ====
On 7 April 2023, the company launched a video streaming service, Paris Opera Play (or POP). The initial release consisted of 80 titles, including videos of operas, ballets, documentaries, and master classes. Subscribers can also watch video of live performances. Video is watched with a web browser: Google Chrome, Firefox, Microsoft Edge Chromium, and Safari are supported. Subtitles in French and English are available for most videos. To watch videos on a TV, one can use Chromecast or AirPlay; however the latter does not support subtitles. An alternative method, which supports subtitles, is to play the video on a computer connected to a TV with an HDMI cable. In March 2025, it was announced that Paris Opera Play had become available for streaming, with apps for Apple TV and Android TV.

== Gallery ==
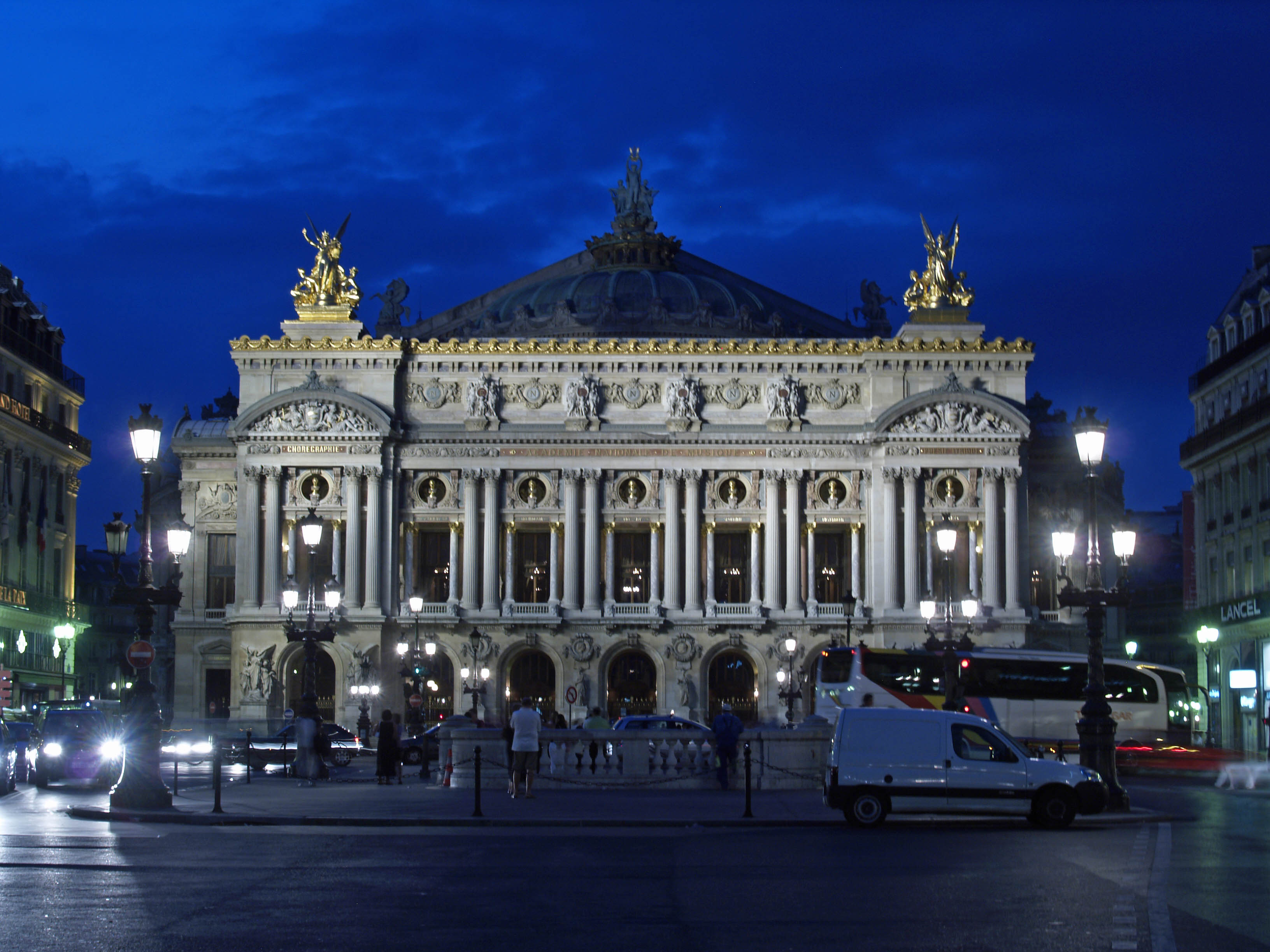
The Palais Garnier at night

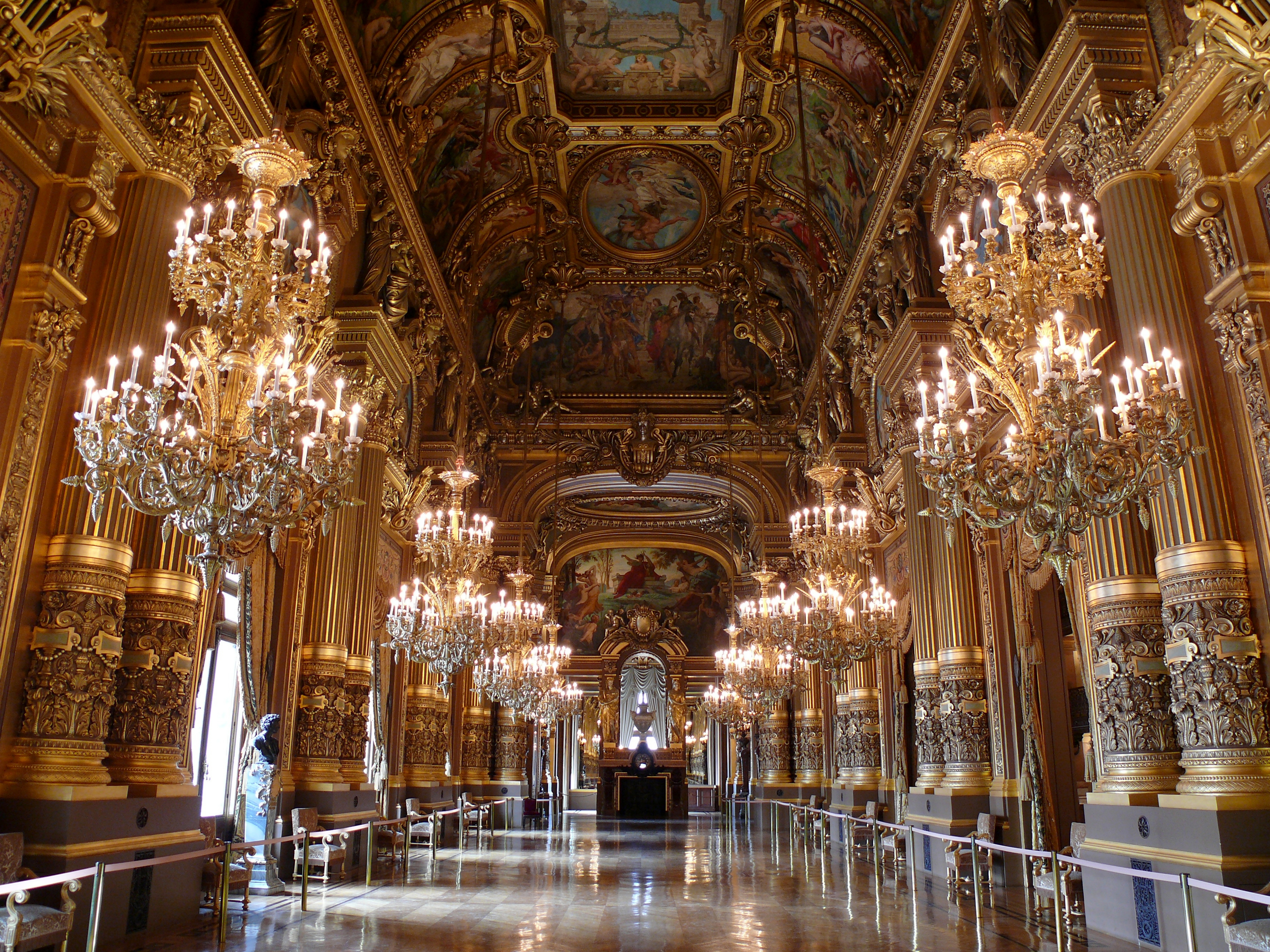
The Grand Foyer at the Palais Garnier

The Opéra Bastille inside

== List of official company names ==
Date	Official name	Notes	Ref
28 June 1669	Académie d'Opéra	Perrin granted license by Louis XIV	
13 March 1672	Académie Royale de Musique	Lully granted license by Louis XIV	
24 June 1791	Opéra	Louis XVI flees Paris (21 June)	
29 June 1791	Académie de Musique	Louis XVI returns to Paris (25 June)	
17 September 1791	Académie Royale de Musique	Royal family attends opera (20 September)	
15 August 1792	Académie de Musique	Louis XVI arrested (13 August)	
12 August 1793	Opéra	Ratification of the Constitution of 1793	
18 October 1793	Opéra National	Republican Calendar adopted (24 October)	
7 August 1794	Théâtre des Arts	Opéra moves to the Salle Montansier	
2 February 1797	Théâtre de la République et des Arts		
24 August 1802	Théâtre de l'Opéra		
29 June 1804	Académie Impériale de Musique	Napoleon Bonaparte installs the First French Empire (18 May)	
3 April 1814	Académie de Musique		
5 April 1814	Académie Royale de Musique	First Restoration (April)	
21 March 1815	Académie Impériale de Musique	Hundred Days of Napoleon (20 March)	
9 July 1815	Académie Royale de Musique	Second Restoration (8 July)	
4 August 1830	Théâtre de l'Opéra	Charles X abdicates (2 August)	
10 August 1830	Académie Royale de Musique	July Monarchy	
26 February 1848	Théâtre de la Nation	Second Republic	
29 March 1848	Opéra-Théâtre de la Nation		
2 September 1850	Académie Nationale de Musique		
2 December 1852	Académie Impériale de Musique	Second Empire (Napoleon III)	
1 July 1854	Théâtre Impérial de l'Opéra	Supervision assumed by Imperial Household	
4 September 1870	Théâtre de l'Opéra	Third Republic	
17 September 1870	Théâtre National de l'Opéra		
14 January 1939	Réunion des Théâtres Lyriques Nationaux	Opéra takes control of Opéra-Comique	
7 February 1978	Théâtre National de l'Opéra de Paris		
2 April 1990	Opéra de Paris	Move to the Opéra Bastille; Opéra-Comique regains autonomy	
5 February 1994	Opéra National de Paris		

== List of venues ==
Theatre	Dates used	Notes	Ref
Salle de la Bouteille	3 March 1671 – 1 April 1672	Located on the Rue Mazarine; eventually demolished.	
Salle du Bel-Air	10? November 1672 – June 1673	Located on the Rue de Vaugirard; also called Jeu de Paume de Béquet; eventually demolished.	
Salle du Palais-Royal (1st)	16 June 1673 – 6 April 1763	Built 1641; altered 1660, 1671, and 1674; destroyed by fire 6 April 1763.	
Salle des Tuileries	24 January 1764 – 23 January 1770	Remodeled first to a much smaller theatre by Soufflot.	
Salle du Palais-Royal (2nd)	26 January 1770 – 8 June 1781	Destroyed by fire 8 June 1781.	
Salle des Menus-Plaisirs	14 August – 23 October 1781	Located on the Rue Bergère; former theatre of the Opéra-Comique of the Foire St. Laurent; eventually demolished.	
Théâtre de la Porte Saint-Martin	27 October 1781 – 7 March 1794	Built in two months by Samson-Nicholas Lenoir at the request of Marie Antoinette.	
Théâtre National de la rue de la Loi	26 July 1794 – 13 February 1820	Montansier's 1793 theatre; street name restored to Rue de Richelieu in 1806; theatre demolished 1820; site now Square Louvois.	
Salle Favart (1st)	19 April 1820 – 11 May 1821	Theatre of the Opéra-Comique on the Place Boieldieu; destroyed by fire on 13–14 January 1838.	
Salle Louvois	25 May – 15 June 1821	Built in 1791; the company performed there 3 times: 25 May, and 1 and 15 June.	
Salle Le Peletier	16 August 1821 – 28 October 1873	Built on the Rue Le Peletier as temporary quarters; destroyed by fire 28–29 October 1873.	
Salle Ventadour	19 January 1874 – 30 December 1874	Shared the theatre with its long-time occupant the Théâtre-Italien until the Palais Garnier was completed.	
Palais Garnier	5 January 1875 – 29 June 1936	Designed by Charles Garnier; located at the Place de l'Opéra.	
Théâtre Sarah Bernhardt	1 August 1936 – 20 November 1936	Performed at this theatre while the Palais Garnier was under renovation.	
Théâtre des Champs-Élysées	30 November 1936 – 17 February 1937	Performed at this theatre while the Palais Garnier was under renovation.	
Palais Garnier	21 February 1937 – present	Reopened at the renovated theatre.	
Opéra Bastille	13 July 1989 – present	Designed by Carlos Ott; the official opening concert was on 13 July 1989 to celebrate the bicentennial of the French Revolution.	

== List of managing directors ==
Start date	Name	Administration
28 June 1669	Pierre Perrin	Royal Household
30 March 1672	Jean-Baptiste Lully	Royal Household
27 June 1687	Jean-Nicolas de Francine	Royal Household
30 December 1688	Jean Nicolas de Francine, Hyacinthe de Gauréault Dumont	Royal Household
7 October 1704	Pierre Guyenet	Royal Household
12 December 1712	Jean Nicolas de Francine, Hyacinthe de Gauréault Dumont	Royal Household
8 February 1728	André-Cardinal Destouches	Royal Household
1 June 1730	Maximilien-Claude Gruer	Royal Household
18 August 1731	Claude Lecomte (Opera director) Lebœuf	Royal Household
30 May 1733	Eugène de Thuret	Royal Household
18 March 1744	Jean-François Berger	Royal Household
3 May 1748	Joseph Guénot de Tréfontaine	Royal Household
25 August 1749	Louis-Basile de Bernage, Marquis d'Argenson, then François Rebel and François Francœur	City of Paris
1754	Joseph-Nicolas-Pancrace Royer	City of Paris
1755	Bontemps, Levasseur	City of Paris
13 March 1757	François Rebel, François Francœur	Royal Household
9 February 1767	Pierre Montan Berton, Jean-Claude Trial	Royal Household
9 November 1769	Pierre Montan Berton, Jean-Claude Trial, Antoine Dauvergne, Joliveau	City of Paris
18 April 1776	Direction by the Royal Commissioners	Royal Commissioners
18 October 1777	Jacques de Vismes	Royal Commissioners
19 February 1779	Jacques de Vismes	City of Paris
19 March 1780	Pierre Montan Berton	Royal Accountant
27 May 1780	Antoine Dauvergne, François-Joseph Gossec	Royal Accountant
8 April 1790		City of Paris
8 March 1792	Louis-Joseph Francœur, Jacques Cellerier (under committee headed by J.-J.Leroux)	Paris Commune (French First Republic)
17 September 1793	Committee of the Commune (with François Lays)	Paris Commune (French First Republic)
1 May 1797	Committee of the Commune	Paris Commune (French First Republic)
12 September 1799	Jacques Devisme (formerly Jacques de Vismes du Valgay), Joseph Bonet de Treyches	Paris Commune (French First Republic)
13 March 1800	Jacques Devisme	Paris Commune (French First Republic)
25 December 1800	Joseph Bonet de Treyches	Paris Commune (French First Republic)
19 December 1801	Jacques Cellerier	Paris Commune (French First Republic)
26 November 1802	Prefect Étienne Morel de Chefdeville, then Joseph Bonet de Treyches as Director	Prefects of the Palace
1 November 1807	Louis-Benoit Picard	Imperial Superintendents
3 April 1814	Louis-Benoit Picard	Royal Superintendents
18 January 1816	Denis Pierre Jean Papillon de la Ferté	Royal Superintendents
30 March 1817	Alexandre Étienne Choron	Royal Superintendents
30 October 1819	Giovanni-Battista Viotti	Royal Superintendents
1 November 1821	François-Antoine Habeneck	Royal Superintendents
26 November 1824	Raphaël Duplantys	Royal Superintendents
12 July 1827	Émile Timothée Lubbert	Royal Superintendents
2 March 1831	Louis-Désiré Véron	Franchised entrepreneurship with state subvention
15 August 1835	Henri Duponchel	Franchised entrepreneurship with state subvention
15 November 1839	Henri Duponchel, Édouard Monnais	Franchised entrepreneurship with state subvention
1 June 1840	Henri Duponchel, Édouard Monnais, Léon Pillet	Franchised entrepreneurship with state subvention
1 June 1841	Henri Duponchel, Léon Pillet	Franchised entrepreneurship with state subvention
October 1841	Léon Pillet	Franchised entrepreneurship with state subvention
1 August 1847	Léon Pillet, Henri Duponchel, Nestor Roqueplan	Franchised entrepreneurship with state subvention
24 November 1847	Henri Duponchel, Nestor Roqueplan	Franchised entrepreneurship with state subvention
21 November 1849	Nestor Roqueplan	Franchised entrepreneurship with state subvention
1 July 1854	Nestor Roqueplan	Imperial Household (Civil List)
11 November 1854	François-Louis Crosnier	Imperial Household (Civil List)
1 July 1856	Alphonse Royer	Imperial Household (Civil List)
20 December 1862	Émile Perrin	Imperial Household (Civil List)
11 April 1866	Émile Perrin	Franchised entrepreneurship with state subvention
1 October 1870	Émile Perrin	State administration
28 October 1870	Émile Perrin	Society of Artists with state subvention
9 May 1871	Eugène Garnier	Society of Artists with state subvention
3 July 1871	Émile Perrin	Society of Artists with state subvention
9 July 1871	Hyacinthe Halanzier	Society of Artists with state subvention
1 November 1871	Hyacinthe Halanzier	Private entrepreneurship with state subvention
16 July 1879	Auguste Vaucorbeil	Private entrepreneurship with state subvention
1 December 1884	Eugène Ritt, Pedro Gailhard	Private entrepreneurship with state subvention
1 January 1892	Eugène Bertrand, Édouard Colonne	Private entrepreneurship with state subvention
1 April 1893	Eugène Bertrand, Pedro Gailhard	Private entrepreneurship with state subvention
31 December 1899	Pedro Gailhard	Private entrepreneurship with state subvention
1907	Pedro Gailhard, Pierre Barthélemy Gheusi	Private entrepreneurship with state subvention
1 January 1908	Leimistin Broussan, André Messager	Private entrepreneurship with state subvention
1 January 1915	Jacques Rouché	Private entrepreneurship with state subvention
14 January 1939	Jacques Rouché	State administration: Réunion des Théâtres; Lyrique Nationaux (Opéra and Opéra-Comique merged under one administration, RTLN)
1940	Jacques Rouché (RTLN), Philippe Gaubert (Opéra)	State administration: Réunion des Théâtres; Lyrique Nationaux (Opéra and Opéra-Comique merged under one administration, RTLN)
1942	Jacques Rouché (RTLN), Marcel Samuel-Rousseau (Opéra)	State administration: Réunion des Théâtres; Lyrique Nationaux (Opéra and Opéra-Comique merged under one administration, RTLN)
21 February 1945	René Gadave (interim administrator)	State administration: Réunion des Théâtres; Lyrique Nationaux (Opéra and Opéra-Comique merged under one administration, RTLN)
27 June 1945	Maurice Lehmann (RTLN), Reynaldo Hahn (Opéra)	State administration: Réunion des Théâtres; Lyrique Nationaux (Opéra and Opéra-Comique merged under one administration, RTLN)
12 May 1946	Georges Hirsch (RTLN), Henri Büsser (Opéra)	State administration: Réunion des Théâtres; Lyrique Nationaux (Opéra and Opéra-Comique merged under one administration, RTLN)
17 November 1951	Maurice Lehmann (RTLN), Emmanuelle Bondville (Opéra)	State administration: Réunion des Théâtres; Lyrique Nationaux (Opéra and Opéra-Comique merged under one administration, RTLN)
30 September 1955	Jacques Ibert (RTLN), Emmanuelle Bondville (Opéra)	State administration: Réunion des Théâtres; Lyrique Nationaux (Opéra and Opéra-Comique merged under one administration, RTLN)
13 April 1956	Georges Hirsch (RTLN), Emmanuelle Bondville (Opéra)	State administration: Réunion des Théâtres; Lyrique Nationaux (Opéra and Opéra-Comique merged under one administration, RTLN)
August 1959	A.-M. Julien (RTLN), Emmanuelle Bondville (Opéra)	State administration: Réunion des Théâtres; Lyrique Nationaux (Opéra and Opéra-Comique merged under one administration, RTLN)
19 April 1962	Georges Auric (RTLN), Emmanuelle Bondville (Opéra)	State administration: Réunion des Théâtres; Lyrique Nationaux (Opéra and Opéra-Comique merged under one administration, RTLN)
September 1968	André Chabaud (interim director)	State administration: Réunion des Théâtres; Lyrique Nationaux (Opéra and Opéra-Comique merged under one administration, RTLN)
1 October 1969	René Nicoly	State administration: Réunion des Théâtres; Lyrique Nationaux (Opéra and Opéra-Comique merged under one administration, RTLN)
23 May 1971	Jean-Yves Daniel-Lesur (RTLN), Bernard Lefort (Opéra)	State administration: Réunion des Théâtres; Lyrique Nationaux (Opéra and Opéra-Comique merged under one administration, RTLN)
1 January 1972	Rolf Liebermann	(Opéra-Comique closed)
7 February 1978	Rolf Liebermann	Théâtre National de l'Opéra de Paris
31 July 1980	Bernard Lefort	Théâtre National de l'Opéra de Paris
September 1982	Interim committee: Paul Puaux Jean-Pierre Leclerc, Alain Lombard, Georges-François Hirsch	Théâtre National de l'Opéra de Paris
1 August 1983	Massimo Bogianckino	Théâtre National de l'Opéra de Paris
24 September 1985		Théâtre National de l'Opéra de Paris
12 February 1986	Jean-Louis Martinoty	
13 July 1989	Jean-Louis Martinoty	(Opéra Bastille opens)
1 September 1989	Jean-Albert Cartier (general administrator of the Palais Garnier)	
2 April 1990	Pierre Bergé (president)	Opéra de Paris (Opéra-Comique reopens)
15 May 1991	Georges-François Hirsch (general administrator of the Palais Garnier)	
1 September 1992	Brigitte Lefèvre (general administrator of the Palais Garnier)	
5 February 1994		Opéra National de Paris
15 February 1994	Jean-Paul Cluzel (inspector general of finances)	
1 August 1995	Hugues Gall	
September 2004	Gerard Mortier	
1 August 2009	Nicolas Joel	
1 August 2014	Stéphane Lissner	
1 September 2020	Alexander Neef	

== Other Parisian opera companies and theatres ==
In the period from 1725 to 1791 there were essentially four public theatres which were permitted in Paris:

- Opéra de Paris
- Comédie-Française
- Comédie-Italienne
- Opéra-Comique

In 1762, the Opéra-Comique merged with the Comédie-Italienne.

In 1791, the laws were changed allowing almost anyone to open a public theatre. This led to rapid growth in the number of theatres and companies and complexities in their naming. Theatres might burn down and be rebuilt using the name of an old or new company or patron. Some of the new theatres that appeared during this period include:

- Théâtre Feydeau
- Théâtre Italien
- Théâtre Lyrique
- Théâtre de l'Ambigu-Comique
- Théâtre des Bouffes-Parisiens
- Cirque Olympique
- Théâtre de la Gaîté
- Gymnase-Dramatique
- Théâtre des Nouveautés
- Théâtre de l'Odeon
- Porte-St-Martin
- Théâtre de la Renaissance
- Théâtre des Variétés
- Théâtre du Vaudeville

After about 1870, the situation was simpler with regard to opera, with primarily the Opéra and the Opéra-Comique in operation. The naming situation became somewhat confusing after the Opéra-Comique's theater (the second Salle Favart) burned on 25 May 1887, since the company began performing in other locations. Companies other than the Opéra producing operas or operettas at various theatres in this period included:

- Opéra-Comique at Salle Favart (2), Théâtre Lyrique, Théâtre du Château-d'Eau, Salle Favart (3)
- Opéra National Lyrique at Théâtre de la Gaîté
- Eden-Théâtre (Lohengrin, 1887)
- Opéra Populaire performing at Théâtre du Châtelet, Théâtre de la Gaîté, and Théâtre du Château-d'Eau
- Théâtre du Château-d'Eau
- Théâtre Lyrique performing at Salle de l'Athénée, Théâtre du Château-d'Eau, and Théâtre de la Renaissance
- Nouveau-Lyrique at Théâtre Taitbout
- Théâtre de l'Odéon (plays with incidental music by, e.g. Bizet, Fauré)
- Théâtre de la Ville
- Théâtre du Châtelet
- Théâtre des Champs-Élysées

== See also ==
- List of theatres and entertainment venues in Paris
- Opéra (Paris Métro)
- Category:Opera world premieres at the Paris Opera
- The Phantom of the Opera
