= Georges-François Hirsch =

French stage director (born 1944)

Georges-François Hirsch (born 5 October 1944 in the 14th arrondissement of Paris) is a French stage director.

He is the son of Georges Hirsch (1895–1974), former administrator of the Réunion des théâtres lyriques nationaux.

He was co-director of the Paris Opéra (1981–1983), general director of the Théâtre des Champs-Élysées in Paris (1983–1990), then director of the Carcassonne Festival in 1989. He was general administrator of the Opéra Bastille at its opening (1989), then of the entire Paris Opera from 1991 to 1992. He was general director of the Orchestre de Paris from 1996 to 2008.

He also holds various administrative positions: member of the Conseil supérieur de l'audiovisuel from 1993 to 1996, director of music, theatre, dance and entertainment at the French ministry of Culture from 2008 to 2010.

On 13 January 2010, he was appointed first director of the Direction générale de la Création artistique in the same ministry. Michel Orier succeeded him on 1 September 2012.
