= Leimistin Broussan =

French theatre and opera manager

Leimistin Broussan (3 November 1858 – 1 October 1959) was a French theatre and opera manager.

== Life ==
Born in Vauvert (Gard department), Broussan successively directed the municipal theatre of Brest (1898–1899), the municipal theatre of Nancy (1899–1902) then the Théâtre des Célestins and the Grand Théâtre de Lyon (1902–1906), before becoming co-director, with André Messager, of the Paris Opera from 1908 to 1914.

He married Madeleine Lagarde, daughter of Paul Lagarde (1851–1903) and Jeanne Samary.

Broussan died in Paris on 1 October 1959.

== Awards ==
- Chevalier of the Légion d'honneur
- Officier of the Ordre des Palmes Académiques
- Commandeur of the Order of Saint Anna
- Commandeur of the Order of the Polar Star
- Commandeur of the Order of Leopold

== Sources ==
- Alain Duault, L'Opéra de Paris, 1989

Preceded by Eugène Bertrand and Pedro Gailhard	Director of the Paris Opera; 1908-1914; With: André Messager	Succeeded by Jacques Rouché
