= Eugène Ritt =

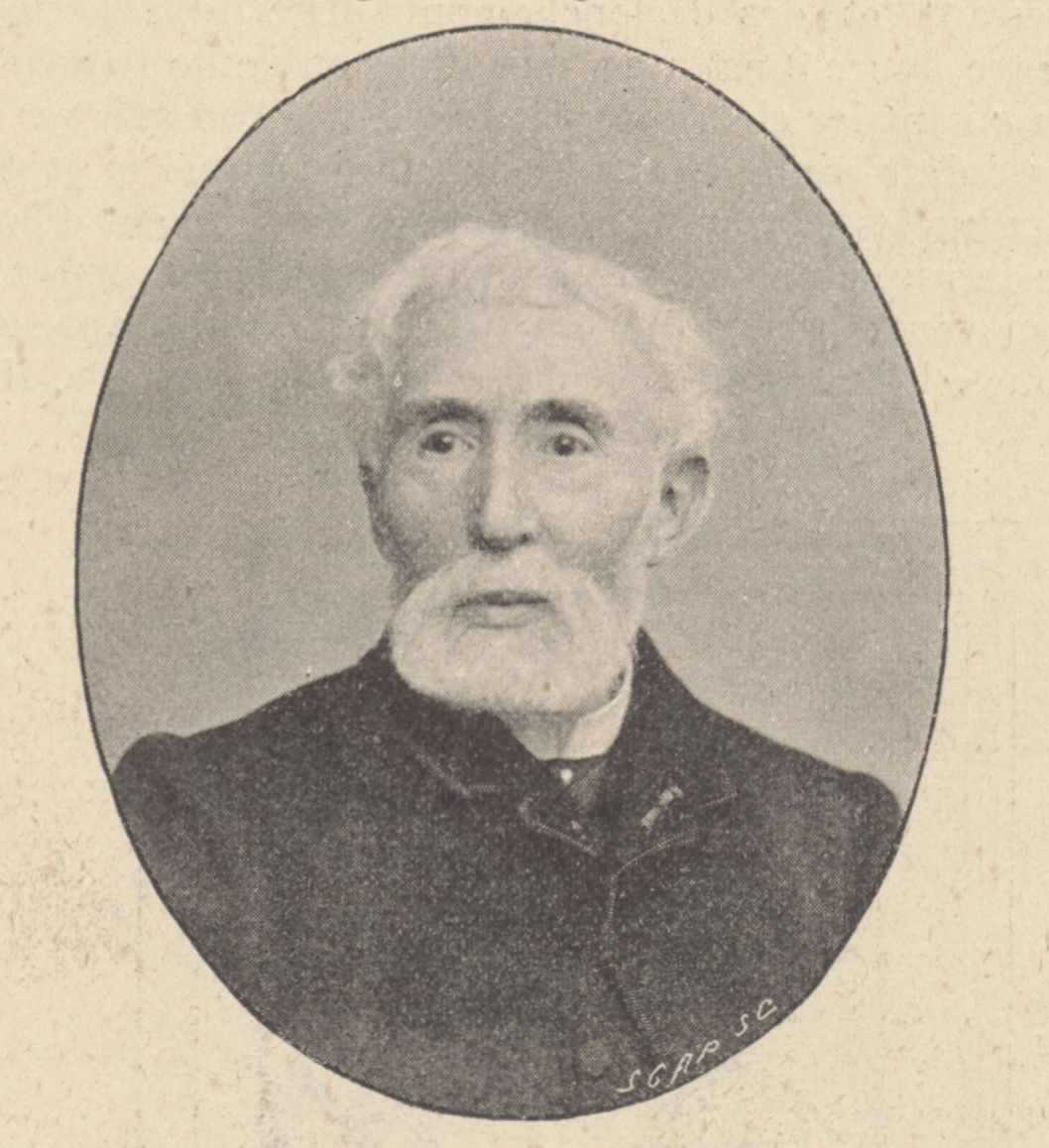
Eugène Ritt

Jean Eugène Ritt (23 March 1817 – 11 March 1898) was a French actor and theatre director.

== Life ==
Ritt was born in Paris into the lower middle class, and raised in Strasbourg. Back in Paris, around 1834, he improvised himself an actor, organizing performances on suburban stages. In 1840, he performed at the Théâtre de l'Ambigu-Comique. Le Figaro indicated that, as an actor, he was "of modest art". Businessman, skillful and ingenious merchant, he sold mechanical leeches and meat, practiced open outcry at the carreau des halles, one of the organizers of this butchery system.

In 1856, he became an administrator, associated with Charles de Chilly, in the management, until 1862, of the Ambigu where were successively represented Les Fugitifs, Les Beaux Messieurs de Bois-Doré, Fanfan-la-Tulipe, La Bouquetière des Innocents. Still according to Le Figaro, Chilly said, "This Ritt has two great qualities, he is thrifty and lucky!".

From 1862 to 1870, he presided over the destiny of the theatre of the Opéra-Comique, in association with Adolphe de Leuven.

In 1872, he decided to rebuild the Théâtre de la Porte-Saint-Martin which was burned down in 1871 during the Paris Commune and in 1873. Ritt took over, with Henri Larochelle, the rebuilt theatre of the Porte-Saint-Martin, for six years, during which they set up Le Tour du monde en quatre-vingts jours by Adolphe d'Ennery and Jules Verne. The play will be performed continuously from November 7, 1874 to December 20, 1875 (415 performances). To understand the public's enthusiasm, it is enough to quote a letter from Victor Hugo to Ritt and Larochelle: "My excellent and dear directors, my whole household wants to review and repeat the Autour du Monde, this amazing success. Do you want to be good enough to give them four tickets for tonight on Tuesday. Cordial thanks." The play brought in about fifteen hundred thousand francs for each of the two directors. At the same time, he directed the Théâtre du Châtelet which he saved from bankruptcy.

In 1877, with his partner Henri Larochelle, he took over the management of the Théâtre de l'Ambigu-Comique. Henri Chabrillat succeeded them as director in 1878.

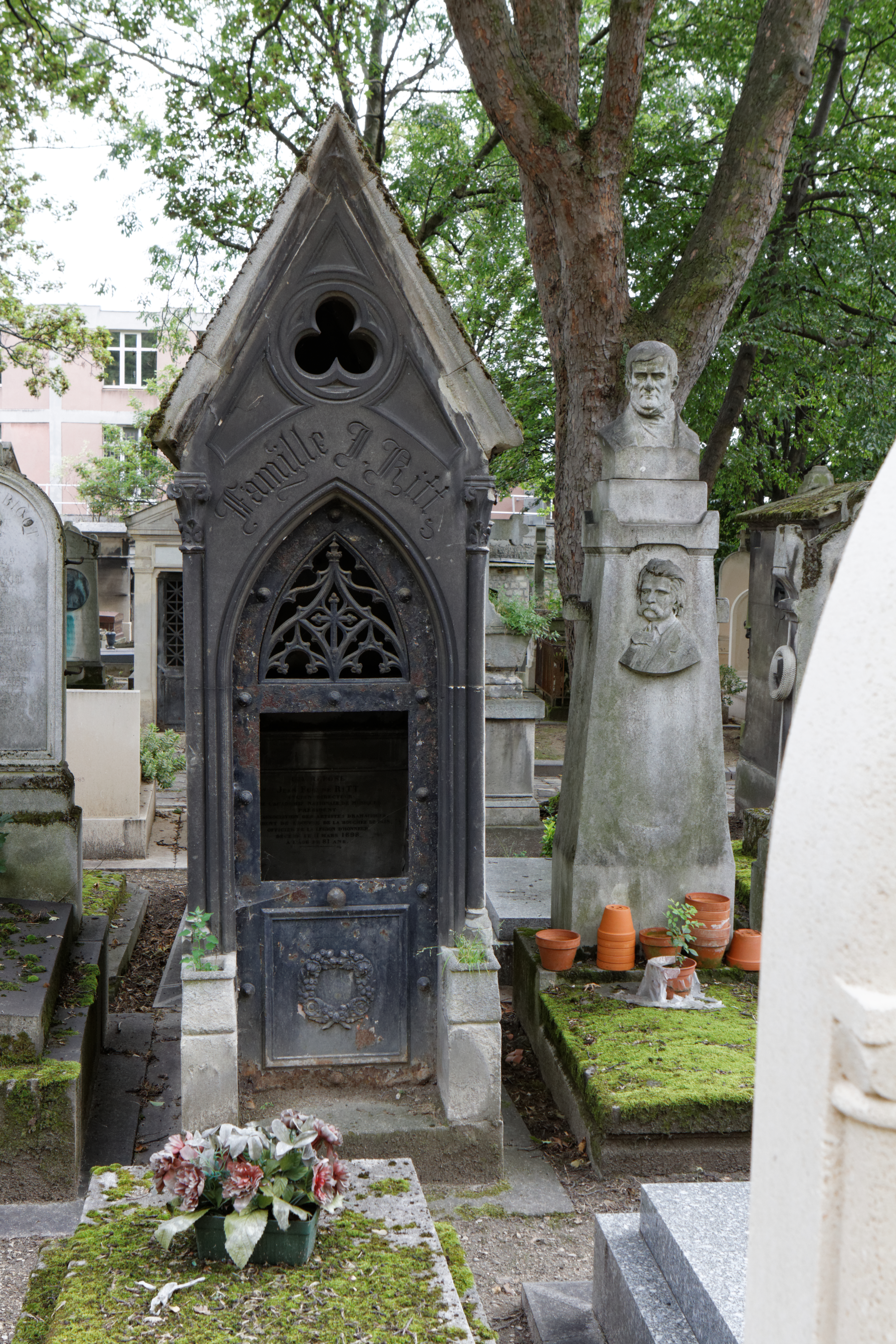
Grave at the Père Lachaise Cemetery

In 1884, he was appointed director of the Paris Opera and took Pedro Gailhard as director of the stage. The first year was disastrous; the grant and sponsorship absorbed and the Opera became prosperous again. They produce a large number of new works, including Taharin, Massenet's Le Cid, Rigoletto, Sigurd (1885); Patrie !, Les Deux Pigeons (1886); Gounod's Roméo et Juliette (1888); La Tempête, Lucia di Lamermoor (1889); Ascanio, Zaïre, Le Rêve (1890); Le Mage (1891), Saint Saëns' Henry VIII. Richard Wagner's repertoire made its first appearance at the Opera. In 1890, the privilege was withdrawn. He then became a philanthropist. He was unanimously appointed President of the Association of Dramatic Artists and President of the "La Bouchée de Pain" foundation.

In 1884, he was elected municipal councillor of Épinay-sous-Sénart, where he resided for many years. In 1869, he bought a magnificent property in the city and had a house built there in 1891, now the town hall of this city.

Ritt is buried at the cimetière du Père-Lachaise (32nd division).

== Family ==
He first married Henriette Sarah Weller (1817-1876) on 6 January 1844 then Rose Rachel Veller (1836-1908) on 7 January 1878. After his death in 1898, his widow, Rose Veller, adopted their young protégée, Charlotte Lesbros (1878-1965) who inherited Épinay-sous-Sénart's property, and married Jacques Froment-Meurice (1864-1947), nephew of playwright Paul Meurice.

== Awards ==
Chevalier of the Legion of Honour, 29 December 1885, then officier, 12 July 1891.

Preceded by Auguste Vaucorbeil	director of the Paris Opera (with Pedro Gailhard); 1885-1891	Succeeded by Eugène Bertrand
