= Claude Lecomte (opera director) =

Claude Lecomte was an 18th-century French financier who participated in the direction of the Académie Royale de musique on two occasions between 1730 and 1733.

Before taking an interest in the Opera, he was a sub-farmer of the subsidies of the Généralité de Paris. On May 19, 1730, he joined Maximilien-Claude Gruer, Abraham Coussard and François Le Bœuf de Vaudahon in a company that would support Gruer, who had received the privilege of the Opera.

But relations between partners stretched very quickly, and on 18 October, Gruer decided to form a new association with Mogniac and Hennes. Lecomte protested and refused to transfer the rights he had taken in the company. However, it eventually gave in under pressure from the secrétaire d'État de la Maison du roi.

However, he tried to denigrate Gruer to take his place. The opportunity was found when the director of the Opera was involved in a scandal with singers from the Académie.

The king was forced to withdraw the management from Gruer and the privilege was finally granted on 18 August 1731 to Claude Lecomte, who managed the Opera with François Le Bœuf.

But it was soon revealed that Claude Lecomte's son, who had been entrusted by his father with the task of running the cash register, was committing irregularities. This time, it is Lecomte who was the victim of the scandal. However, he did not withdraw immediately, as Louis XV had not approved the Count of Saint-Gillet and the Baron de Frentz, who had applied for the takeover.

Finally, Eugène de Thuret's candidacy was accepted on March 22, 1733 and Lecomte had to withdraw.

== Source ==
Jean Gourret, Ces hommes qui ont fait l'Opéra, p. 44-46.
