= Pedro Gailhard =

French opera singer and theatre director

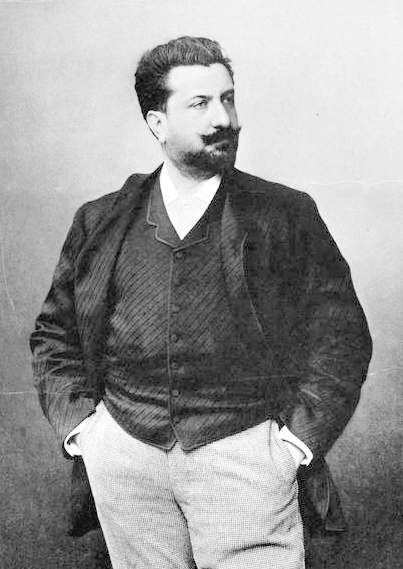
- Born: Pierre Samson Gailhard; 1 August 1848; Toulouse
- Died: 12 October 1918 (aged 70); Paris
- Occupation(s): Opera singer, theatre director

Pedro or Pierre Gailhard, full name Pierre Samson Gailhard, (1 August 1848 – 12 October 1918) was a French opera singer and theatre director.

Gifted with an exceptional singing bass voice, Pedro Gailhard made his debut at the Opéra-Comique in December 1867, then sang at the Opéra Garnier, as Mephisto in Faust by Charles Gounod in 1871, a role which he also sang at Covent Garden. His interprétation of Leporello in Don Giovanni by Mozart was considered remarkable, as was his portrayal of other roles, such as Osmin in Mozart's Die Entführung aus dem Serail, Kaspar in Weber's Der Freischütz, the King in Thomas' Hamlet, Pythéas in Gounod's Sapho, Saint-Bris and Nevers in Meyerbeer's Les Huguenots, and Faust in Boito's Mefistofele.

Pedro Gailhard was the first lyric artist to be named director of the Paris Opera, which he headed from 1884 to 1891 and from 1893 to 1907. He was mentioned as such in the novel The Phantom of the Opera by Gaston Leroux.

== Bibliography ==
- Anne-Marie Gouiffès, Pedro Gailhard, un artiste lyrique à la direction de l'Opéra de Paris. 1884-1907, 2000, thèse, dir. D. Pistone, Université Paris Sorbonne.
- Fontaine, Gerard (2003). Visages de marbre et d'airain: La collection de bustes du Palais Garnier. Paris: Monum, Éditions du patrimoine. ISBN 978-2-85822-751-8.
- Kutsch, K. J.; Riemens, Leo (2003). Großes Sängerlexikon (fourth edition, in German). Munich: K. G. Saur. ISBN 978-3-598-11598-1.

Preceded by Auguste-Emmanuel Vaucorbeil	director of the Paris Opera; 1884-1891; With: Eugène Ritt	Succeeded by Eugène Bertrand
Preceded by Eugène Bertrand	director of the Paris Opera; 1893-1907	Succeeded by André Messager and Leimistin Broussan
