= Georges Hirsch =

French theatre director (1895–1974)

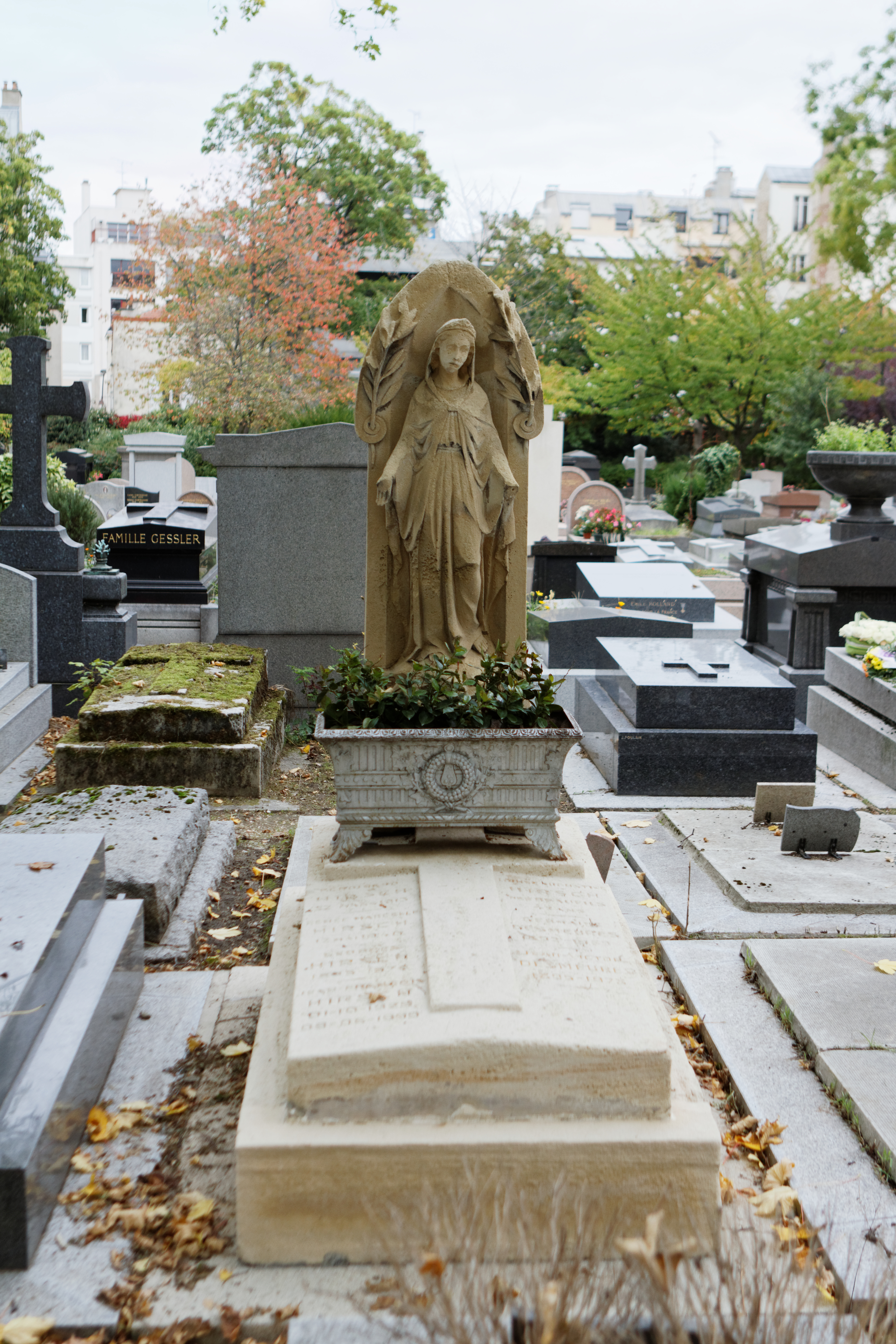
Grave at Père-Lachaise Cemetery

Georges Hirsch (22 February 1895 – 12 May 1974) was a French theater director, a member of the French Resistance, and municipal councillor of Paris.

He was a director of the Paris Opera from 1946 to 1951 and from 1956 to 1959. Married to the singer Madeleine Mathieu, he is the father of Professor Jean-François Hirsch, creator of the first paediatric neurosurgery department at the Necker-Enfants Malades Hospital and of Georges-François Hirsch, also director of several Parisian theatres.

== Life ==
Hirsch was born in the 19th arrondissement of Paris in 1895 A member of the SFIO, he was appointed municipal councillor of Paris and general councillor of the former Seine department from 1933 to 1940. At the Conseil municipal de Paris, Hirsch must face anti-Semitism from Louis Darquier de Pellepoix, who does not hesitate to come to blows:

Over and over again, Darquier opposes within the Council itself with his Jewish colleagues on the definition of what is being "French". Reactionary tradition versus Republican tradition. Maurice Hirschovitz, Georges Hirsch, Raphaël Schneid, all three have at one time or another claimed that they were "more French" than him. At the end of the session [of June 4, 1936], he [Darquier de Pellepoix] waited in the Council's changing rooms for the "dirty little Jew" in question, Georges Hirsch, and committed an attack on him that quickly turned into a brawl between colleagues.

Re-elected from 1944 to 1945, then from 1959 to 1965, he was appointed head of the Réunion des théâtres lyriques nationaux from 1946 to 1951 and from 1956 to 1959. In this capacity, he chaired the jury of the International singing competition of Toulouse on 2 occasions.

Hirsh died in the 16th arrondissement of Paris in 1974 and was buried at Père Lachaise Cemetery (89th division).

Preceded by Maurice Lehmann	administrator of the Réunion des théâtres lyriques nationaux 1946-1951	Succeeded by Maurice Lehmann
Preceded by Jacques Ibert	administrator of the Réunion des théâtres lyriques nationaux 1956-1959	Succeeded by A.-M. Julien
