= Eugène Bertrand =

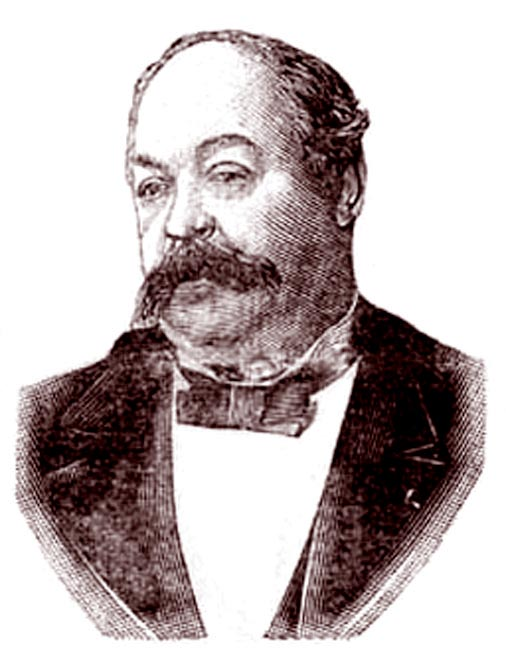
- Born: 15 January 1834; Paris
- Died: 30 December 1899 (aged 65); Paris
- Occupation(s): Comedian, theatre managing director

Signature
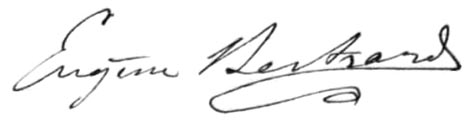

Eugène Bertrand (15 January 1834 – 30 December 1899) was a French comedian, theatre managing director and opera house director.

== Life ==
Born in Paris, he made his debut in the theatre at the Théâtre des Jeunes-Artistes then at the Théâtre de l'Odéon in Paris. From 1859 to 1865, he was a comedian then theatre manager in the United-States. In 1865, he was hired at the Théâtre du Parc in Brussels, before he briefly managed the two theatres in Lille (northern France). He then was managing director of the Théâtre des Variétés from 1869 to 1891. He was director of the Opéra Garnier from 1 January 1892 until his death in 1899, first in association with Campocasso, and then from 1894, with Pedro Gailhard. At the Opéra he was the first to successfully produce operas by Richard Wagner and also mounted a new production Saint-Saëns' Samson et Dalila (1892) and gave the first performance of Massenet's Thaïs (1894).

== Bibliography ==
- Forman, Edward (2010). Historical Dictionary of French Theater. Lanham: The Scarecrow Press. ISBN 9780810849396.

Preceded by Eugène Ritt	director of the Paris Opera; 1892-1908; With: Pedro Gailhard (1892-1908)	Succeeded by André Messager with Leimistin Broussan
