= Carlo Vigarani =

Italian scenic designer

Carlo Vigarani (c. 1623 – 17 February 1713) was an Italian scenic designer who worked as ingénieur du roi ("royal engineer") and then intendant des plaisirs du roi ("intendant to the King's pleasures") at the court of the French king Louis XIV until 1690. He was born in Reggio di Lombardia and went to Paris with his father Gaspare Vigarani in 1659. He is best known for his design with his father and his brother Lodovico of the Salle des Machines at the Tuileries Palace in Paris. He returned to Paris in 1662, was naturalized French in 1673, and died in Saint-Ouen-les-Vignes.

== Bibliography ==
- Baricchi, Walter, editor; La Gorce, Jérôme de, editor (2009). Gaspare & Carlo Vigarani: Dalla corte degli Este a quella di Luigi XIV, papers from a 2005 symposium held in Reggio Emilia, Modena, Sassuolo, and Versailles, in Italian, French, or English. Milan: Silvana Editoriale. ISBN 9788836612789.
- La Gorce, Jérôme de (2005). Carlo Vigarani, intendant des plaisirs de Louis XIV. Paris: Perrin. ISBN 9782262023348.
- Sheren, Paul; La Gorce, Jérôme de (2001). "Vigarani, Carlo" in The New Grove Dictionary of Music and Musicians, second edition, edited by Stanley Sadie. London: Macmillan. ISBN 9781561592395 (hardcover). OCLC 419285866 (eBook).
- Tollini, Frederick Paul (2003). Scene Design at the Court of Louis XIV: The Work of the Vigarani Family and Jean Berain. Lewiston: Edwin Mellen Press. ISBN 9780773466753.
