= A. Duval =

French artist and engraver active 1769-1801

A. Duval was an artist and engraver active in France from 1769 to 1801.

== Works ==
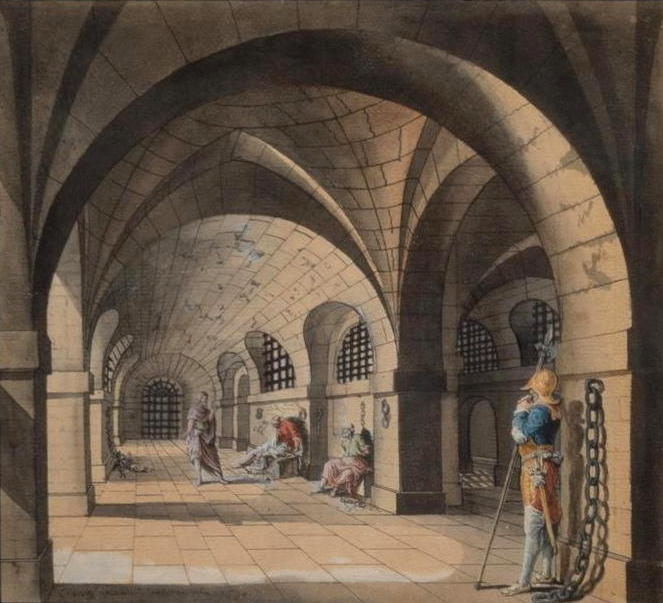
A dungeon, watercolor, 1769.

Duval's earliest known work is a highly detailed watercolor of a dungeon, signed and dated 1769. A later watercolor of a dungeon is signed and dated 1773. A drawing of a "design for the top and side of an oval, enamelled, gold, neo-classical snuffbox," at the Victoria and Albert Museum in London, bears an identical signature and the date 1770.

Engravings of Duval's depictions of French furniture were published by Jean-François Daumont in Paris, c.1770.

His engravings of architectural studies by Juste-Nathan François Boucher (also called Boucher fils), published by Jacques-François Chéreau around 1775, include a stylized and dated signature "ADUVAL fecit 1774" with conjoined letters A and D.

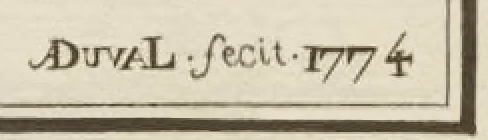
Detail, engraving of 1774.

Four architectural studies of tombs drawn and engraved by the artist (inscribed "Duval inv. sculp. 1775") are cited by Jessen.

Later works include his engravings after illustrations by Antoine-Denis Chaudet, François Gérard, Jean-Guillaume Moitte, and Nicolas-Antoine Taunay for the first volume of the complete Oeuvres de Jean Racine published by Pierre Didot in Paris in 1801.

== In museums ==
A. Duval's engravings are conserved at the Metropolitan Museum in New York, the Museum of Fine Arts, Houston, the Rijksmuseum in Amsterdam, and in Paris at the Louvre and the Institut National d'Histoire de l'Art (INHA).

== Gallery ==
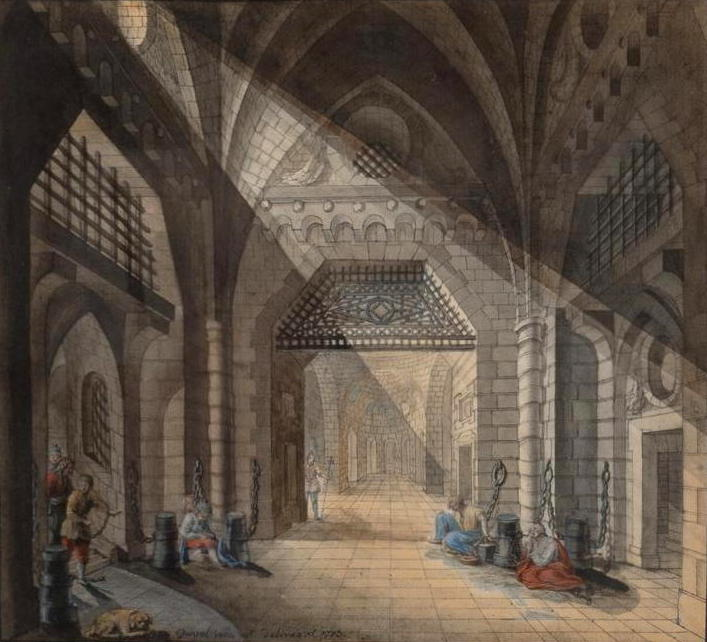
A dungeon, watercolor, 1773.

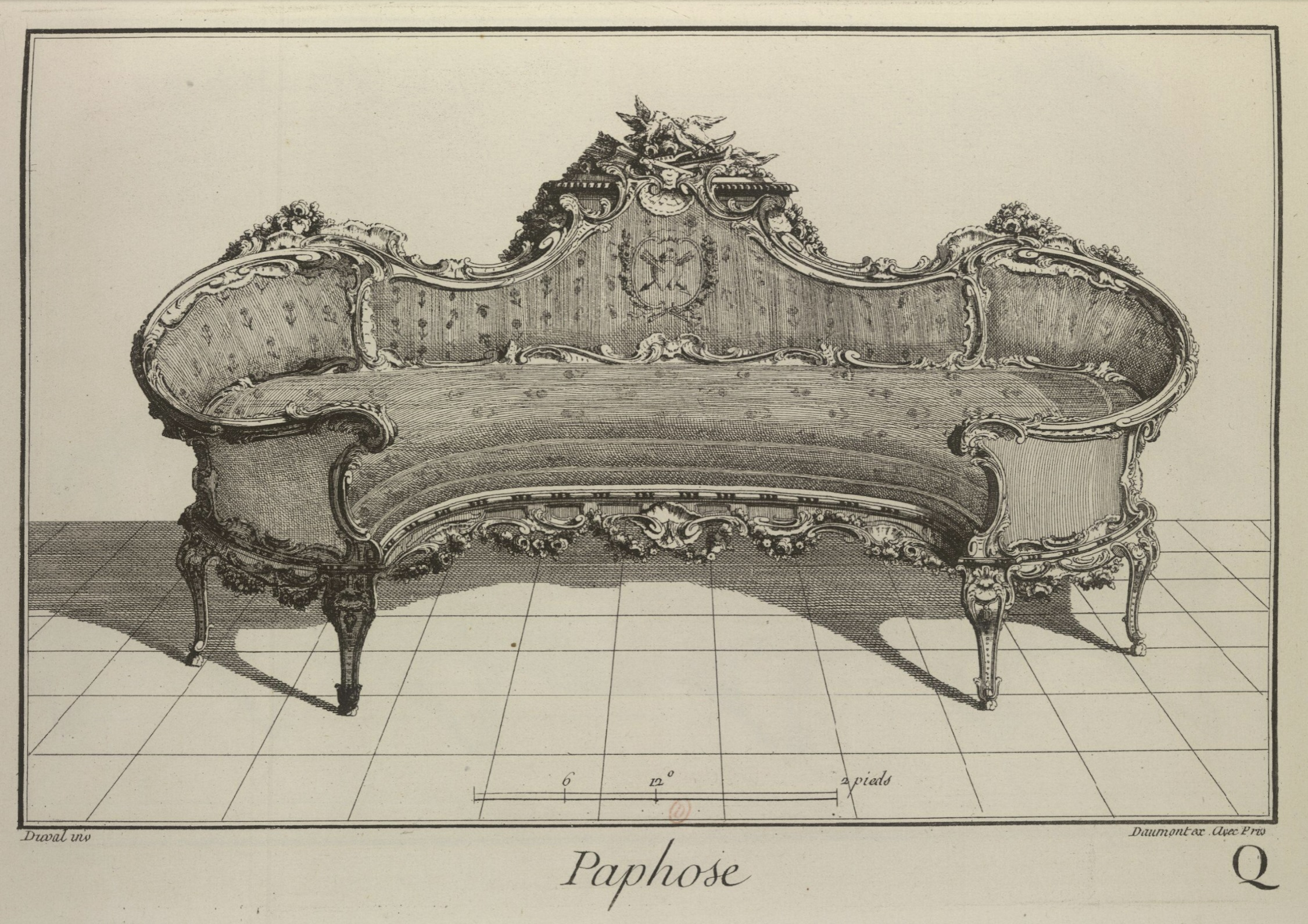
Paphose, c.1771.

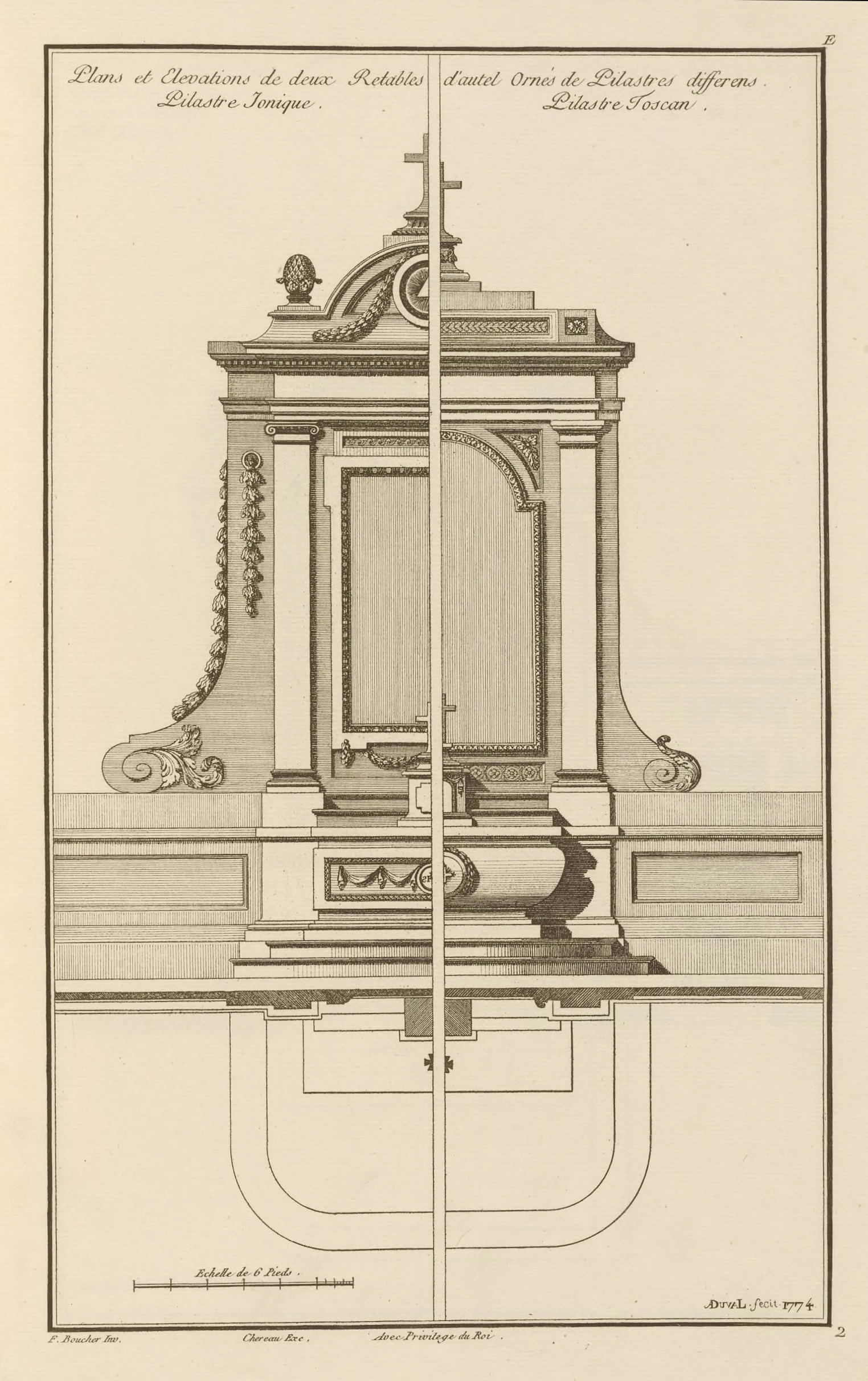
Elevations of two altarpieces, after Boucher fils, 1774.

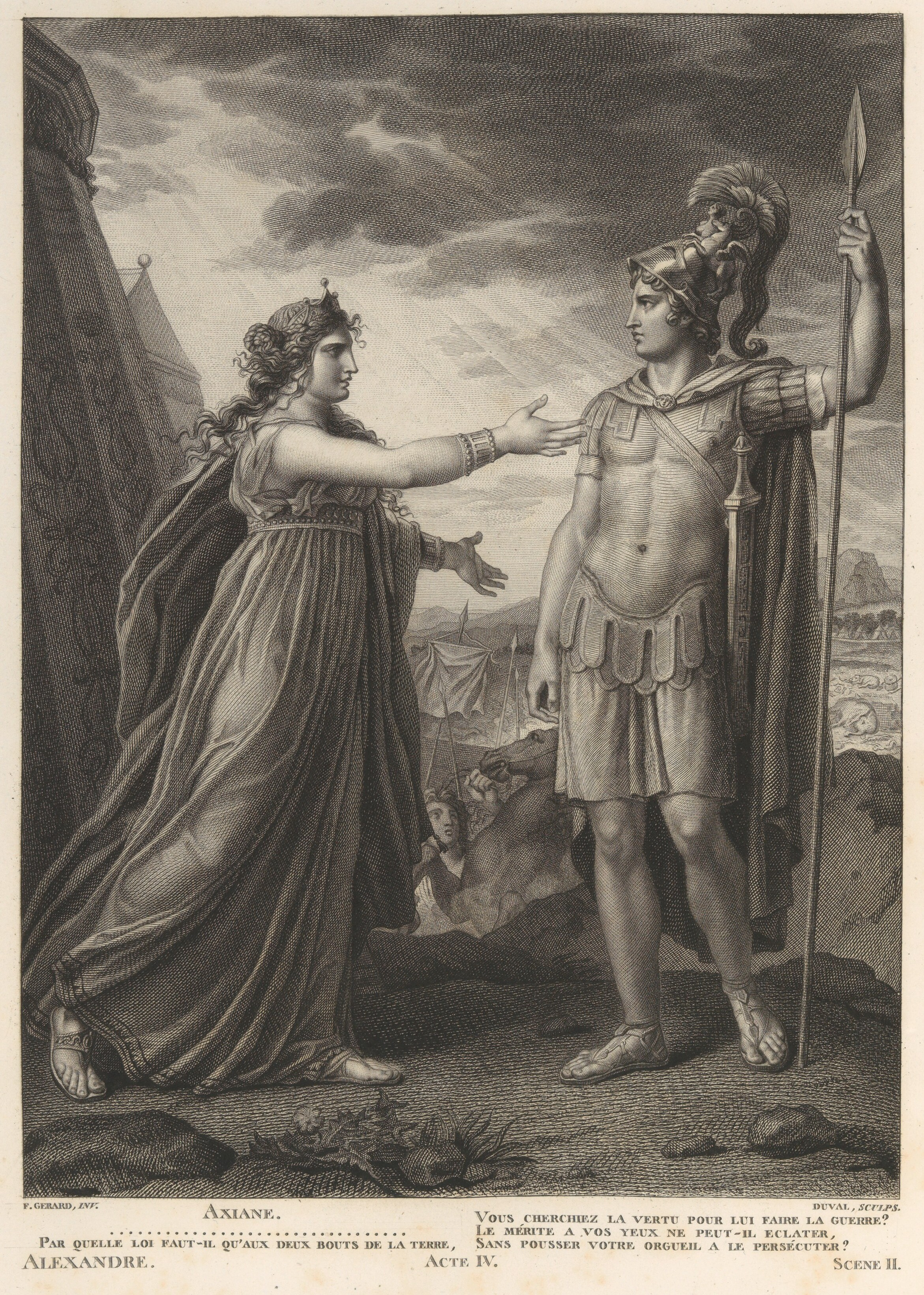
Alexandre le Grand by Racine, after Gérard, 1801.

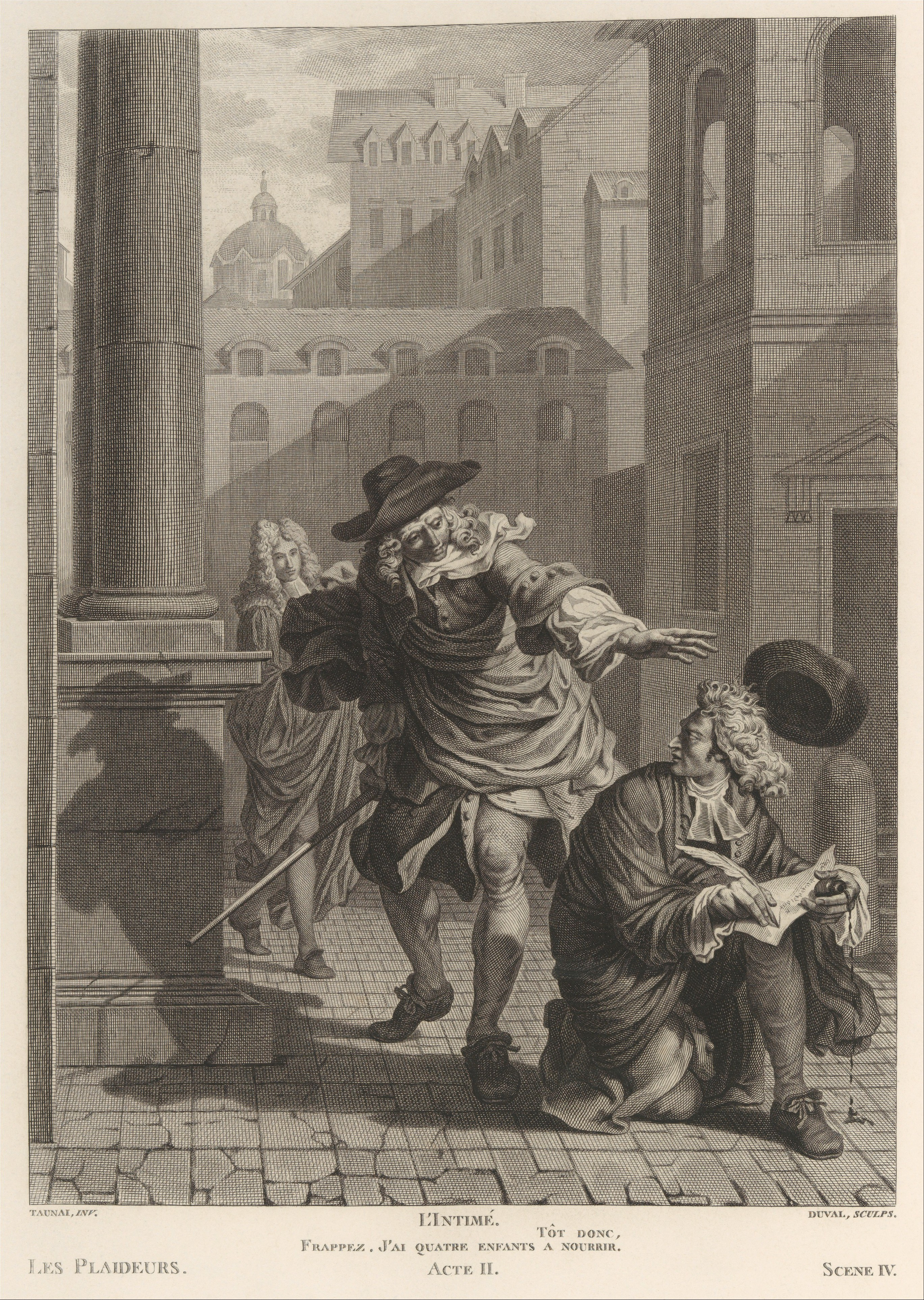
Les Plaideurs by Racine, after Taunay, 1801.

== Bibliography ==
- Boucher, Juste-Nathan François. Receuil des Décorations intérieures par Juste-François Boucher fils; soixante planches reproduites en facsimilé d'après l'édition de Chereau (vers 1775), Paris: Librairie Centrale des Beaux-Arts, 1904.
- Delafosse, Jean-Charles. Oeuvre de Jean-Charles Delafosse, vol. 3: Meubles, cahier Q, Paris: Jacques-François Chéreau, series published between 1760 et 1790.
- Guilemard, Désiré. Les maîtres ornemanistes: dessinateurs, peintres, architectes, sculpteurs et graveurs..., Paris: E. Plon, 1880.
- Jessen, Peter (1858–1926). Katalog der ornamentstich-sammlung des Kunstgewerbe-museums, mit 200 abbildungen, Leipzig: E.A. Seeman, 1894.
- Thieme, U., Vollmer, H., Willis, F. C., Becker, F. Allgemeines Lexikon der bildenden Künstler von der Antike bis zur Gegenwart: unter Mitwirkung von 300 fachgelehrten des In- und Auslandes, vol. 10, p. 238, Leipzig: E.A. Seemann, 1914.
