= La Thébaïde =

Play by Jean Racine

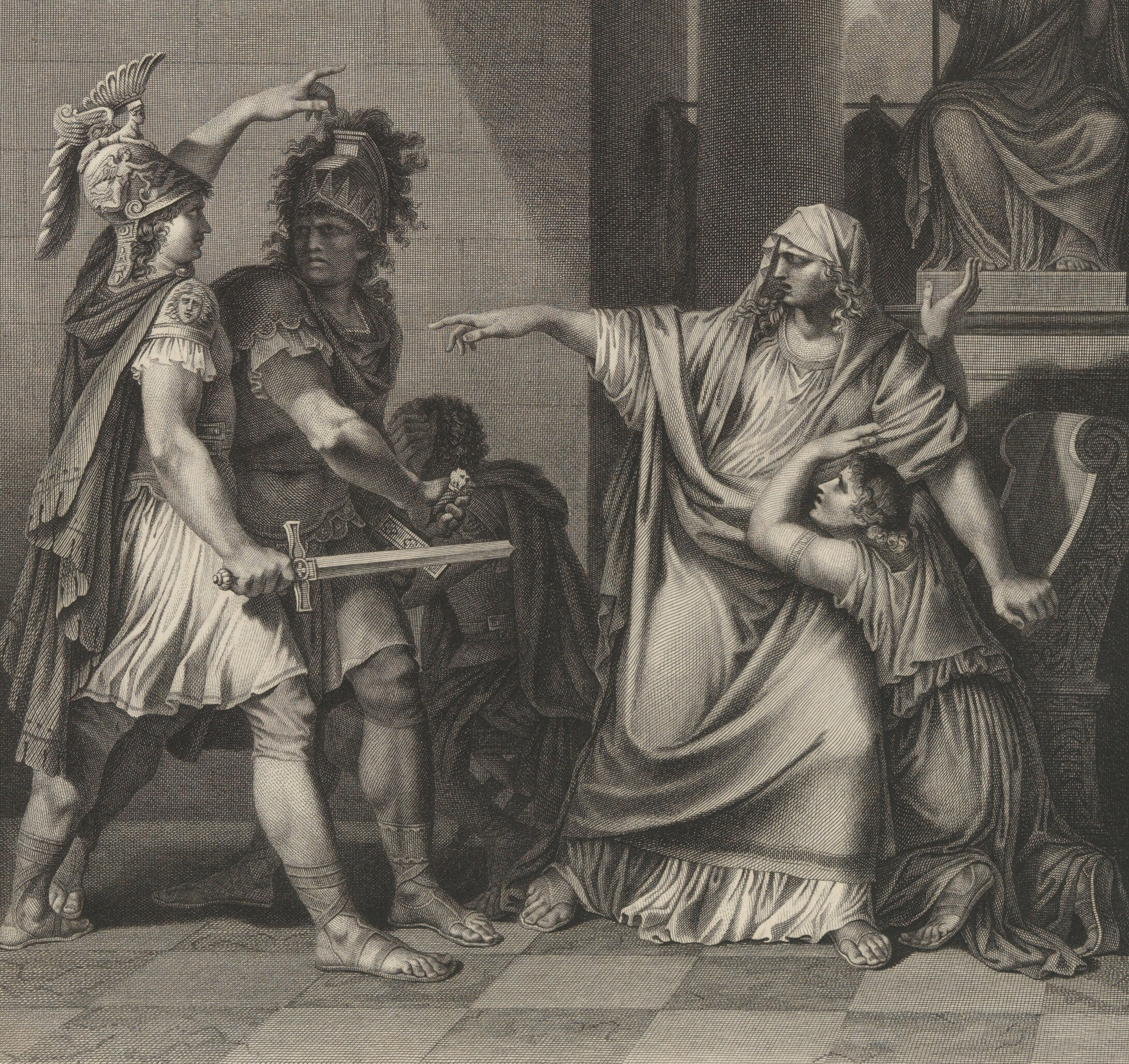
A scene from act four of La Thébaïde by French artist Jean-Guillaume Moitte, engraved by A. Duval, 1801.

La Thébaïde (The Thebaid, The Thebans or The Theban Brothers) is a tragedy in five acts (with respectively 6, 4, 6, 3 and 6 scenes) in verse by Jean Racine first presented, without much success, on June 20, 1664, at the Palais-Royal in Paris. The twins, along with their sister Antigone, were children borne of the incestuous marriage of the Theban king Oedipus and his mother Jocasta. The play depicts the struggle and death of the young son of Oedipus, as well as that of Antigone. This subject had already occupied many authors before Racine. Thus, the young playwright, still fairly inexperienced, drew particularly from the Antigone of Sophocles, the Phoenician Women of Euripides, but especially the Antigone of Jean Rotrou and the tragedies of Pierre Corneille.

This ancient Theban drama attracted great interest among 17th century French writers. The young Racine drew principally upon sources from Sophocles and Euripides, as well as the Antigone of Rotrou, and the Oedipus of Pierre Corneille. Molière may also have assisted in the play's composition.

== Plot ==
The plot is the same as the rest of the Theban plays and poems, in which Eteocles and Polynices, the two warring brothers, fight fiercely, despite the entreaties of their mother, Jocasta and Antigone, their sister, and their two cousins, Menoeceus and Haemon son of Creon. All these characters without exception are killed. Some kill themselves or die of grief. Their characters are quite weakly drawn, Eteocles and Polynices are monotonously violent, Jocasta tired by their declamations, and Creon is a cynical traitor.

== Analysis ==
Traditional scholarship saw limited merit in the play, deeming it an only partially successful work of a still maturing dramatist. In his groundbreaking work On Racine, however, Roland Barthes treats the play as seriously as Racine's greatest Greek dramas, including Phèdre and Iphigénie). Since Barthes, recent scholarship has shown greater interest, exploring, for example, power relationships driving the action, and, more broadly, fundamental problems of political philosophy that arise with respect to the legitimacy of the modern state.
