= Jean Racine =

17th-century French dramatist (1639–1699)

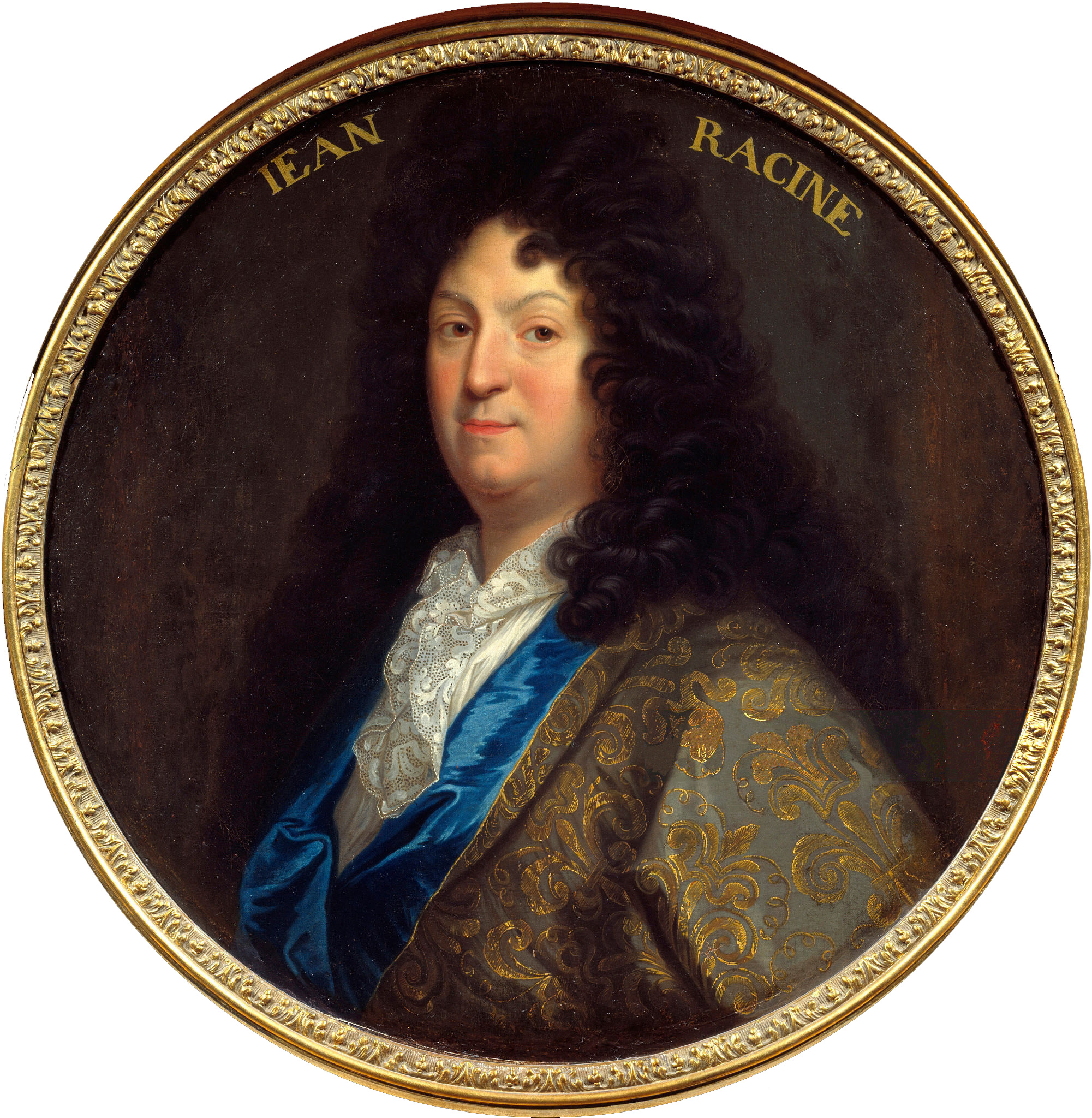
- Portrait by Jean-Baptiste Santerre
- Born: Jean-Baptiste Racine; 21 December 1639; La Ferté-Milon, Picardy, France
- Died: 21 April 1699 (aged 59); Paris, France
- Occupation: Dramatist
- Writing career
- Period: Seventeenth century
- Genres: Tragedy (primarily), comedy
- Notable works: Andromaque, Phèdre, Athalie
- Movements: Classicalism, Jansenism

Jean-Baptiste Racine (/ræˈsiːn/ rass-EEN, US also /rəˈsiːn/ rə-SEEN; French: [ʒɑ̃ batist ʁasin]; 22 December 1639 – 21 April 1699) was a French dramatist, one of the three great playwrights of 17th-century France, along with Molière and Corneille, as well as an important literary figure in the Western tradition and world literature. Racine was primarily a tragedian, producing such "examples of neoclassical perfection" as Phèdre, Andromaque, and Athalie. He did write one comedy, Les Plaideurs, and a muted tragedy, Esther, for the young.

Racine's plays displayed his mastery of the dodecasyllabic (12 syllable) French alexandrine. His writing is renowned for its elegance, purity, speed, and fury, and for what American poet Robert Lowell described as a "diamond-edge", and the "glory of its hard, electric rage". Racine's dramaturgy is marked by his psychological insight, the prevailing passion of his characters, and the nakedness of both plot and stage.

== Biography ==
Racine was born on 21 December 1639 in La Ferté-Milon (Aisne), in the province of Picardy in northern France. Orphaned by the age of four (his mother died in 1641 and his father in 1643), he came into the care of his grandparents. At the death of his grandfather in 1649, his grandmother, Marie des Moulins, went to live in the convent of Port-Royal and took her grandson with her. He received a classical education at the Petites écoles de Port-Royal, a religious institution which would greatly influence other contemporary figures including Blaise Pascal. Port-Royal was run by followers of Jansenism, a theology condemned as heretical by the French bishops and the Pope. Racine's interactions with the Jansenists in his years at this academy would have great influence over him for the rest of his life. At Port-Royal, he excelled in his studies of the classics and the themes of Greek and Roman mythology would play large roles in his future works.

He was expected to study law at the Collège d'Harcourt in Paris, but instead found himself drawn to a more artistic lifestyle. Experimenting with poetry drew high praise from France's greatest literary critic, Nicolas Boileau, with whom Racine would later become great friends; Boileau would often claim that he was behind the budding poet's work. Racine eventually took up residence in Paris where he became involved in theatrical circles.

His first play, Amasie, never reached the stage. On 20 June 1664 Racine's tragedy La Thébaïde ou les frères ennemis (The Thebans or the enemy Brothers) was produced by Molière's troupe at the Théâtre du Palais-Royal, in Paris. The following year, Molière also put on Racine's second play, Alexandre le Grand. However, this play garnered such good feedback from the public that Racine secretly negotiated with a rival play company, the Hôtel de Bourgogne, to perform the play – since they had a better reputation for performing tragedies. Thus, Alexandre premiered for the second time, by a different acting troupe, eleven days after its first showing. Molière could never forgive Racine for this betrayal, and Racine simply widened the rift between him and his former friend by seducing Molière's leading actress, Thérèse du Parc, into becoming his companion both professionally and personally. From this point on the Hôtel de Bourgogne troupe performed all of Racine's secular plays.

Though both La Thébaïde (1664) and its successor, Alexandre (1665), had classical themes, Racine was already entering into controversy and forced to field accusations that he was polluting the minds of his audiences. He broke all ties with Port-Royal, and proceeded with Andromaque (1667), which told the story of Andromache, widow of Hector, and her fate following the Trojan War. Amongst his rivals were Pierre Corneille and his brother, Thomas Corneille. Tragedians often competed with alternative versions of the same plot: for example, Michel le Clerc produced an Iphigénie in the same year as Racine (1674), and Jacques Pradon also wrote a play about Phèdre (1677). The success of Pradon's work (the result of the activities of a claque) was one of the events which caused Racine to renounce his work as a dramatist at that time, even though his career up to this point was so successful that he was the first French author to live almost entirely on the money he earned from his writings. Others, including the historian Warren Lewis, attribute his retirement from the theater to qualms of conscience.

However one major incident that seems to have contributed to Racine's departure from public life was his implication in a court scandal of 1679. He got married at about this time to the pious Catherine de Romanet, and his religious beliefs and devotion to the Jansenist sect were revived. He and his wife eventually had two sons and five daughters. Around the time of his marriage and departure from the theatre, Racine accepted a position as a royal historiographer in the court of King Louis XIV, alongside his friend Boileau. He kept this position in spite of the minor scandals he was involved in. In 1672 he was elected to the Académie française, eventually gaining much power over this organisation. Two years later he was given the title of "treasurer of France" and he was later distinguished as an "ordinary gentleman of the king" (1690) and then as a secretary of the king (1696). Because of Racine's flourishing career in the court, Louis XIV provided for his widow and children after his death. When at last he returned to the theatre it was at the request of Madame de Maintenon, morganatic second wife of King Louis XIV, with the moral fables, Esther (1689) and Athalie (1691), both of which were based on Old Testament stories and intended for performance by the pupils of the school of the Maison royale de Saint-Louis in Saint-Cyr (a commune neighboring Versailles and now known as Saint-Cyr l'École).

Jean Racine died in 1699 from cancer of the liver. He requested burial in Port-Royal, but after Louis XIV had this site razed in 1710 his remains were moved to the Saint-Étienne-du-Mont church in Paris.

== Style ==
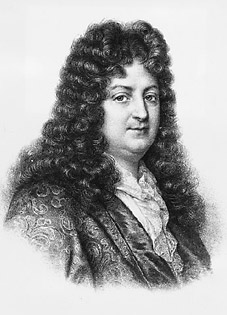
Jean Racine

The quality of Racine's poetry is perhaps his greatest contribution to French literature. His use of the alexandrine poetic line is considered exceptionally skilful.

Racine's work faced many criticisms from his contemporaries. One was the lack of historic veracity in plays such as Britannicus (1669) and Mithridate (1673). Racine was quick to point out that his greatest critics – his rival dramatists – were among the biggest offenders in this respect. Another major criticism levelled at him was the lack of incident in his tragedy Bérénice (1670). Racine's response was that the greatest tragedy does not necessarily consist in bloodshed and death.

=== General characteristics ===
Racine restricts his vocabulary to 2500 words. He rules out all workaday expressions since, although the Greeks could call a spade a spade, he does not believe that this is possible in Latin or French. The classical unities are strictly observed, for only the final stage of a prolonged crisis is described. The number of characters, all of them royal, is kept down to the barest minimum. Action on stage is all but eliminated. The mangled Hippolyte is not brought back, as is the Hippolytus of Euripides. The one exception to this is that Atalide stabs herself before the audience in Bajazet; but this is acceptable in a play conspicuous for its savagery and Oriental colour.

=== Fundamental nature of tragedy ===
Tragedy shows how men fall from prosperity to disaster. The higher the position from which the hero falls, the greater is the tragedy. Except for the confidants, of whom Narcisse (in Britannicus) and Œnone (in Phèdre) are the most significant, Racine describes the fate of kings, queens, princes and princesses, liberated from the constricting pressures of everyday life and able to speak and act without inhibition.

==== Nature of Greek tragedy ====
Greek tragedy, from which Racine borrowed so plentifully, tended to assume that humanity was under the control of gods indifferent to its sufferings and aspirations. In the Œdipus Tyrannus Sophocles's hero becomes gradually aware of the terrible fact that, however hard his family has tried to avert the oracular prophecy, he has nevertheless killed his father and married his mother and must now pay the penalty for these unwitting crimes. The same awareness of a cruel fate that leads innocent men and women into sin and demands retribution of the equally innocent children, pervades La Thébaïde, a play that itself deals with the legend of Œdipus.

==== Racine’s tragic vision ====
Racine is often said to have been deeply influenced by the Jansenist sense of fatalism. However, the link between Racine's tragedy and Jansenism has been disputed on multiple grounds; for example, Racine himself denied any connection to Jansenism. As a Christian, Racine could no longer assume, as did Æschylus and Sophocles, that God is merciless in leading men to a doom which they do not foresee. Instead, destiny becomes (at least, in the secular plays) the uncontrollable frenzy of unrequited love.

As already in the works of Euripides, the gods have become more symbolic. Venus represents the unquenchable force of sexual passion within the human being in Euripides' Hippolytus; but closely allied to this – indeed, indistinguishable from it – is the atavistic strain of monstrous aberration that had caused her mother Pasiphaë to mate with a bull and give birth to the Minotaur.

Thus, in Racine the hamartia, which the thirteenth chapter of Aristotle’s Poetics had declared a characteristic of tragedy, is not merely an action performed in all good faith which subsequently has the direst consequences (Œdipus's killing a stranger on the road to Thebes, and marrying the widowed Queen of Thebes after solving the Sphinx's riddle), nor is it simply an error of judgment (as when Deianira, in the Hercules Furens of Seneca the Younger, kills her husband when intending to win back his love); it is a flaw of character.

==== Racine’s concept of love ====
In a second important respect, Racine is at variance with the Greek pattern of tragedy. His tragic characters are aware of, but can do nothing to overcome, the blemish which leads them on to a catastrophe. And the tragic recognition, or anagnorisis, of wrongdoing is not confined, as in the Œdipus Tyrannus, to the end of the play, when the fulfilment of the prophecy is borne in upon Œdipus; Phèdre realizes from the very beginning the monstrousness of her passion, and preserves throughout the play a lucidity of mind that enables her to analyse and reflect upon this fatal and hereditary weakness. Hermione's situation is rather closer to that of Greek tragedy. Her love for Pyrrhus is perfectly natural and is not in itself a flaw of character. But despite her extraordinary lucidity (II 1; V 1) in analysing her violently fluctuating states of mind, she is blind to the fact that the King does not really love her (III 3), and this weakness on her part, which leads directly to the tragic peripeteia of III 7, is the hamartia from which the tragic outcome arises.

For Racine, love closely resembles a physiological disorder. It is a fatal illness with alternating moods of calm and crisis, and with deceptive hopes of recovery or fulfilment (Andromaque, ll. 1441–1448; Phèdre, ll. 767-768), the final remission culminating in a quick death. His main characters are monsters, and stand out in glaring contrast to the regularity of the plays' structure and versification. The suffering lover Hermione, Roxane or Phèdre is aware of nothing except her suffering and the means whereby it can be relieved. Her love is not founded upon esteem of the beloved and a concern for his happiness and welfare, but is essentially selfish. In a torment of jealousy, she tries to relieve the "pangs of despised love" by having (or, in Phèdre's case, allowing) him to be put to death, and thus associating him with her own suffering. The depth of tragedy is reached when Hermione realizes that Pyrrhus's love for Andromaque continues beyond the grave, or when Phèdre contrasts the young lovers' purity with her unnaturalness which should be hidden from the light of day. Racine's most distinctive contribution to literature is his conception of the ambivalence of love: "ne puis-je savoir si j'aime, ou si je hais?"

The passion of these lovers is totally destructive of their dignity as human beings, and usually kills them or deprives them of their reason. Except for Titus and Bérénice, they are blinded by it to all sense of duty. Pyrrhus casts off his fiancée in order to marry a slave from an enemy country, for whom he is prepared to repudiate his alliances with the Greeks. Orestes' duties as an ambassador are subordinate to his aspirations as a lover, and he finally murders the king to whom he has been sent. Néron's passion for Junie causes him to poison Britannicus and thus, after two years of virtuous government, to inaugurate a tyranny.

The characteristic Racinian framework is that of the eternal triangle: two young lovers, a prince and a princess, being thwarted in their love by a third person, usually a queen whose love for the young prince is unreciprocated. Phèdre destroys the possibility of a marriage between Hippolyte and Aricie. Bajazet and Atalide are prevented from marrying by the jealousy of Roxane. Néron divides Britannicus from Junie. In Bérénice the amorous couple are kept apart by considerations of state. In Andromaque the system of unrequited passions borrowed from tragicomedy alters the dramatic scheme, and Hermione destroys a man who has been her fiancé, but who has remained indifferent to her, and is now marrying a woman who does not love him. The young princes and princesses are agreeable, display varying degrees of innocence and optimism and are the victims of evil machinations and the love/hatred characteristic of Racine.

=== The major roles in Racinian tragedy ===
The king (Pyrrhus, Néron, Titus, Mithridate, Agamemnon, Thésée) holds the power of life and death over the other characters. Pyrrhus forces Andromaque to choose between marrying him and seeing her son killed. After keeping his fiancée waiting in Epirus for a year, he announces his intention of marrying her, only to change his mind almost immediately afterwards. Mithridate discovers Pharnace's love for Monime by spreading a false rumour of his own death. By pretending to renounce his fiancée, he finds that she had formerly loved his other son Xipharès. Wrongly informed that Xipharès has been killed fighting Pharnace and the Romans, he orders Monime to take poison. Dying, he unites the two lovers. Thésée is a rather nebulous character, primarily important in his influence upon the mechanism of the plot. Phèdre declares her love to Hippolyte on hearing the false news of his death. His unexpected return throws her into confusion and lends substance to Œnone's allegations. In his all-too-human blindness, he condemns to death his own son on a charge of which he is innocent. Only Amurat does not actually appear on stage, and yet his presence is constantly felt. His intervention by means of the letter condemning Bajazet to death (IV 3) precipitates the catastrophe.

The queen shows greater variations from play to play than anyone else, and is always the most carefully delineated character. Hermione (for she, rather than the pathetic and emotionally stable Andromaque, has a rôle equivalent to that generally played by the queen) is young, with all the freshness of a first and only love; she is ruthless in using Oreste as her instrument of vengeance; and she is so cruel in her brief moment of triumph that she refuses to intercede for Astyanax's life. Agrippine, an ageing and forlorn woman, "fille, femme, sœur et mère de vos maîtres", who has stopped at nothing in order to put her own son on the throne, vainly tries to reassert her influence over Néron by espousing the cause of a prince whom she had excluded from the succession. Roxane, the fiercest and bravest in Racine's gallery of queens, has no compunction in ordering Bajazet's death and indeed banishes him from her presence even before he has finished justifying himself. Clytemnestre is gentle and kind, but quite ineffectual in rescuing her daughter Iphigénie from the threat of sacrifice. Phèdre, passive and irresolute, allows herself to be led by Œnone; deeply conscious of the impurity of her love, she sees it as an atavistic trait and a punishment of the gods; and she is so consumed by jealousy that she can do nothing to save her beloved from the curse.

The confidants' primary function is to make monologues unnecessary. Only very rarely do they further the action. They invariably reflect the character of their masters and mistresses. Thus, Narcisse and Burrhus symbolize the warring elements of evil and good within the youthful Néron. But Narcisse is more than a reflection: he betrays and finally poisons his master Britannicus. Burrhus, on the other hand, is the conventional "good angel" of the medieval morality play. He is a much less colourful character than his opposite number. Œnone, Phèdre's evil genius, persuades her mistress to tell Hippolyte of her incestuous passion, and incriminates the young prince on Thésée's unexpected return. Céphise, knowing how deeply attached Pyrrhus is to her mistress, urges the despairing Andromaque to make a last appeal to him on her son's behalf, and so changes the course of the play.

=== Observance of the dramatic unities ===
Racine observes the dramatic unities more closely than the Greek tragedians had done. The philosopher Aristotle points out the ways in which tragedy differs from epic poetry:

"Tragedy generally tries to limit its action to a period of twenty-four hours, or not much exceeding that, whilst epic poetry is unlimited in point of time."

Writing centuries after the great Attic tragedians and using their works as a basis for generalization, he does not insist that the action of a tragedy must be confined to a single revolution of the sun, or that it must take place in one locality. He merely says that this limitation was often practised by writers of tragedy, but he well knew that there were many plays in which no such limitation existed. For instance, Æschylus's Agamemnon compresses into about fifteen minutes a journey (from Troy to Argos) which must have taken several days.

Nor was the unity of place a general feature of Attic tragedy. Æschylus's The Eumenides has two settings and in The Suppliants of Euripides, it is sometimes impossible to tell where the action is taking place at all. But the circumstances of the Greek theatre, which had no curtain and no distinctive scenery and in which the chorus almost always remained on stage throughout the play, were such that it was frequently desirable to confine the action to a single day and a single place.

The only rule which Aristotle lays down concerning the dramatic action is that, in common with all other forms of art, a tragedy must have an internal unity, so that every part of it is in an organic relationship to the whole and no part can be changed or left out without detracting from the economy of the play. No dramatic critic has ever dissented from this unity of action; but the unities of time and place were in fact read into the Poetics by theoreticians of the New Learning (Jean de La Taille) and other writers (Jean Vauquelin de la Fresnaye and Jean Mairet). The support which the unities received from Cardinal Richelieu eventually secured their complete triumph and Pierre Corneille, who had not conformed to them in his earlier plays, did so from the time of Le Cid (1636) onwards. But even he found them a tiresome imposition. Only by a very ready suspension of disbelief can we accept that in the space of twenty-four hours El Cid kills Chimène's father in a duel, overwhelms the Moorish invaders during the night and fights a second duel only a few hours after the enemy has fled. These discrepancies – and others besides, which Corneille admits to in his Examen of the play – are obvious even to the most inattentive spectator.

Unlike his rival, who crams into his plays "quantité d'incidents qui ne se pourraient passer qu'en un mois", Racine describes fluctuating states of mind which, in the rapidly mounting tension, are brought abruptly to a crisis from which there is no retreat. The so-called Aristotelian rules happen to suit this type of drama perfectly since they lead the playwright to concentrate the tragic action on those few hours when, after months or years of emotional tension, a new event supervenes and precipitates the catastrophe.

The most striking evidence of Racine's success in fitting his tragedies into this very stringent framework is that, when watching them, the audience ceases to be aware that the unities exist. Not long before he wrote Phèdre, the same subject had been dealt with by Gabriel Gilbert and Mathieu Bidar, both of whom had kept Hippolyte off stage after Act IV. Racine, on the other hand, brings him into Act V scene 1, the last line of which is only seventy or eighty lines earlier than Théramène's récit in V 6. In the four minutes which these lines take to recite the young prince has gone out with Théramène, has met, fought and been killed by the monster, and Théramène has come back to announce his master's death. Furthermore, Aricie only leaves the stage at the end of V 3, and therefore in the space of two short scenes has met her dying lover on the seashore and has taken her leave of him! These chronological inconsistencies pass unnoticed in the theatre.

Racine invariably observes the unity of place. A room in Pyrrhus's palace at Buthrotum; an antechamber separating the apartments of Titus and Bérénice in Rome; Agamemnon's camp at Aulis; an antechamber in the temple at Jerusalem: by choosing such vague and remote settings Racine gives his plays a universal character, and the presentation of conflicting and hesitating states of mind is not hampered by an undue insistence on material surroundings. At times, of course, the unity of place leads to slightly far-fetched meetings: why, for instance, does Pyrrhus come to see Oreste (Act I Sc. 2), rather than the other way around, except to conform to this rule? Lastly, the unity of place necessitates the récit and this again is in complete harmony with Racine's fundamental aims: how would Andromaque gain by our being able to see Pyrrhus and his bride approach and enter the temple? The important fact is the effect of Cléone's words upon Hermione. Oreste's relating to Hermione the murder of Pyrrhus is the supreme irony of the play. Théramène's récit describes, in the most memorable and poetic language, an event which would be infinitely less moving if it were to be seen it imperfectly represented upon the stage.

As regards the unity of action, Racine differs sharply from William Shakespeare in excluding minor plots (compare the parallel themes of blind and unnatural fatherhood and the retribution it invokes, in King Lear) and in ruling out the comic element. The fact that Act II scene 5 of Andromaque or many of the scenes of Alexandre le Grand and Mithridate have comic undertones is beside the point. Will Andromaque agree to marry Pyrrhus? Will Agamemnon sacrifice Iphigénie? Can Esther persuade her husband to spare the Jews? The plots of Bajazet, Phèdre and Athalie are scarcely more complex than the rest.

==== Tempo of Racinian tragedy ====
Unlike such plays as Hamlet and The Tempest, in which a dramatic first scene precedes the exposition, a Racinian tragedy opens very quietly, but even so in a mood of suspense. In Andromaque Pyrrhus's unenviable wavering between Hermione and the eponymous heroine has been going on for a year and has exasperated all three. Up to the time when Britannicus begins, Néron has been a good ruler, a faithful disciple of Seneca and Burrhus, and a dutiful son; but he is now beginning to show a spirit of independence. With the introduction of a new element (Oreste's demand that Astyanax should be handed over to the Greeks; Junie's abduction; Abner's unconscious disclosure that the time to proclaim Joas has finally come), an already tense situation becomes, or has become, critical. In a darkening atmosphere, a succession of fluctuating states of mind on the part of the main characters brings us to the resolution – generally in the fourth Act, but not always (Bajazet, Athalie) – of what by now is an unbearable discordance. Hermione entrusts the killing of Pyrrhus to Oreste; wavers for a moment when the King comes into her presence; then, condemns him with her own mouth. No sooner has Burrhus regained his old ascendancy over Néron, and reconciled him with his half-brother, than Narcisse most skilfully overcomes the emperor's scruples of conscience and sets him on a career of vice of which Britannicus's murder is merely the prelude. By the beginning of Act IV of Phèdre, Œnone has besmirched Hippolyte's character, and the Queen does nothing during that Act to exculpate him. With the working-out of a situation usually decided by the end of Act IV, the tragedies move to a swift conclusion.

=== Treatment of sources ===
In the religious plays, Racine is fairly scrupulous in adhering to his Old Testament sources, taking care to put into the mouth of Joad (the Second Jehoiada) only those prophetic utterances that are to be found in the Bible. Nevertheless, he takes advantage of a verse in II Chronicles XXIV attributing the gift of prophecy to Joad's son Zacharie (Zechariah ben Jehoiada) in order to suppose that the father (whom the Bible does not describe as a prophet) likewise had prophetic powers. And thinking a child of seven – the age of Joas (Jehoash of Judah) in the Second Book of Kings – too young to have the part given him in Athalie, Racine makes him into a boy of nine or ten on the evidence of the Septuagint version of II Chronicles XXIII 1.

In the secular plays, he takes far greater liberties. The frequently conflicting sources of Greek and Roman mythology enable him to fashion the plot he thinks suitable to his characters and, above all, to present the old stories in a modern light. Whereas Euripides, in his Iphigenia in Aulis, averts the heroine's death only by causing Artemis to spirit her away to Tauris, putting a hart in her place on the sacrificial altar. Racine, determined to avoid the miraculous, borrows from a minor Greek writer, the geographer Pausanias, the character of Ériphile. The disclosure that Iphigénie's treacherous rival was herself called Iphigeneia at birth and should be sacrificed in the heroine's place prevents a tragic outcome.

In creating Andromaque, Racine believes he must "[se] conformer à l'idée que nous avons maintenant de cette princesse". Astyanax, whom Euripides describes (in The Trojan Women and the Andromache) as having been thrown from the walls of Troy and killed, and whose death is foreshadowed in book 24 of the Iliad, is made to survive the capture of Troy and the extinction of his dynasty. In another respect also, Racine departs from the lines laid down by the Andromache, for whereas in the earlier play the heroine fears that the son she has had by Pyrrhus may suffer death if she refuses to marry the father, the later heroine fears for the life of a legitimate son. The reason for these changes in the Homeric and Euripidean traditions is obvious: if Andromaque had been Pyrrhus's mistress (as in Euripides), why should she refuse to marry him? Racine, like Homer, conceives her as sublimely faithful to Hector; yet the tension (III 8) between maternal love and a reluctance to marry Pyrrhus must (as in Euripides) be paramount. And so Astyanax is brought back to life.

Phèdre differs from Euripides's Hippolytus and Seneca the Younger's Phædra in the very important respect that, taking the character of Aricie from Virgil, Racine introduces the jealousy motive. Despite the fact that Hippolyte, "ce fils chaste et respectueux", is indifferent to her, Phèdre will not consent to Œnone's suggesting to Thésée that the son has made improper advances to the stepmother – until (IV 5) she discovers that he has loved Aricie all along.

== Criticism ==
Racine's works have evoked in audiences and critics a wide range of responses, ranging from reverence to revulsion. In his book Racine: A Study (1974), Philip Butler of the University of Wisconsin broke the main criticisms of Racine down by century to show the almost constantly shifting perception of the playwright and his works.

=== 17th century ===
In his own time, Racine found himself compared constantly with his contemporaries, especially the great Pierre Corneille. In his own plays, Racine sought to abandon the ornate and almost otherworldly intricacy that Corneille so favored. Audiences and critics were divided over the worth of Racine as an up-and-coming playwright. Audiences admired his return to simplicity and their ability to relate to his more human characters, while critics insisted on judging him according to the traditional standards of Aristotle and his Italian commentators from which he tended to stray. Attitudes shifted, however, as Racine began to eclipse Corneille. In 1674, the highly respected poet and critic Boileau published his Art Poétique which deemed Racine's model of tragedy superior to that of Corneille. This erased all doubts as to Racine's abilities as a dramatist and established him as one of the period's great literary minds.

Butler describes this period as Racine's "apotheosis," his highest point of admiration. Racine's ascent to literary fame coincided with other prodigious cultural and political events in French history. This period saw the rise of literary giants like Molière, Jean de La Fontaine, Boileau, and François de La Rochefoucauld, as well as Louis Le Vau's historic expansion of the Palace of Versailles, Jean-Baptiste Lully's revolution in Baroque music, and most importantly, the ascension of Louis XIV to the throne of France.

During Louis XIV's reign, France rose up from a long period of civil discord (see the Fronde) to new heights of international prominence. Political achievement coincided with cultural and gave birth to an evolution of France's national identity, known as l'esprit français. This new self-perception acknowledged the superiority of all things French; the French believed France was home to the greatest king, the greatest armies, the greatest people, and, subsequently, the greatest culture. In this new national mindset, Racine and his work were practically deified, established as the perfect model of dramatic tragedy by which all other plays would be judged. Butler blames the consequential "withering" of French drama on Racine's idolized image, saying that such rigid adherence to one model eventually made all new French drama a stale imitation.

=== 19th century ===
The French installation of Racine into the dramatic and literary pantheon evoked harsh criticism from many sources who argued against his 'perfection.' Germans like Friedrich Schiller and Johann Wolfgang von Goethe dismissed Racine as höfisches Drama, or "courtly drama" too restricted by the étiquette and conventions of a royal court for the true expression of human passion. French critics, too, revolted. Racine came to be dismissed as merely "an historical document" that painted a picture only of 17th century French society and nothing else; there could be nothing new to say about him. However, as writers like Charles Baudelaire and Gustave Flaubert came onto the scene to soundly shake the foundations of French literature, conservative readers retreated to Racine for the nostalgia of his simplicity.

As Racine returned to prominence at home, his critics abroad remained hostile due mainly, Butler argues, to Francophobia. The British were especially damning, preferring Shakespeare and Sir Walter Scott to Racine, whom they dismissed as "didactic" and "commonplace." This did not trouble the French, however, as "Racine, La Fontaine, or generally speaking the chefs-d'œuvre de l'esprit humain could not be understood by foreigners."

=== 20th century ===
The 20th century saw a renewed effort to rescue Racine and his works from the chiefly historical perspective to which he had been consigned. Critics called attention to the fact that plays such as Phèdre could be interpreted as realist drama, containing characters that were universal and that could appear in any time period. Other critics cast new light upon the underlying themes of violence and scandal that seem to pervade the plays, creating a new angle from which they could be examined. In general, people agreed that Racine would only be fully understood when removed from the context of the 18th century. Jean-Yves Tadié noted that Marcel Proust developed a fondness for Racine at an early age, "whom he considered a brother and someone very much like himself..."

In his essay, The Theatre and Cruelty, Antonin Artaud claimed that 'the misdeeds of the psychological theater descended from Racine have made us unaccustomed to that immediate and violent action which the theater should possess' (p. 84).

=== 21st century ===
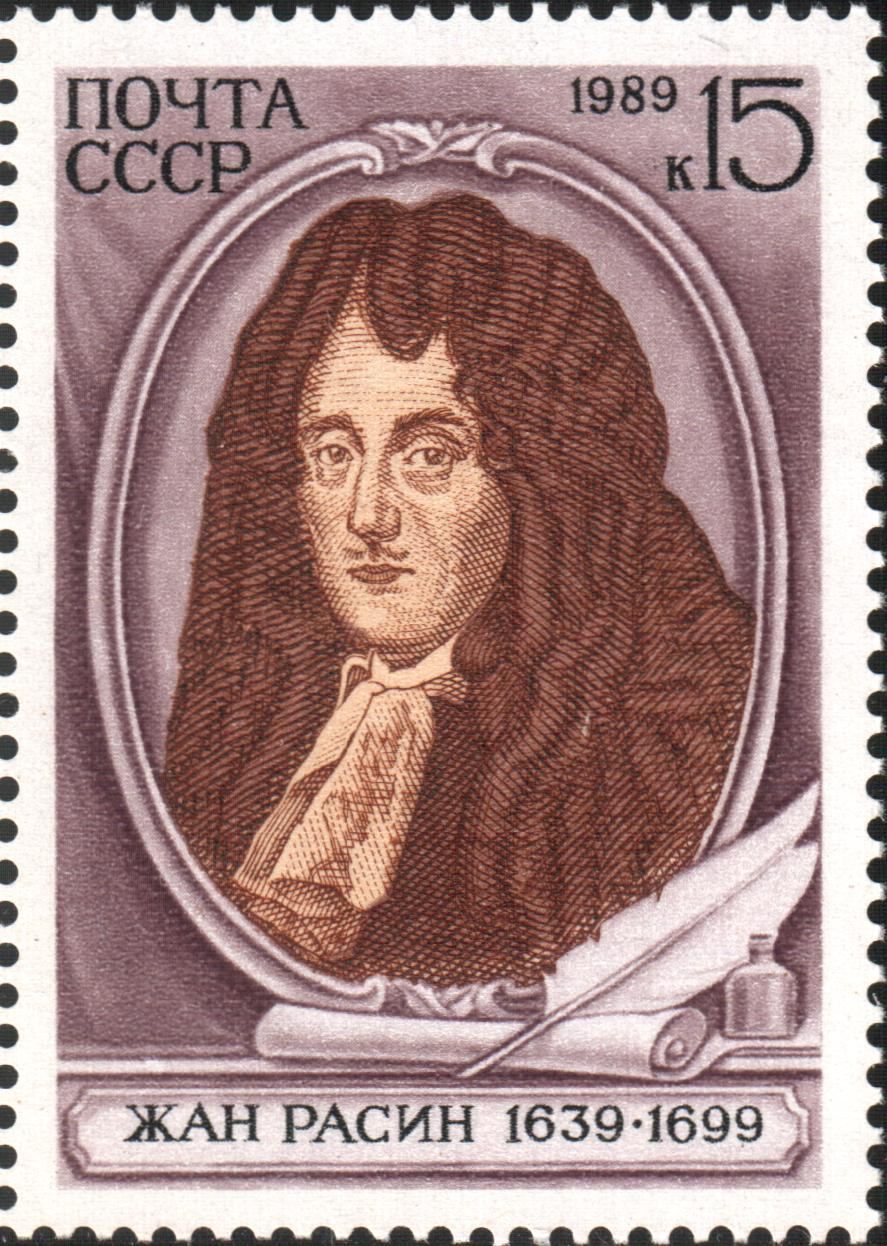
Jean Racine on the 1989 USSR commemorative stamp

At present, Racine is still widely considered a literary genius of revolutionary proportions. His work is still widely read and frequently performed. Racine's influence can be seen in A.S. Byatt's tetralogy (The Virgin in the Garden 1978, Still Life 1985, Babel Tower 1997 and A Whistling Woman 2002). Byatt tells the story of Frederica Potter, an English young woman in the early 1950s (when she is first introduced), who is very appreciative of Racine, and specifically of Phedre.

== Translations ==
The linguistic effects of Racine's poetry are widely considered to be untranslatable, although many eminent poets have attempted to translate Racine's work into English, including Lowell, Richard Wilbur, Ted Hughes, Tony Harrison, and Derek Mahon. Friedrich Schiller translated Racine into the German language, and Monsignor Pádraig de Brún into the Irish language.

Racine's plays have been translated into English by Robert David MacDonald, Alan Hollinghurst (Berenice, Bajazet), by RADA director Edward Kemp (Andromache), Neil Bartlett, and poet Geoffrey Alan Argent, who earned a 2011 American Book Award for the translating The Complete Plays of Jean Racine.

== Dramatic works ==
=== Tragedies ===
- La Thébaïde (1664)
- Alexandre le Grand (1665)
- Andromaque (1667)
- Britannicus (1669)
- Bérénice (1670)
- Bajazet (1672)
- Mithridate (1673)
- Iphigénie (1674)
- Phèdre (1677)
- Esther (1689)
- Athalie (1691)

=== Comedies ===
- Les Plaideurs (1668)

== Other works ==
=== Translations ===
- Le Banquet de Platon
- Vie de Diogène le Cynique
- Texts of Eusebius of Caesarea
- La Poétique (Aristotle)

=== Historical works ===
- Vie de Louis XIV (lost)
- Abrégé de l'histoire de Port-Royal (1767)
