= Esther (play) =

French play by Jean Racine

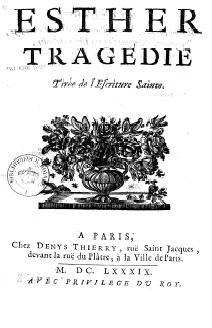
Title page from the 1689 edition of Esther

Esther is a play in three acts written in 1689 by the French dramatist, Jean Racine. It was premièred on January 26, 1689, performed by the pupils of the Maison royale de Saint-Louis, an educational institute for young girls of noble birth. The subject is taken from the biblical Book of Esther.

Esther remains one of Racine's lesser known works as it has only three instead of the classical five acts. It dates from the last period of his career when he entered government work and was requested by Madame de Maintenon to return to liturgical drama. It is often negatively compared to Racine's 1691 biblical play written for Maintenon, Athalie.

== Later reception ==
From the 1876 translation of Caroline Andrews:

In the reign of Louis XIV, a seminary for young ladies was founded at St. Cyr, at the persuasion of Madame Maintenon, who gave her entire attention to the education of 250 noble young ladies; who were educated free of expense until their 20th year. Racine was requested to compose a poem suitable for their instruction and amusement, and he proposed the subject of Esther; which he dramatized to the satisfaction of teachers and pupils, and which they declaimed and chanted with so much grace and modesty, that this little drama, intended only for the benefit of young pupils, became the admiration of king and court. Grand lords saw and applauded. As the translator has followed closely the original, she hopes to recommend the same to the attention of lady educators. And knowing that the Jews in the celebration of their Purim always read the book of Esther, it is thought the rehearsal of this drama might make a deeper impression on the minds of their youth and contribute to their entertainment.

Testimonial: The following testimonial from Rabbi Wise of Cincinnati, Ohio: "The English version of Esther by Mrs. Andrews is a masterpiece in my estimation, full of magnificent gems and faithful to the original."

== List of characters ==
- Ahasuerus, King of Persia
- Esther, Queen of Persia
- Mordecai, Uncle to Esther
- Haman, Favorite of Ahasuerus
- Zeresh, Wife of Haman
- Hydaspes, Officer in the King's Palace
- Asaph, another Officer of the King
- Elise, a Confidante of Esther
- Tamar, of the Suite of Esther
- Guards, of King Ahasuerus
- Chorus, of Israelite Maidens

== See also ==
- Ad usum Delphini
