= Alexandre le Grand =

Alexandre le Grand is a tragedy in 5 acts (of 3, 5, 7, 5 and 3 scenes, respectively) and verse by Jean Racine. It was first produced on 4 December 1665 at the Palais Royal Theater in Paris. The subject of the play is the love of Alexander the Great and the Indian princess Cleofile complicated by intrigues between her brother Taxilus and his ally Porus. The play is largely based on a surviving work by the Roman historian Quintus Curtius Rufus.

Shortly after the play's opening at the Théâtre Palais Royal, Racine moved it to the more prestigious company at the Hôtel de Bourgogne, where it opened on 18 December, creating a rift with Molière.
