= Les Plaideurs =

Les Plaideurs, 1669 (book in DjVu format)

Les Plaideurs, or The Litigants, written in 1668 and published in 1669, is a comedy in three acts with respectively eight, fourteen, and four scenes, in alexandrine verse by Jean Racine. It is the only comedy he wrote. It was inspired by The Wasps by Aristophanes, but Racine removed all political significance. His play, which he wrote after Andromaque and before Britannicus, was a farce that, surrounded in his work by tragedies, was unexpected.

Les Plaideurs was first performed late in 1668 at the Hôtel de Bourgogne in Paris.

== Roles ==
- Dandin ("ninny"), a judge. Dandin is senile and has been forced into retirement. His idée fixe is to keep holding trials, and he finally turns his own home into a court of justice where his servants and pet animals plead and are convicted.
- Leandre, his son. In love with Isabelle.
- Chicanneau, a bourgeois. He's obsessed with lawsuits.
- Isabelle, daughter of Chicanneau. In love with Léandre.
- La Comtesse ("The Countess"). She's obsessed with lawsuits.
- Petit Jean ("Little John"), porter. He works for the Dandin family.
- L'Intimé, secretary. He works for the Dandin family.
- Le Souffleur ("The Prompter"). Only appears during the mock-trial, to help the fake lawyers remember their lines.
