= Théâtre du Palais-Royal (rue Saint-Honoré) =

Parisian theatre

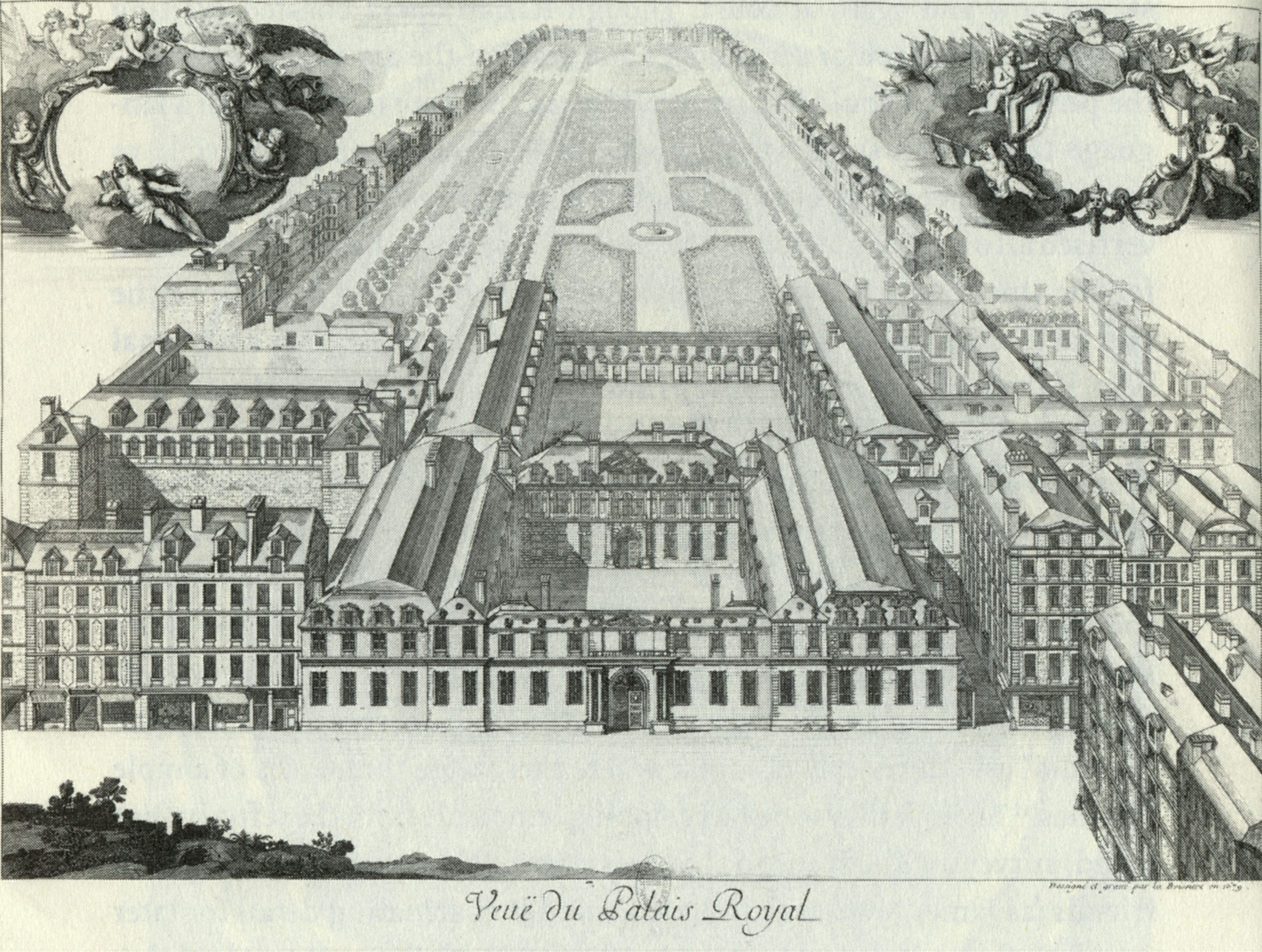
View of the Palais-Royal in 1679. The theatre was in the east wing (on the right).

The Théâtre du Palais-Royal (French pronunciation: [teɑtʁ dy palɛ ʁwajal]; or Grande Salle du Palais-Royal) on the rue Saint-Honoré in Paris was a theatre in the east wing of the Palais-Royal, which opened on 14 January 1641 with a performance of Jean Desmarets' tragicomedy Mirame. The theatre was used by the troupe of Molière from 1660 to 1673 and as an opera house by the Académie Royale de Musique from 1673 to 1763, when it was destroyed by fire. It was rebuilt and reopened in 1770, but again was destroyed by fire in 1781 and not rebuilt.

== First theatre ==
=== Cardinal Richelieu ===
The Palais-Royal was originally known as the Palais-Cardinal, since it was built in the 1630s as the principal residence of Cardinal Richelieu. The palace already had a small theatre, the Petite Salle des Comédies, located in the wing running north from the east end of the corps-de-logis. On a 1673 plan it is marked "Petite Salle des Ballets". In 1637 Richelieu asked his architect Jacques Le Mercier to begin work on a larger theatre, located east of the entrance courtyard to the south. The new theatre was built between 1639 and 1640 "at the staggering cost of 300,000 livres—of which 100,000 livres was allocated to stage machinery."

Architectural plans with the Grande Salle

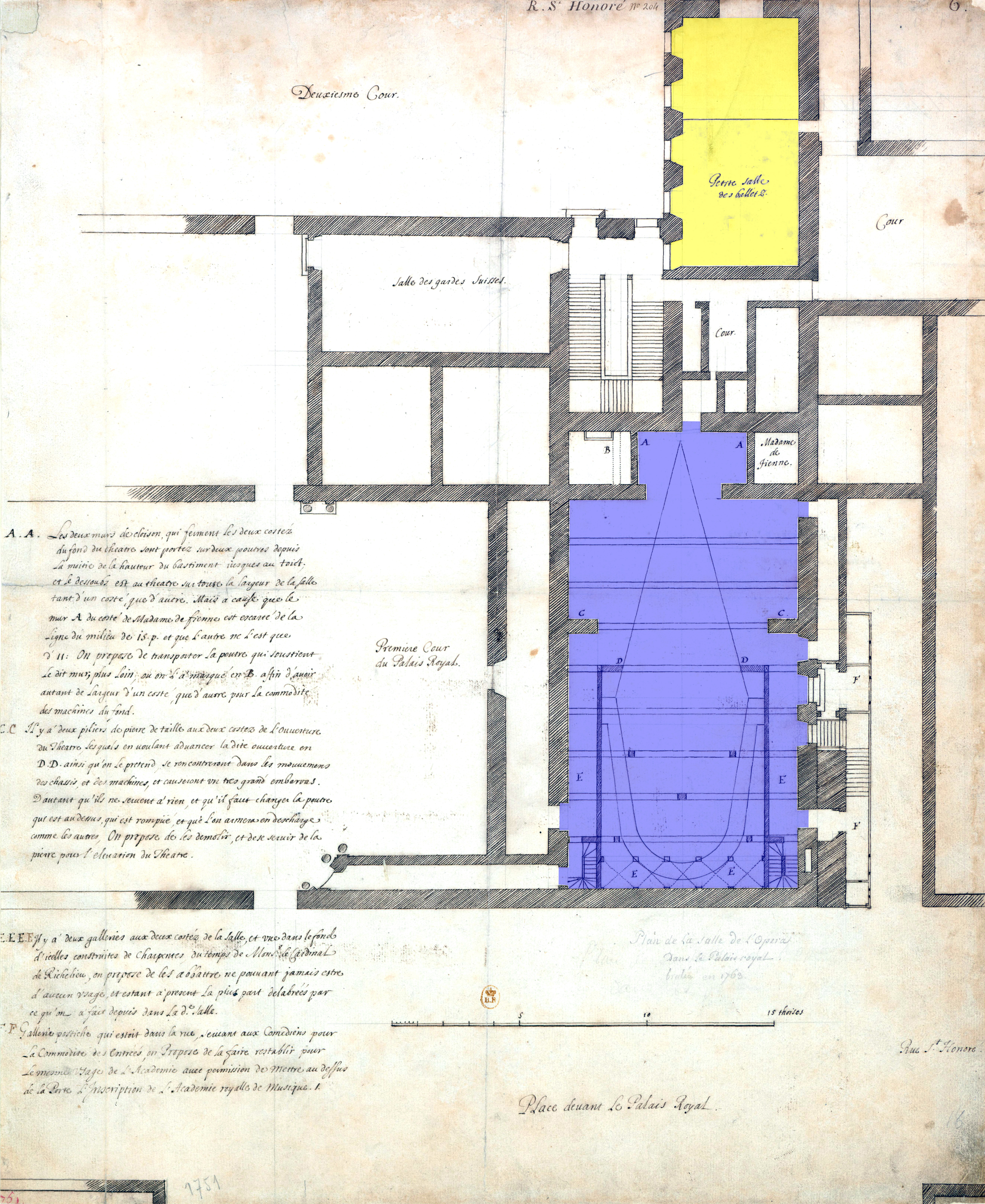
Detail plan of 1673 showing the Petite Salle in yellow and the Grande Salle in blue

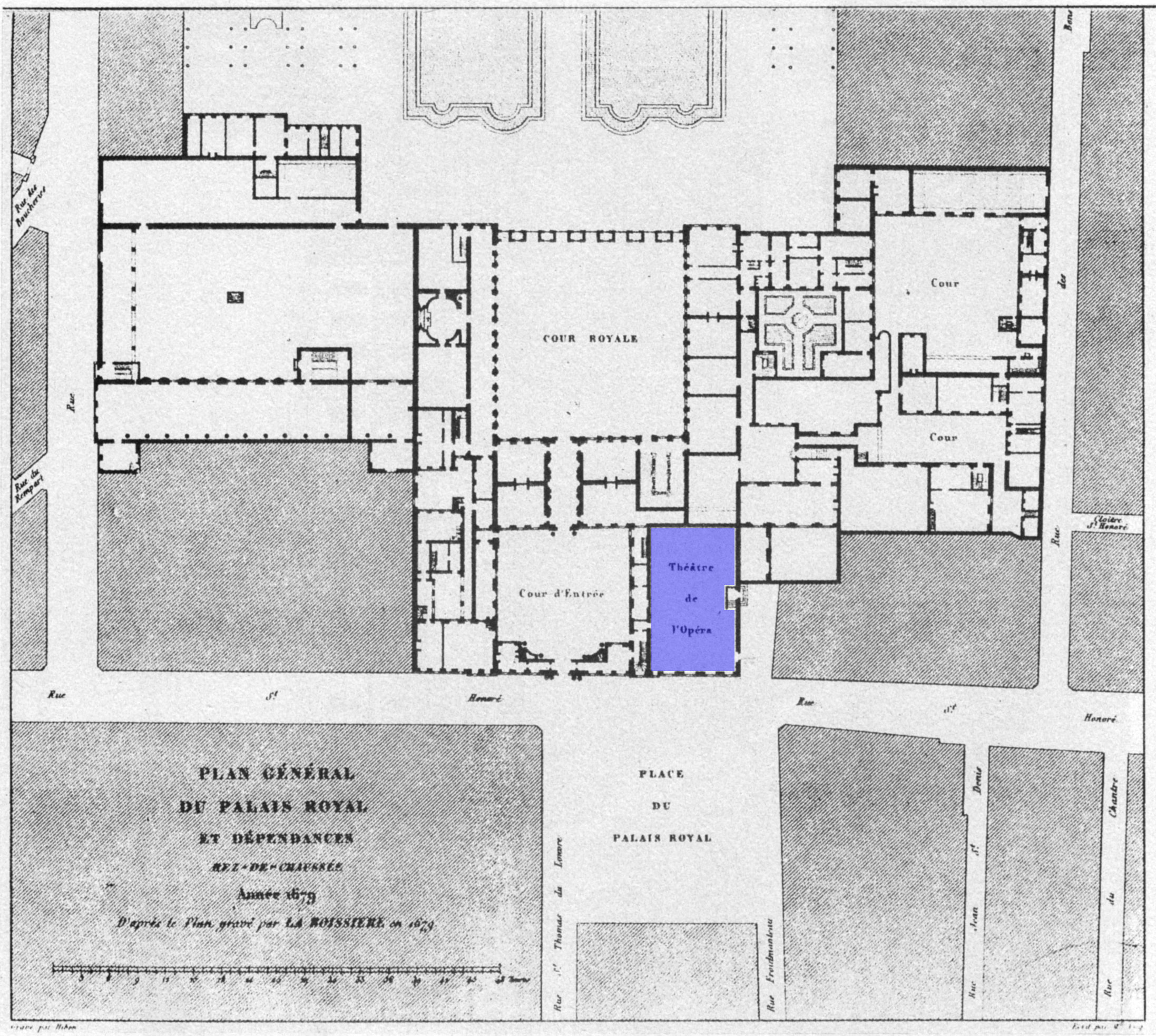
General ground-floor plan of 1679 with the Grande Salle in blue
(48.862894°N 2.337255°E)

The hall, initially known as the Grande Salle du Palais-Cardinal (Large Hall of the Palais-Cardinal), was one of the earliest theatres in France to use the proscenium arch, seen earlier in Italian theatres, with a solid stage curtain, raised and lowered by a roller behind the arch. It had two balconies, a capacity of about 3,000 spectators and a stage equipped with the latest in theatre machinery.

The theatre opened on 14 January 1641 with a performance of Jean Desmarets' tragicomedy Mirame. The play had a single perspective set, depicting the Palais Royal d'Heraclée (Royal Palace of Heracles), used for every scene, thus conforming to l'unité de lieu (unity of place), one of the Three Unities, which had come under discussion in France during the 1630s. Nevertheless, there were numerous mechanical effects. The Gazette de France of 19 January described the beauty of the Grande Salle and the "majestic ornaments of this superb stage upon which, with transport difficult to express and which was followed by a universal exclamation of astonishment, appeared delicious gardens with grottoes, statues, fountains, and great terraces above the sea." The report also describes elaborate lighting effects: "The sky was lit by the moon ... night was imperceptibly succeeded by day, the dawn and the sun." The play was followed by a ball in a different setting, "circumscribed by the laws of Poetry." "The curtain fell, a golden 'bridge' was rolled out from the stage to the foot of the royal scaffold, and the curtain rose on a great room painted in perspective, gilded and enriched by magnificent ornaments, and lit by sixteen chandeliers. Her Majesty crossed the 'bridge' to the stage followed by ladies and the ball began."

On 7 February 1641, Richelieu produced in the Grande Salle the last of the political ballets of King Louis XIII's reign, the Ballet de la prosperité des armes de France. According to Robert M. Isherwood, Richelieu brought the celebrated Italian designer of sets and stage machinery Giacomo Torelli to Paris for the production. The ballet had several sets depicting the fields of Arras, the plain of Casal, the snow covered Alps, as well as a stormy sea and hell and heaven. The sets were changed rapidly via a system of weights and levers.

Depictions of the Grande Salle of the Palais-Cardinal

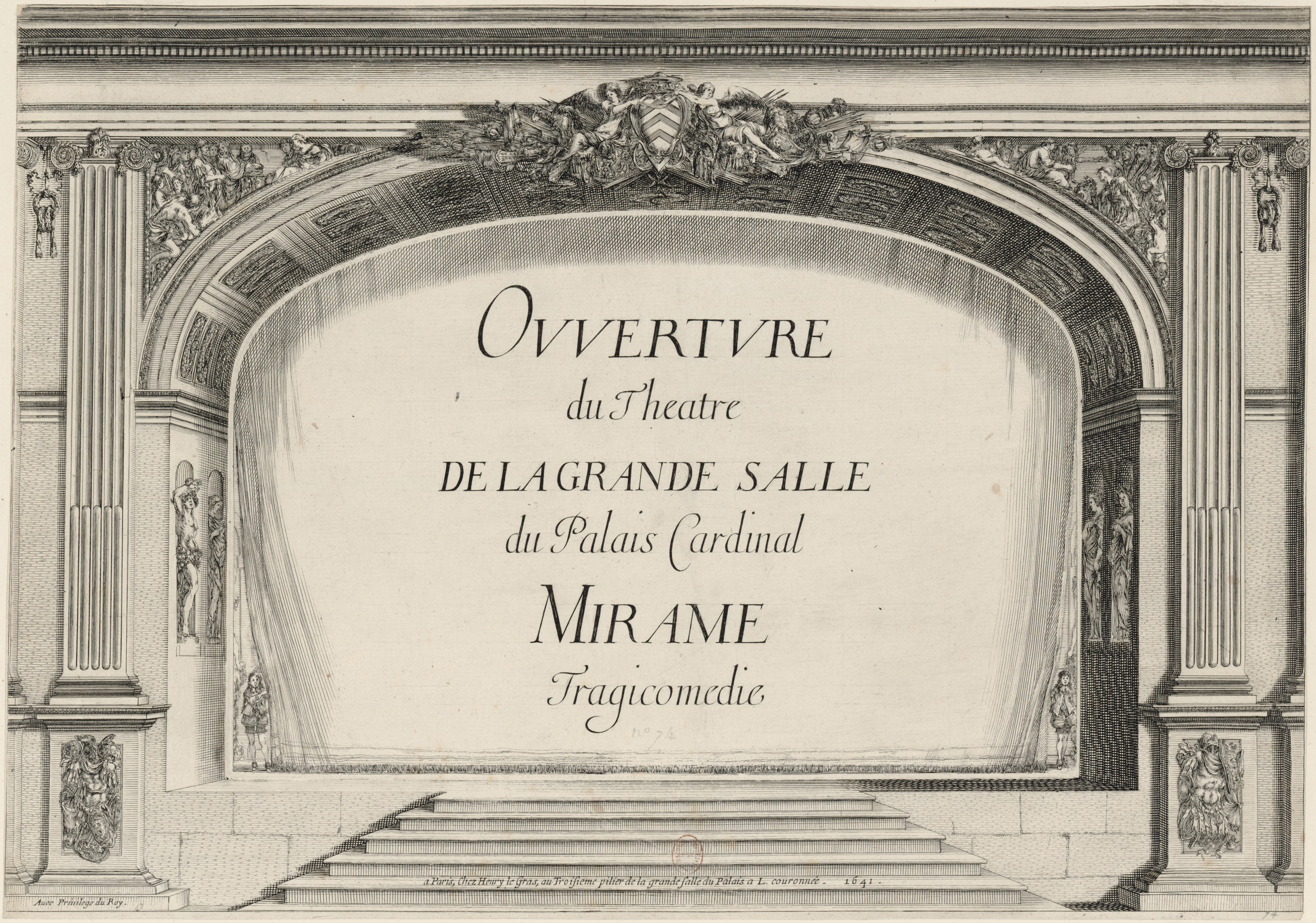
Proscenium arch with a drop-curtain for Desmarets' Mirame (1641), engraving by Stefano della Bella

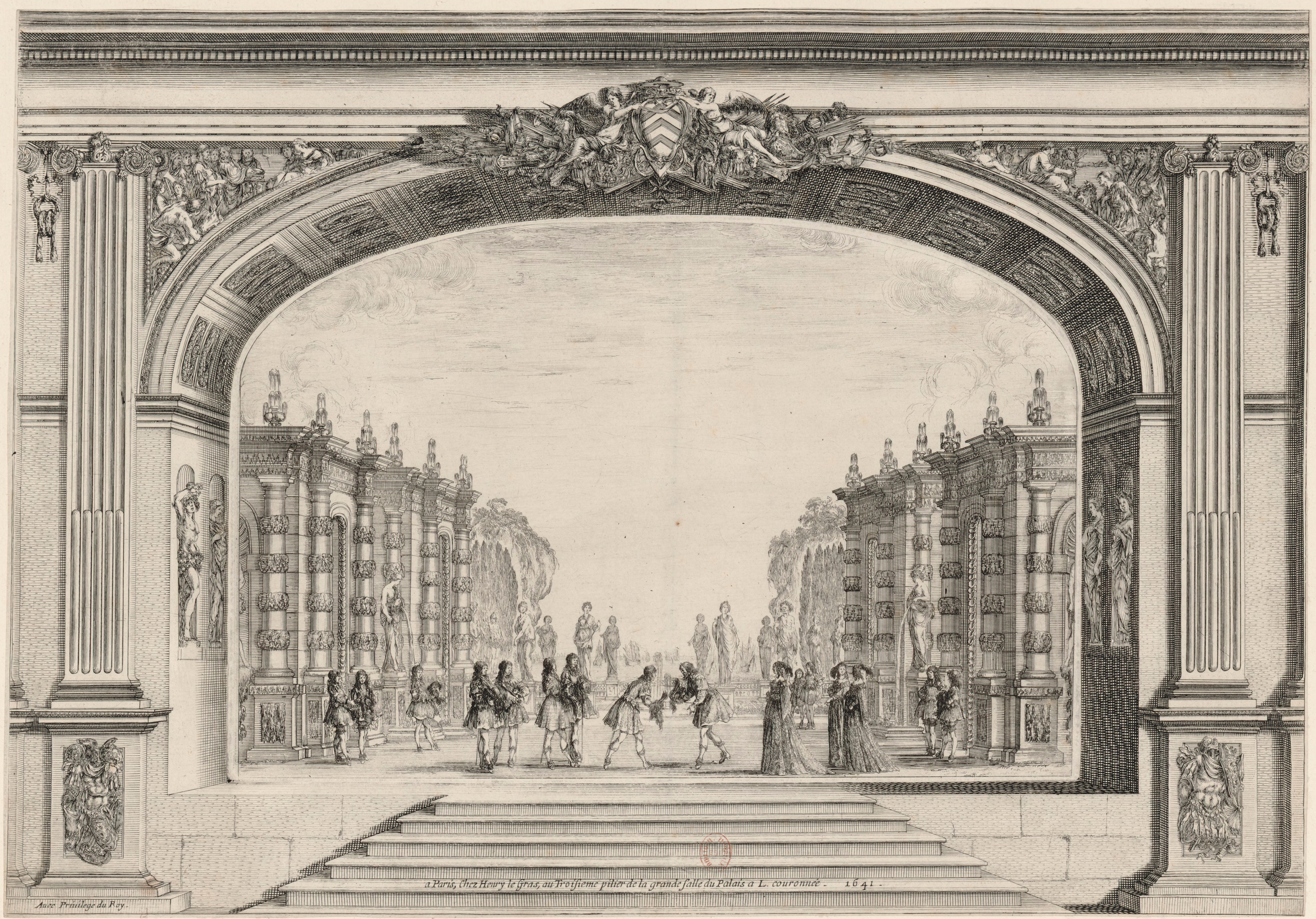
Perspective set for Mirame, Act 1, engraving by Stefano della Bella

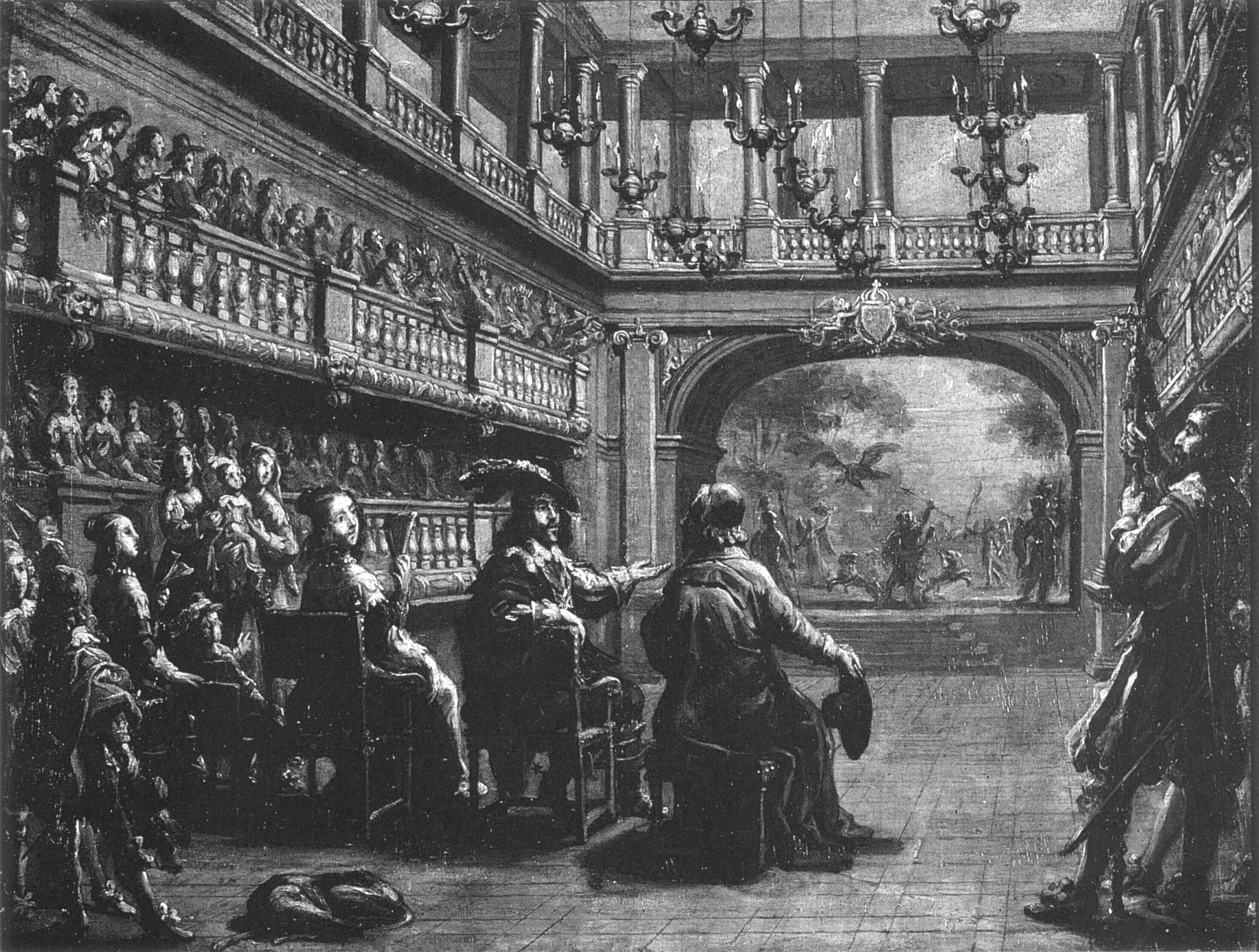
The royal family and Richelieu at the ballet La Prospérité des Armes de la France, which premiered on 7 February 1641 (grisaille by Justus van Egmont)

Gabriel Gilbert's play Téléphonte was probably produced in the theatre in 1641 and performed by the combined troupes of the Théâtre du Marais and the Hôtel de Bourgogne. Richelieu's last production there was Desmarets' play Europe, a political allegory celebrating Richelieu's career and "the triumph of France over her enemies on the Continent." The play was in rehearsal in the Grande Salle when Richelieu died.

=== Cardinal Mazarin ===
Upon Richelieu's death on 4 December 1642, he left the property to Louis XIII, and it became known as the Palais-Royal, although the name Palais-Cardinal sometimes still continued to be used. Louis XIII died a few months later, on 14 May 1643, and despite his will, his widow, Queen Anne of Austria, at the request of her son, the four-year-old King Louis XIV, became regent without restrictions on 18 May. Anne, the king and his younger brother Philippe moved from the Louvre to the Palais-Royal in October, and her first minister, Cardinal Mazarin, moved there a few months later. Anne was fond of Italian theatre and music, and Mazarin arranged for Italian actors and singers to come to Paris to perform. The establishment of a resident Italian opera became state policy, and the Palais-Royal became the venue for a number of Italian productions.

The first, on 28 February 1645, was a comédie italienne, which may have been Marco Marazzoli's Il Giudizio della Ragione tra la Beltà e l'Affetto (1643), although this has been disputed. Egisto (previously thought to be a version of Egisto with music by Francesco Cavalli, but now believed to be the 1639 comic opera Egisto ovvero Chi soffre speri, with music by Virgilio Mazzocchi and Marco Marazzoli) was given at the Palais-Royal on 13 February 1646. Luigi Rossi's new opera Orfeo premiered in the theatre on 2 March 1647, "on the eve of the Fronde, as criticism of Mazarin's fiscal policies was mounting". Giacomo Torelli designed the sets and theatre machinery and remodeled the theatre for the production, Mazarin's enemies considered the costs of the production excessive. François de Paule de Clermont, marquis de Montglat, put them at 400,000 livres, while Guy Joly claimed 500,000, saying "sovereign societies who are tormented and see well by this excessive and superfluous expense, that the needs of the state are not so pressing that one could spare them easily if one wished it." These sources may have exaggerated the cost: Mazarin's librarian, Gabriel Naudé stated the expenses only came to 30,000 écus (90,000 livres).

=== Molière ===
The troupe of Molière and the Comédie-Italienne put on the shows here between 1660 and 1673. Molière's most notable plays were performed here, including L'École des femmes (first performed 26 December 1662), Tartuffe (12 May 1664), Dom Juan (15 February 1665), Le Misanthrope (4 June 1666), L'Avare (9 September 1668), Le Bourgeois gentilhomme (23 November 1670), and Le malade imaginaire (10 February 1673).

=== Paris Opera ===
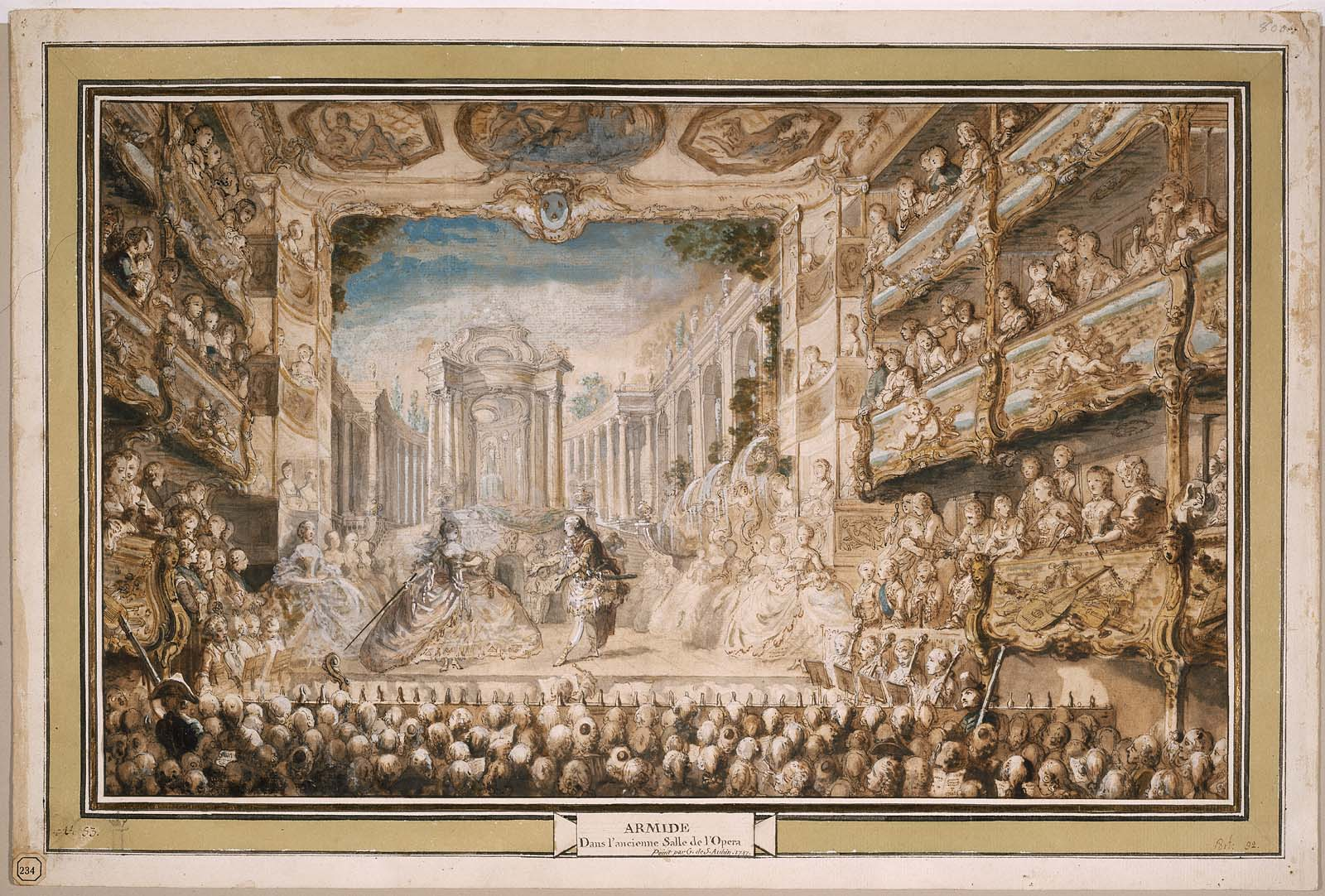
Lully's Armide as performed at the first Salle du Palais-Royal in the revival of 1761

On the death of his old collaborator, Lully ejected Molière's troupe to a new home at the Hôtel de Guénégaud and re-used the theatre as the opera house of the Académie royale de Musique (the name of the Paris Opera at the time). Lully had much building work done on it in order to allow the installation of new stage machinery designed by Carlo Vigarani, capable of supporting the imposing sets of the operas he would later put on here. This replaced the old machinery designed by Giacomo Torelli in 1645. After Vigarani's modifications the theatre had a total capacity of about 1,270 spectators: a parterre for 600 standing, amphitheatre seating for 120, and boxes with balconies accommodating another 550. The stage was 9.4 meters across and 17 meters deep, with space in front for the orchestra 7.6 meters across and 3 meters deep.

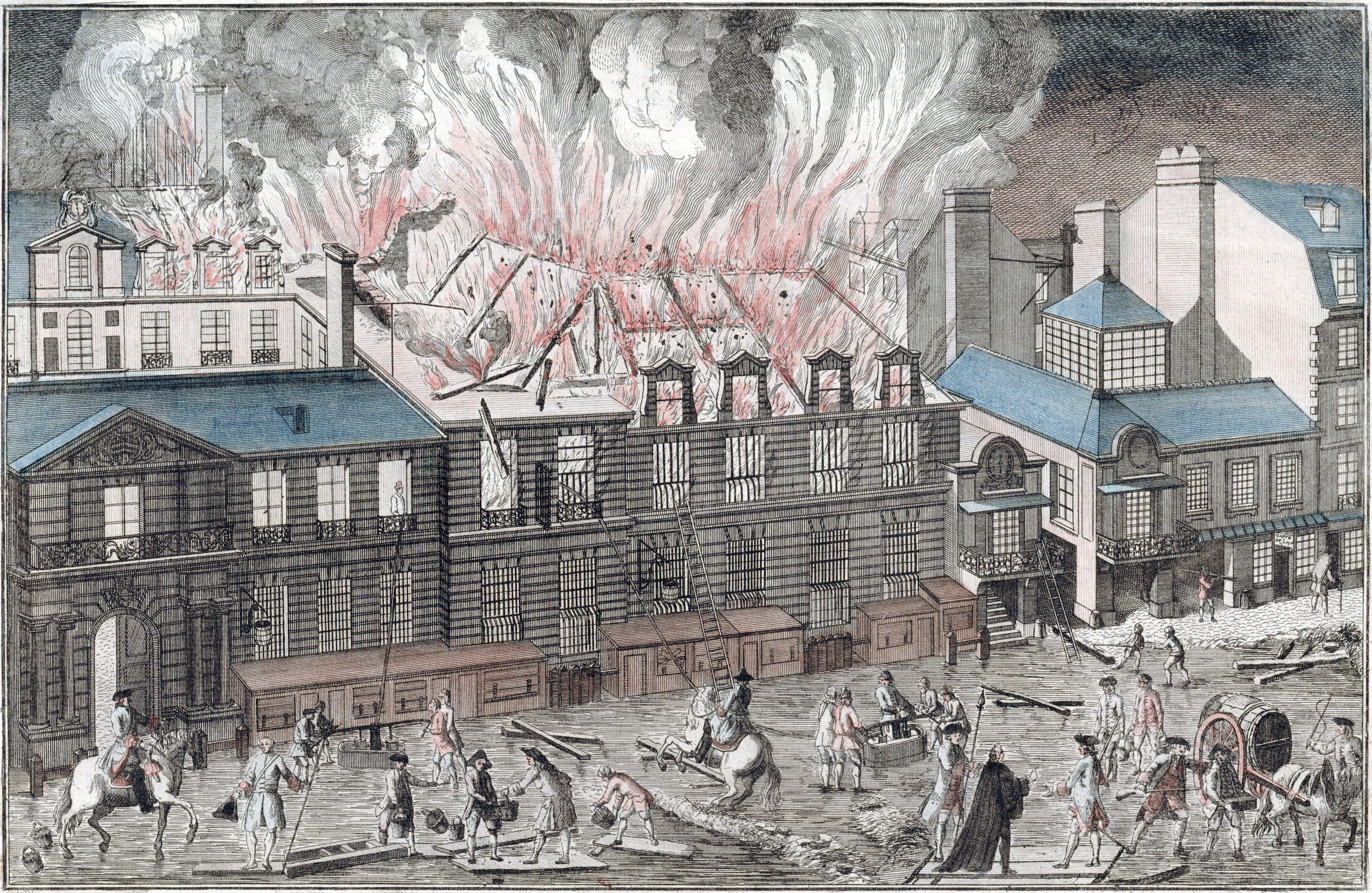
Fire of 1763

Several of Lully's operas (tragédies en musique) were premiered at the Palais-Royal, including Alceste (19 January 1674), Amadis (18 January 1684), and Armide (15 February 1686). In the 18th century many of Rameau's works were first performed here, including Hippolyte et Aricie (1 October 1733), Les Indes galantes (23 August 1735), Castor et Pollux (24 October 1737), Dardanus (19 November 1739), and Zoroastre (5 December 1749).

The Opera's first theatre was destroyed by fire on 6 April 1763.

== Second theatre ==
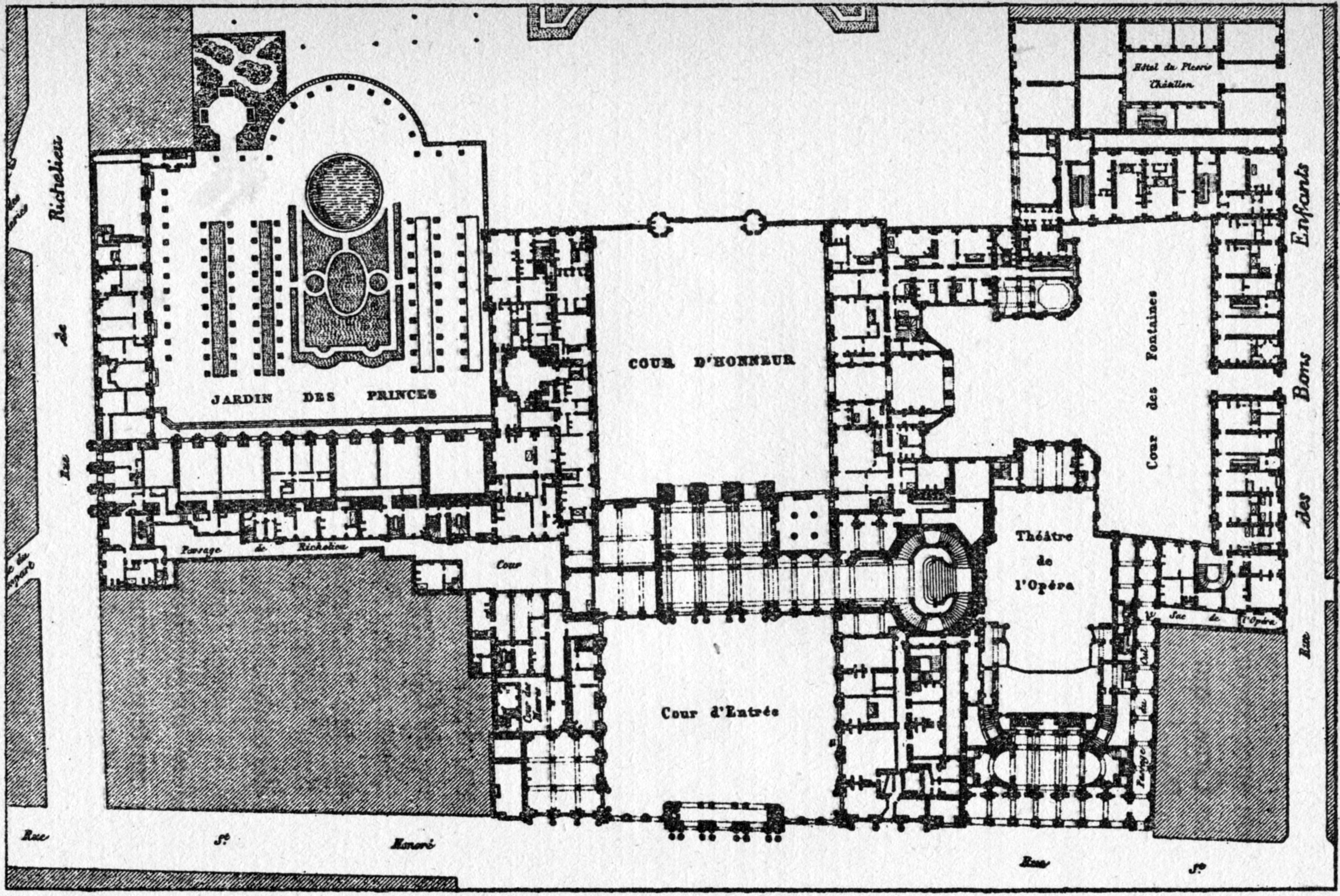
1780 plan of the Palais-Royal with Moreau's opera house in the lower right quadrant

The city of Paris, which was responsible for the opera house, decided to build a new theatre on a site slightly further to the east (where the rue de Valois is located today: 48.862814°N 2.337561°E). In the meantime the company performed in the Salle des Machines in the Tuileries Palace, which was first reduced to a size more suitable for opera by the architect Jacques-Germain Soufflot. The new theatre in the Palais-Royal was designed by architect Pierre-Louis Moreau Desproux and was the first purpose-built opera house in Paris. It had a capacity of more than 2,000 spectators.

The new theatre opened on 20 January 1770 with a performance of Rameau's Zoroastre. It is especially noteworthy as the theatre where most of the French operas of Christoph Willibald Gluck were first performed, including Iphigénie en Aulide (19 April 1774), Orphée et Eurydice (the French version of Orfeo ed Euridice) (2 August 1774), the revised version of Alceste (23 April 1776), Armide (23 September 1777), Iphigénie en Tauride (18 May 1779), and Echo et Narcisse (24 September 1779). Among the many other works premiered here are Piccinni's Atys (22 February 1780), Grétry's Andromaque (6 June 1780), Philidor's Persée (27 October 1780), and Piccinni's Iphigénie en Tauride (23 January 1781).

On 3 March 1778, the theatre was the scene of an incident that escalated into a scandal within a matter of days and ultimately culminated, on 16 March 1778, in a duel between two high-ranking members of the French royal family. The affair is known as: An Incident at the Opera Ball on Mardi Gras in 1778.

The theatre continued to be used by the Opera until 8 June 1781, when it too was destroyed by fire. The Théâtre de la Porte Saint-Martin, much further to the north on the Boulevard Saint-Martin, was hurriedly built in two months to replace it. In the meantime the opera company performed in the Salle des Menus-Plaisirs on the rue Bergère.

Architectural drawings of the second Salle du Palais-Royal (1770–1781)

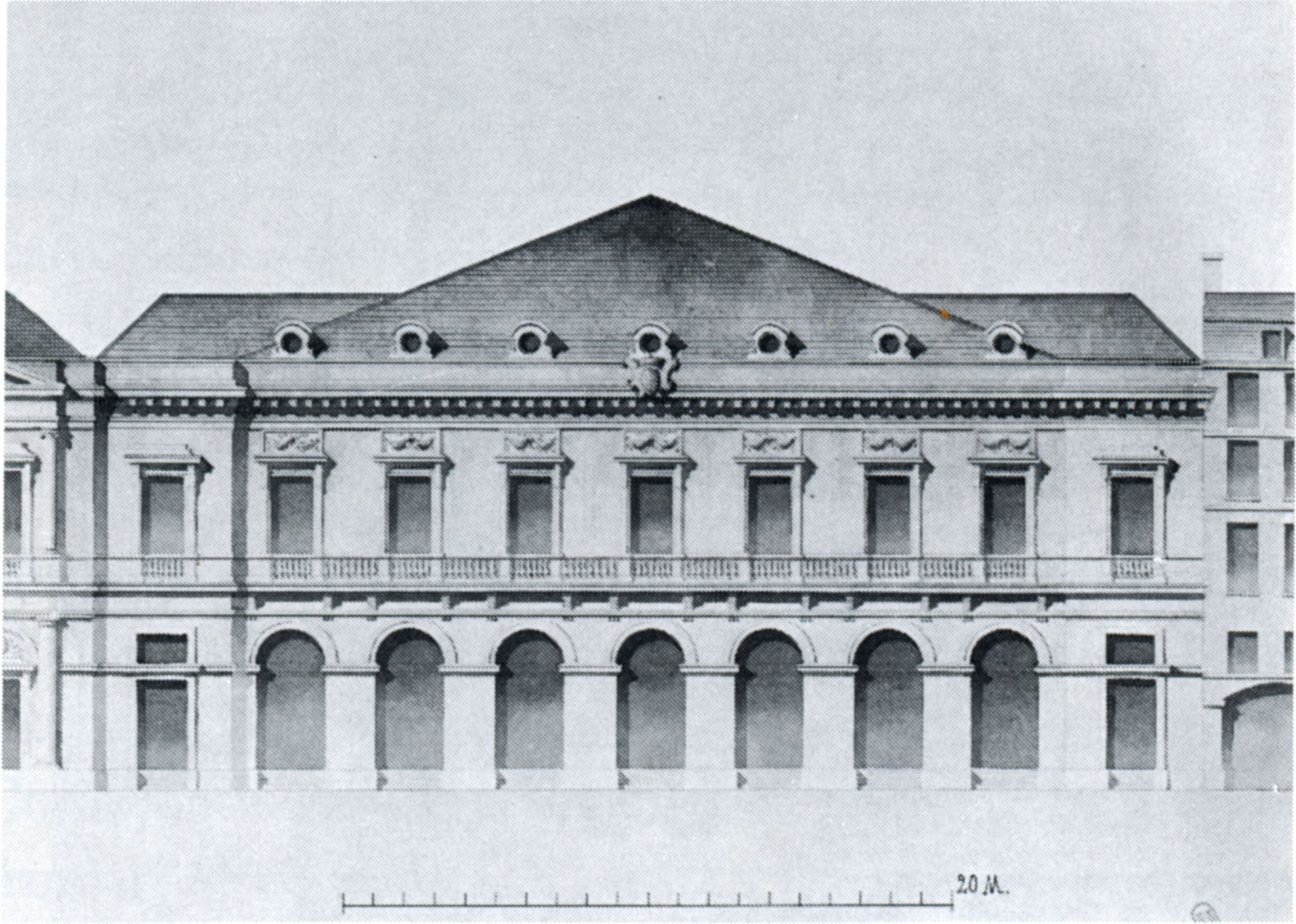
Facade of Moreau's opera house

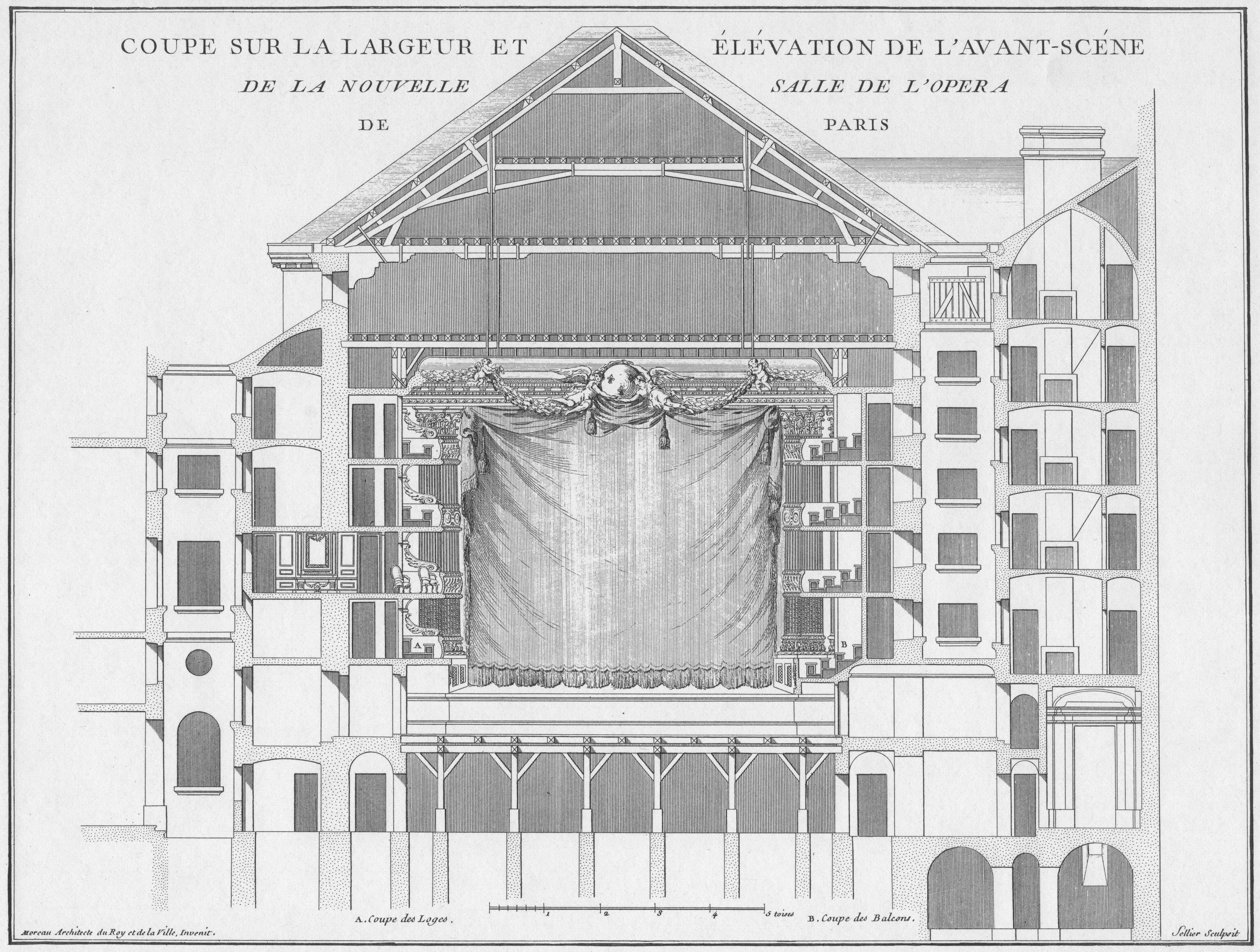
Transverse section

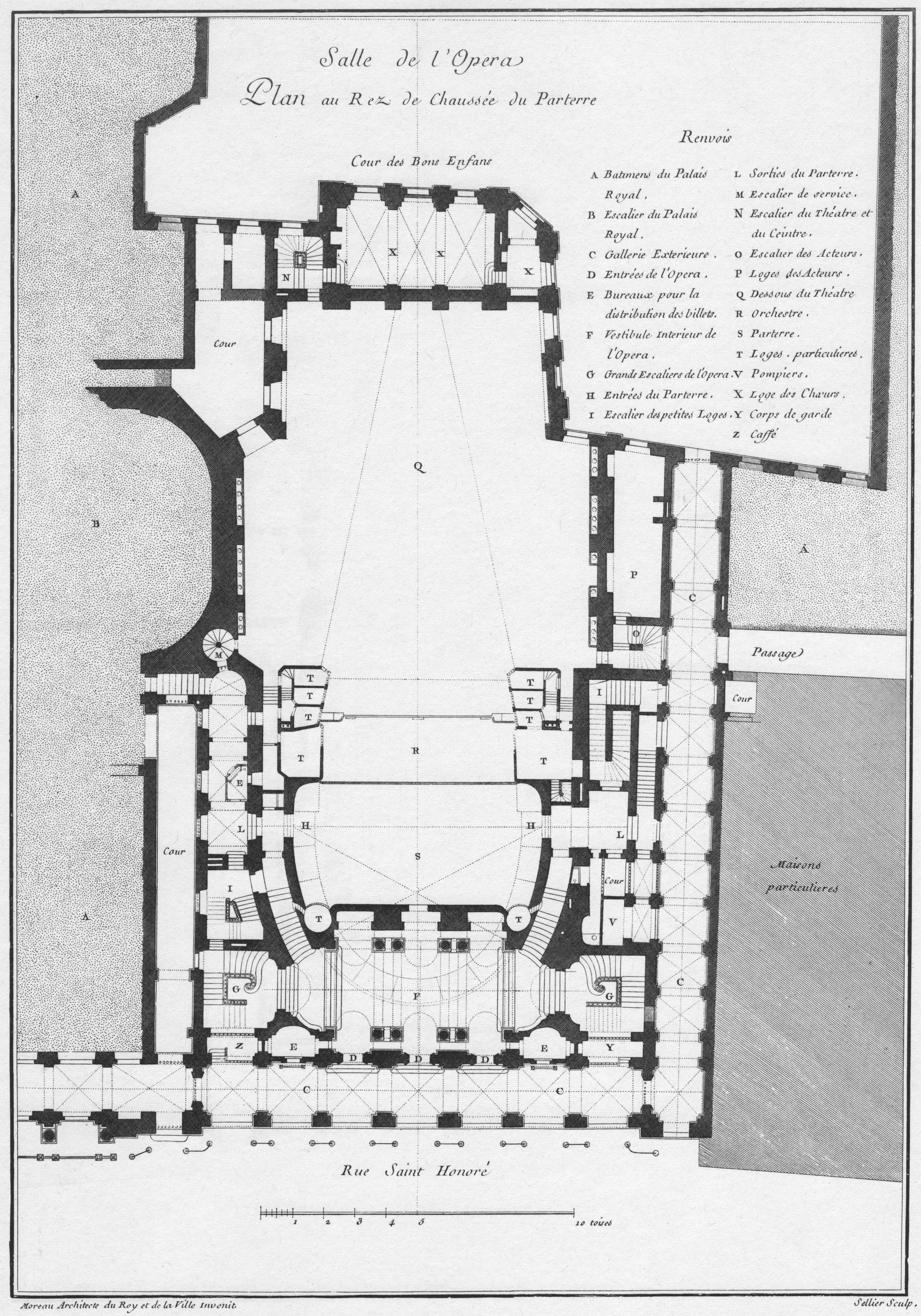
Ground-level floorplan

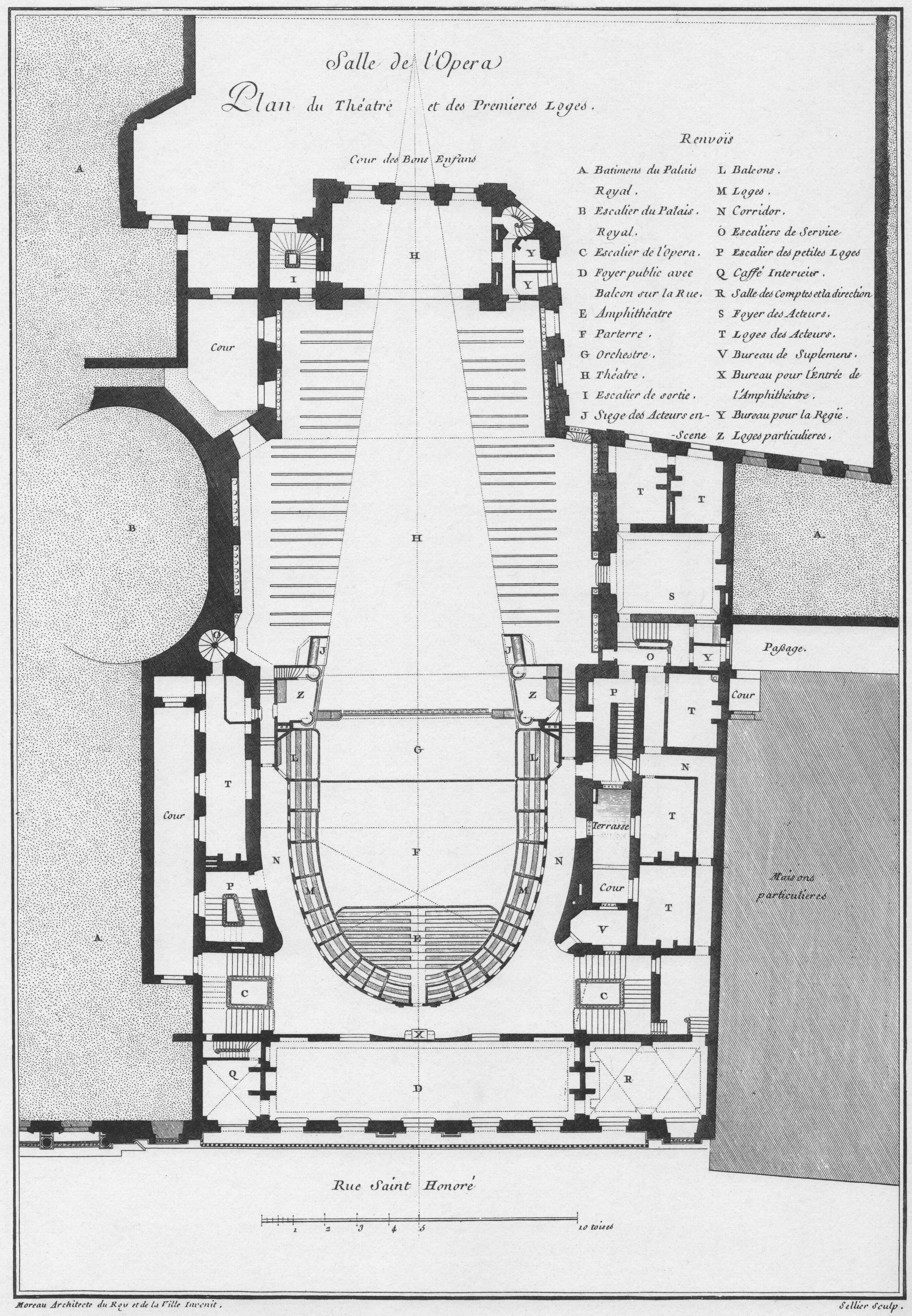
First-loges level
Destruction of the second Salle du Palais-Royal by fire

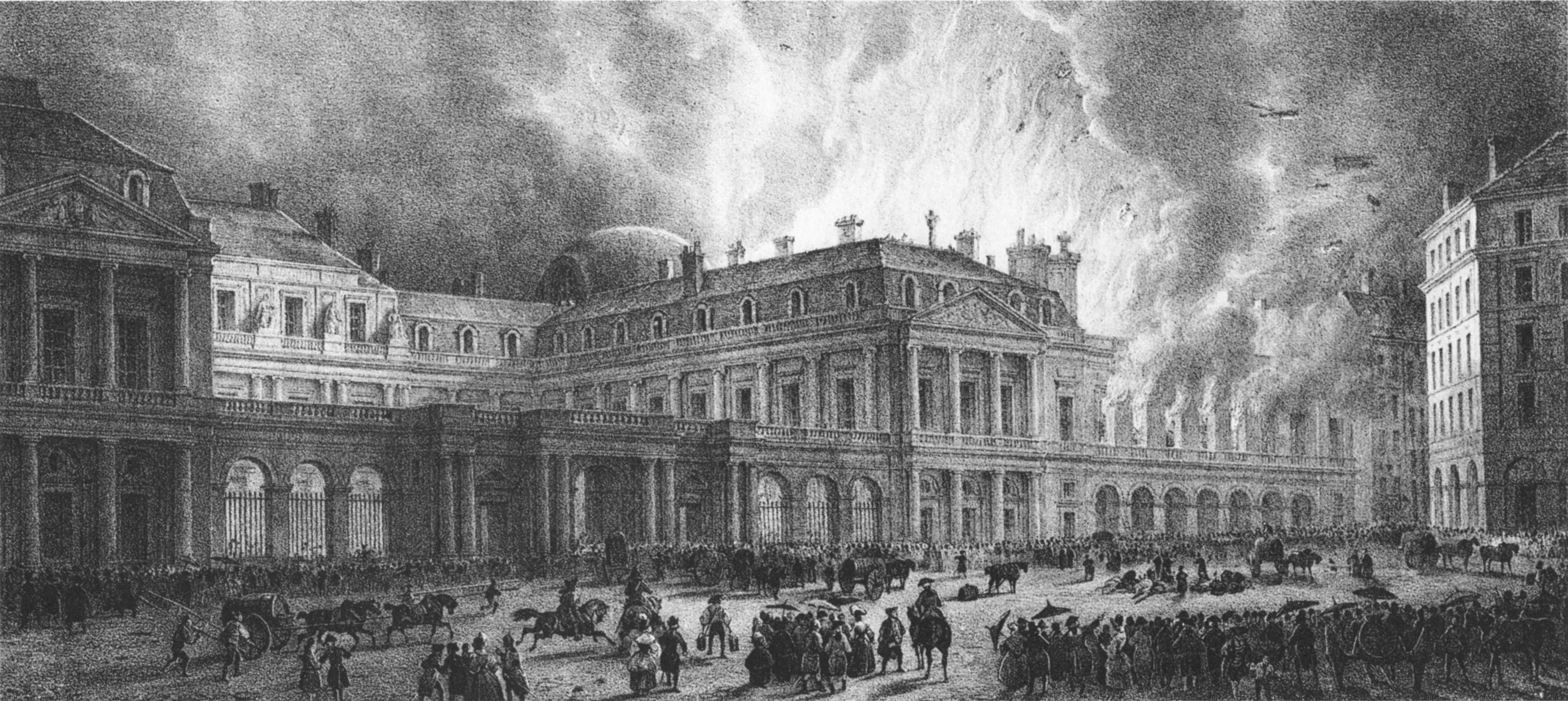
8 June 1781

9 June

== See also ==
- Hôtel de Bourgogne (theatre)
- Théâtre du Marais
