= Gabriel Gilbert =

French poet and playwright

- Born: c. 1620
- Died: c. 1680
- Occupations: Poet; playwright

Gabriel Gilbert (c.1620 – c.1680) was a 17th-century French poet and playwright.

He was secretary of duchesse de Rohan and secretary of commandments by Christina, Queen of Sweden in 1656.

He wrote tragicomedies and tragedies, including Marguerite de France, Téléphonte, Rodogune, Sémiramis, Hypolite ou le garçon insensible, Les Amours de Diane et d'Endymion.

== Publications ==
- 1641: Marguerite de France, tragicomedy Text online
- 1642: Téléphonte, five-act tragicomedy in verse Text online
- 1646: Rodogune, tragicomedy Text online
- 1646: Hypolite, ou Le garçon insensible, tragedy, Text online
- 1647: Sémiramis, tragedy, Text online
- 1650: Panégyrique des dames, dedicated to Mademoiselle
- 1656: L'Art de plaire, text online
- 1657: Les Amours de Diane et d'Endimion, tragedy Text online
- 1659: Chresphonte, ou le Retour des Héraclides dans le Péloponèse, tragicomedy
- 1659: Ode à son Eminence
- 1660: Arie et Petus, ou les Amours de Néron, tragedy
- 1661: Les Poésies diverses de M. Gilbert
- 1663: Les Amours d'Ovide pastorale héroïque
- 1664: Les Amours d'Angélique et de Médor, tragicomedy, text online
- 1667: Les Intrigues amoureuses, comedy
- 1672: Les Peines et les Plaisirs de l'amour, pastorale, presented at the Académie royale de musique
- 1680: Les Psaumes en vers français

== Bibliography ==
- Eleanor Jeanne Pellet. A forgotten French dramatist, Gabriel Gilbert. The Johns Hopkins Press (Baltimore) ; Les Presses universitaires de France (Paris).
