= List of compositions by Christoph Willibald Gluck =

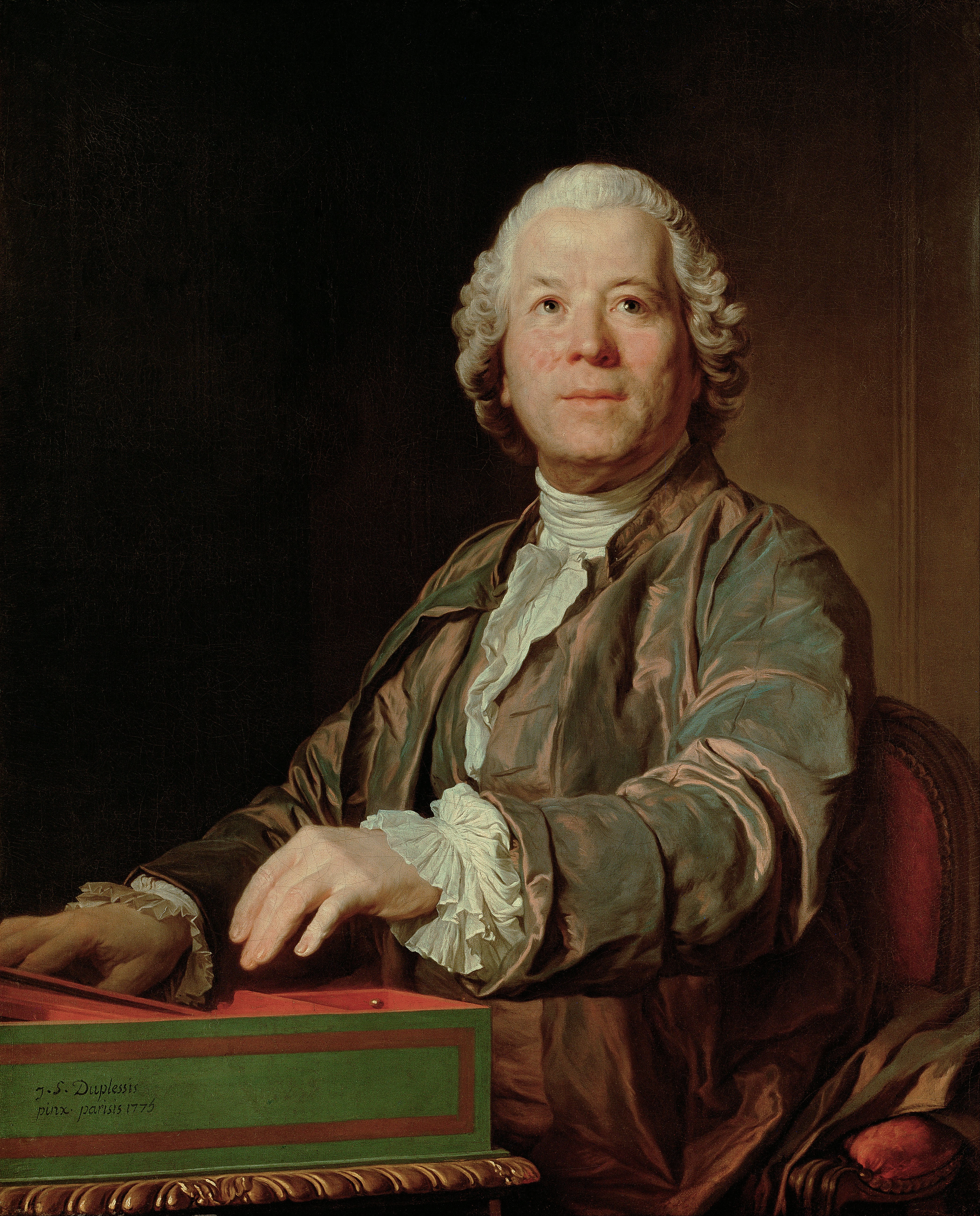
Portrait of Christoph Willibald Gluck by Joseph Duplessis, dated 1775

This is a list of compositions by Christoph Willibald Gluck.

Wq. Number by Alfred Wotquenne (1867–1939).

== Opera ==
- Wq. 1 – Artaserse (1741)
- Wq. 2 – Demetrio – or Cleonice (1742)
- Wq. 3 – Demofoonte (1743)
- Wq. 4 – Artemene (1743), 1st version
- – Il Tigrane (1743)
- Wq. 5 – La Sofonisba – Siface (1744)
- Wq. 6 – La finta schiava (1744)
- Wq. 7 – Ipermestra (1744)
- Wq. 8 – Poro (1744)
- Wq. 9 – Ippolito – Fedra (1745)
- Wq. 10 – La caduta de' giganti (1746)
- Wq. 11 – Artemene (1746), 2nd version
- Wq. 12 – Le nozze d'Ercole e d'Ebe (1747)
- Wq. 13 – La Semiramide riconosciuta (1748)
- Wq. 14 – La contesa dei numi (1749)
- Wq. 15 – Ezio (1749), 1st version; Revised in 1763
- Wq. 16 – La clemenza di Tito (1752)
- Wq. 17 – Issipile (1751–1752)
- Wq. 18 – Le cinesi (1754)
- Wq. 19 – La danza (1755)
- Wq. 20 – L'innocenza giustificata (1755), Revised as La vestale (1768)
- Wq. 55 – Les amours champêtres (1755)
- Wq. 21 – Antigono (1756)
- Wq. 22 – Il re pastore (1756)
- Wq. 23 – L'île de Merlin, ou Le monde renversé (1758)
- Wq. 24 – La fausse esclave (1758)
- Wq. 25 – L'arbre enchanté, ou Le tuteur dupé (1759), 1st version
- Wq. 26 – La Cythère assiégée (1759)
- – Le diable à quatre, ou La double métamorphose (1759)
- Wq. 27 – Tetide (1760)
- Wq. 28 – L’ivrogne corrigé (Der bekehrte Trunkenbold) (1760)
- Wq. 29 – Le cadi dupé (Der betrogene Kadi) (1761)
- – Arianna (Pasticcio) (1762)
- Wq. 30 – Orfeo ed Euridice (1762), Italian version
- Wq. 31 – Il trionfo di Clelia (1763)
- – Ezio (1763), 2nd version
- Wq. 32 – La rencontre imprévue – Les pèlerins de la Mecque (1764)
- – Enea e Ascanio (1764)
- Wq. 33 – Il Parnaso confuso (1765)
- Wq. 34 – Telemaco, ossia L’isola di Circe (1765)
- Wq. 35 – La corona (1765)
- Wq. 36 – Il prologo (1767)
- Wq. 37 – Alceste, Italian version of Alceste, Wq. 44 (1767)
- – La vestale (1768), Revision of L’innocenza giustificata, Wq. 20 (1755)
- Wq. 38 – Le feste d'Apollo (1769)
1. Prologue
2. Bauci e Filemone
3. Aristeo
4. Orfeo (Early version of Orfeo ed Euridice)
- – Philémon et Baucis, Opéra-Ballet
- Wq. 39 – Paride ed Elena (1770)
- – Die unvermuthete Zusammenkunft (1772), German version of La rencontre imprévue, Wq. 32 (1764)
- Wq. 40 – Iphigénie en Aulide (1774)
- Wq. 41 – Orphée et Eurydice (1774), French version of Orfeo ed Euridice, Wq. 30 (1762)
- Wq. 42 – L’arbre enchanté, ou Le tuteur dupé (1775), 2nd version
- Wq. 43 – La Cythère assiégée, Opéra-Ballet (1775), Revision of the 1759 opera
- Wq. 44 – Alceste (1776), French version of Alceste, Wq. 37 (1767)
- Wq. 45 – Armide (1777)
- Wq. 46 – Iphigénie en Tauride (1779), French version
- Wq. 47 – Echo et Narcisse (1779), 1st version
- – Echo et Narcisse (1780), 2nd version
- – Iphegenie auf Tauris (1781), German version of Iphigénie en Tauride, Wq. 46 (1779)

== Ballet-Pantomime ==
- Wq. 51 – L’Orfano della china (1761), [doubtful work]
- Wq. 52 – Don Juan, ou Le festin de Pierre (1761)
- – La Citera assediata (1762), Dance version of La Cythère assiégée, [music lost]
- – Alessandro (Les amours d’Alexandre et de Roxane) (c.1755)
- Wq. 56 – Semiramis (1765)
- – Iphigénie (1765), [music lost]
- – Marche in G major

== Orchestral ==
- – Sinfonia No.1 in F major
- – Sinfonia No.2 in D major
- – Sinfonia No.3 in D major
- – Sinfonia No.4 in D major
- – Sinfonia No.5 in D major
- – Sinfonia No.6 in E major
- – Sinfonia No.7 in F major
- – Sinfonia No.8 in G major
- – Sinfonia No.9 in F major
  - About 18 Sinfonias total, some doubtful works
- – Flute Concerto, in G major, [doubtful work]
- – Violin Concerto, in G major, arr of the flute concerto

== Chamber ==
- (Wq. 53) – mis-attributed to Gluck – Six Trio Sonatas for 2 violins and basso continuo, publ. 1746
1. in C major
2. in G minor
3. in A major
4. in B♭ major
5. in E♭ major
6. in F major
- (Wq. 54) – mis-attributed to Gluck – Trio Sonata in E major for 2 violins and basso continuo
- GluckWV 5.2.1 – authenticated Trio Sonata in F major for 2 violins and basso continuo

== Sacred Vocal ==
- – Miserere (1744–1745), [music lost]
- – 2 Motets (1779)
- Wq. 59 – Almæ sedes, Motet for Solo and Orchestra (c.1785)
- Wq. 59 – Voces cantate
- Wq. 50 – De profundis, Motet for Chorus and Orchestra (1782)

== Vocal ==
- Wq. 48 – Morceaux de chant détachés
1. Oh Dei che dolce incanto, for soprano and orchestra
2. Per tutto il timore, for soprano and orchestra
3. Benché copra al sole il volto (1749), for soprano and orchestra
4. Và, ti sarò fedele, for soprano and orchestra
5. Pace, Amor, torniamo in pace, Cantate de Métastase
6. Che legge spietata, for soprano, flute solo and orchestra
7. Berenice, ove sei; Ombre che pallida, Scene and Aria for soprano and orchestra
8. Ah pietà se di me senti, Duetto for Soprano, alto and orchestra
9. Nò, che non ha la sorte; Si, vedrò quell'alma ingrata, Recitativo and Aria for soprano and orchestra
- Wq. 49 – 7 Oden und Lieder (c.1773~1785, published 1786)
1. Vaterlandlied
2. Wir und Sie
3. Schlachtgesang
4. Der Jüngling (2nd version)
5. Die Sommernacht
6. Die frühen Gräber
7. Die Neigung
- Wq. 57 – Der Jüngling, 1st version (1775), [doubtful work]
- Wq. 60 – Amour en ces lieux for Voice, 2 violins and bass (c.1780)
- Wq. 61 – Quand la beauté lance for Voice, 2 violins and bass (c.1780)
- Wq. 58 – Ode an den Tod (c.1783, Published 1792)
- Wq. 62 – Die Sommernacht, 2nd version (1785)
- Wq. 63 – Minona lieblich und hold haucht reine Liebe, Duet (Published 1795)
- – Siegsgesang für Freie (Published 1795)
- – I lamenti d’amore, Cantata arranged from Alceste, Act III
- – Blütenmai herbei!
- – Einem Bach der fließt
- – In einem kühlen Grunde

== Works without Wq number ==
- Hoch tut euch auf
