= List of operas by Christoph Willibald Gluck =

The composer Christoph Willibald Gluck (1714–1787) is best known for his operas, of which he wrote 49 in all. His most significant and well-known work is Orfeo ed Euridice.

== List ==
Operas by Christoph Willibald Gluck
Title	Genre	Acts	Libretto	Premiere		Notes
Title	Genre	Acts	Libretto	Date	Venue	Notes
Artaserse	dramma per musica	3 acts	Metastasio	26 December 1741	Milan, Regio Ducale	2 arias preserved
Demetrio (Cleonice)	dramma per musica	3 acts	Metastasio	2 May 1742	Venice, S Samuele	8 arias preserved
Demofoonte	dramma per musica	3 acts	Metastasio's Demofonte	6 January 1743	Milan, Regio Ducal	sinfonia, recitative and one aria lost
Il Tigrane	dramma per musica	3 acts	Carlo Goldoni, after Francesco Silvani's La virtù trionfante dell'amore	26 September 1743	Crema	11 arias and a duet preserved
La Sofonisba	dramma per musica	3 acts	Metastasio	18 January 1744	Milan, Regio Ducal	10 arias and a duet preserved
Ipermestra	dramma per musica	3 acts	Metastasio	21 November 1744	Venice, Teatro San Giovanni Grisostomo	
Poro	dramma per musica	3 acts	Metastasio	26 December 1744	Turin, Teatro Regio	sinfonia, 4 arias and a duet preserved
Ippolito	dramma per musica	3 acts	G.G. Corio	31 January 1745	Milan, Regio Ducal	6 arias and a duet preserved
La caduta de' giganti	dramma per musica	2 acts	Francesco Vanneschi	7 January 1746	London, King's Theatre	5 arias and a duet preserved
Artamene	dramma per musica	3 acts	Francesco Vanneschi ?, after B Vitturi	4 March 1746	London, King's Theatre	6 arias preserved
Le nozze d'Ercole e d'Ebe	dramma per musica	2 acts		29 June 1747	Dresden, Pillnitz Castle	
La Semiramide riconosciuta	dramma per musica	3 acts	Metastasio	14 May 1748	Vienna, Burgtheater	
La contesa de' numi	festa teatrale	2 acts	Metastasio	9 April 1749	Copenhagen, Charlottenborg	
Ezio (first version)	dramma per musica	3 acts	Metastasio	Carnival, 1750	Prague	
Issipile	dramma per musica	3 acts	Metastasio	Carnival, 1752	Prague	3 arias preserved
La clemenza di Tito	dramma per musica	3 acts	Metastasio	4 November 1752	Naples, Teatro di San Carlo	
Le cinesi	componimento drammatico	1 act	Metastasio	24 September 1754	Schloss Hof, near Vienna	
La danza	componimento pastorale	1 act	Metastasio	5 May 1755	Laxenburg	
L'innocenza giustificata	festa teatrale	1 act	Giacomo Durazzo, after Metastasio	8 December 1755	Vienna, Burgtheater	
Antigono	dramma per musica	3 acts	Metastasio	9 February 1756	Rome, Teatro Argentina	
Il re pastore	dramma per musica	3 acts	Metastasio	8 December 1756	Vienna, Burgtheater	
La fausse esclave (revised as La vestale)	opéra comique	1 act	after Louis Anseaume and Pierre-Augustin Lefèvre de Marcouville's La fausse aventurière	8 January 1758	Vienna, Burgtheater	
L'île de Merlin, ou Le monde renversé	opéra comique	1 act	Louis Anseaume, after Alain-René Lesage and D'Orneval's Le monde renversé	3 October 1758	Vienna, Schönbrunn	
La Cythère assiégée (first version)	opéra comique	1 act	Charles Simon Favart, after Favart and Barthélemy-Christophe Fagou's Le puvoir de l'amour ou Le siegè de Cythère	New Year 1759	Vienna, Burgtheater	
Le diable à quatre, ou La double métamorphose	opéra comique	3 acts	Michel Jean Sedaine and Pierre Baurans, after Charles Coffey's The Devil to Pay	28 May 1759	Laxenburg	
L'arbre enchanté, ou Le tuteur dupé (first version)	opéra comique	1 act	after Jean-Joseph Vadé Le poirier	3 October 1759	Vienna, Schönbrunn	
L'ivrogne corrigé ou le mariage du diable	opéra comique	2 acts	Louis Anseaume and Jean-Baptiste Lourdet de Santerre	April 1760	Vienna, Burgtheater	
Tetide	serenata	2 acts	Giovanni Ambrogio Migliavacca	10 October 1760	Vienna, Hofburg	
Le cadi dupé	opéra comique	1 act	after Jean-Baptiste Lourdier	8 December 1761	Vienna, Burgtheater	
Orfeo ed Euridice	azione teatrale	3 acts	Ranieri de' Calzabigi	5 October 1762	Vienna, Burgtheater	score
Il trionfo di Clelia	dramma per musica	3 acts	Metastasio	14 May 1763	Bologna, Teatro Comunale	
Ezio (second version)	dramma per musica	3 acts	Metastasio	26 December 1763	Vienna, Burgtheater	
La rencontre imprévue	opéra comique	3 acts	L. H. Dancourt, after Alain-René Lesage and D'Orneval's Les pèlerins de la Mecque	7 January 1764	Vienna, Burgtheater	
Il Parnaso confuso	serenata	1 act	Metastasio	24 January 1765	Vienna, Schönbrunn	
Telemaco, ossia L'isola di Circe	dramma per musica	3 acts	Marco Coltellini, after Carlo Sigismondo Capece	30 January 1765	Vienna, Burgtheater	
La corona	azione teatrale	1 act	Metastasio	intended for 4 October 1765 but unperformed, premiere 13 November 1987	Vienna, Schönbrunn (1987)	
Il prologo		prologue	Lorenzo Ottavio del Rosso	22 February 1767	Florence, Teatro della Pergola	introductory music for an opera by Traetta
Alceste (Italian)	tragedia	3 acts	Calzabigi, after Euripides	26 December 1767	Vienna, Burgtheater	
Le feste d'Apollo		prologue and 3 acts	Gastone Rezzonico, Giuseppe Maria Pagnini, Giuseppe Pezzana, and Calzabigi	24 August 1769	Parma, Corte	
Paride ed Elena	dramma per musica	5 acts	Calzabigi	3 November 1770	Vienna, Burgtheater	
Iphigénie en Aulide	tragédie	3 acts	François-Louis Gand Le Bland Du Roullet, after Jean Racine	19 April 1774	Paris, Opéra (Palais-Royal)	score
Orphée et Eurydice (French version of Orfeo ed Euridice)	tragédie-opéra	3 acts	Pierre-Louis Moline, after Calzabigi	2 August 1774	Paris, Opéra (Palais-Royal)	score
L'arbre enchanté (second version)	opéra-comique	1 act	Pierre-Louis Moline, after Jean-Joseph Vadé	27 February 1775	Palace of Versailles	score
La Cythère assiégée (second version)	opéra-ballet	3 acts	Charles Simon Favart	1 August 1775	Paris, Opéra (Palais-Royal)	score
Alceste (French)	tragédie	3 acts	François-Louis Gand Le Bland Du Roullet, after Calzabigi	23 April 1776	Paris, Opéra (Palais-Royal)	score
Armide	drame-héroïque	5 acts	Philippe Quinault, after Torquato Tasso's La Gerusalemme liberata	23 September 1777	Paris, Opéra (Palais-Royal)	score
Iphigénie en Tauride	tragédie	4 acts	Nicolas-François Guillard, after Claude Guimond de La Touche	18 May 1779	Paris, Opéra (Palais-Royal)	score
Echo et Narcisse	drame lyrique	prologue and 3 acts	Louis Théodore Baron de Tschudi, after Ovid's Metamorphoses	first version: 24 September 1779, second version: 8 August 1780	Paris, Opéra (Palais-Royal)	score
Iphigenie auf Tauris (German)	tragisches Singspiel	4 acts	Johann Baptist von Alxinger and Gluck, after Guillard	23 October 1781	Vienna, Burgtheater	revision of Iphigénie en Tauride
