= Berching =

- Town
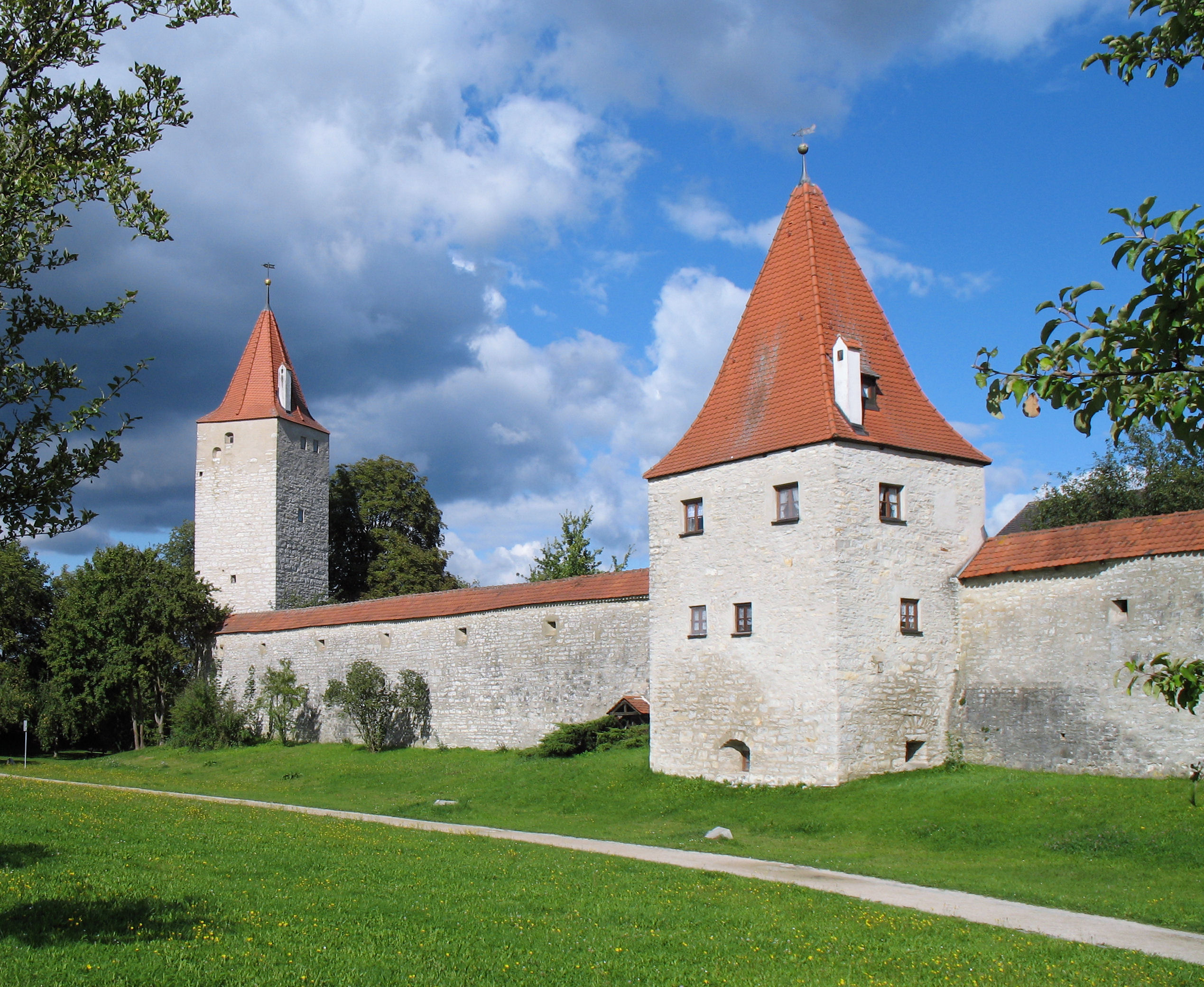
- Town walls of Berching

- Coat of arms

- Location of Berching within Neumarkt in der Oberpfalz district
- Interactive map of Berching
- Location within Germany Location within Bavaria
- Coordinates: 49°6′N 11°26′E
- Country: Germany
- State: Bavaria
- Admin. region: Oberpfalz
- District: Neumarkt in der Oberpfalz
- Subdivisions: 43 Ortsteile

Government
  - Mayor (2020–26): Ludwig Eisenreich (CSU)

Area
  - Total: 131.18 km^{2} (50.65 sq mi)
- Elevation: 385 m (1,263 ft)

Population (2025-12-31)
  - Total: 8,991
  - Density: 68.54/km^{2} (177.5/sq mi)
- Time zone: UTC+01:00 (CET)
  - Summer (DST): UTC+02:00 (CEST)
- Postal codes: 92334
- Dialling codes: 08462
- Vehicle registration: NM
- Website: www.berching.de

Berching (German pronunciation: [ˈbɛʁçɪŋ]; Bavarian: Bacham) is a town in the district of Neumarkt in Bavaria, Germany. It is today one of only four towns in Germany that still have completely intact city walls, along with Rothenburg ob der Tauber, Nördlingen and Dinkelsbühl, all in Bavaria.

Berching is a historical town with a fully preserved town wall and low streamlet. The first settlement was registered in 883, making it more than 1100 years old. Berching is located in the district of Neumarkt in Bavaria, Germany. It is situated on the Rhine-Main-Danube Canal, 20 km south of Neumarkt in der Oberpfalz. The old town or Altstadt is surrounded by a large wall interspaced with towers. One of the towers has been converted into a 6-story apartment. A small inn called Blaue Traube is located in the town center.

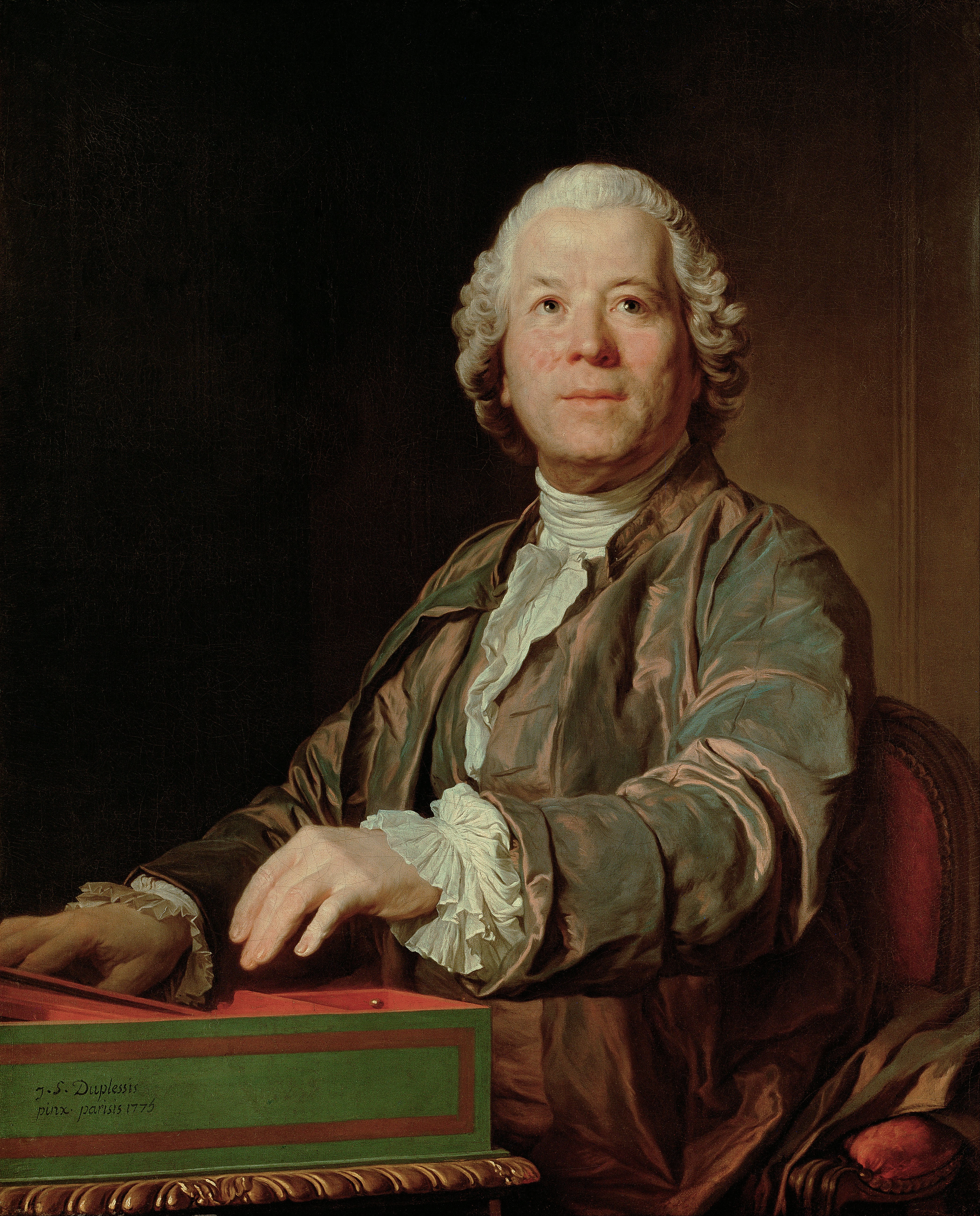
Portrait of Christoph Willibald Gluck by Joseph Duplessis, 1775

== Residents ==
- Christoph Willibald Gluck, (1714-1787), composer, was born in Weidenwang, today a district of Berching
- Claudia Brücken, (born 1963), singer, member of the bands Propaganda, Act and Onetwo

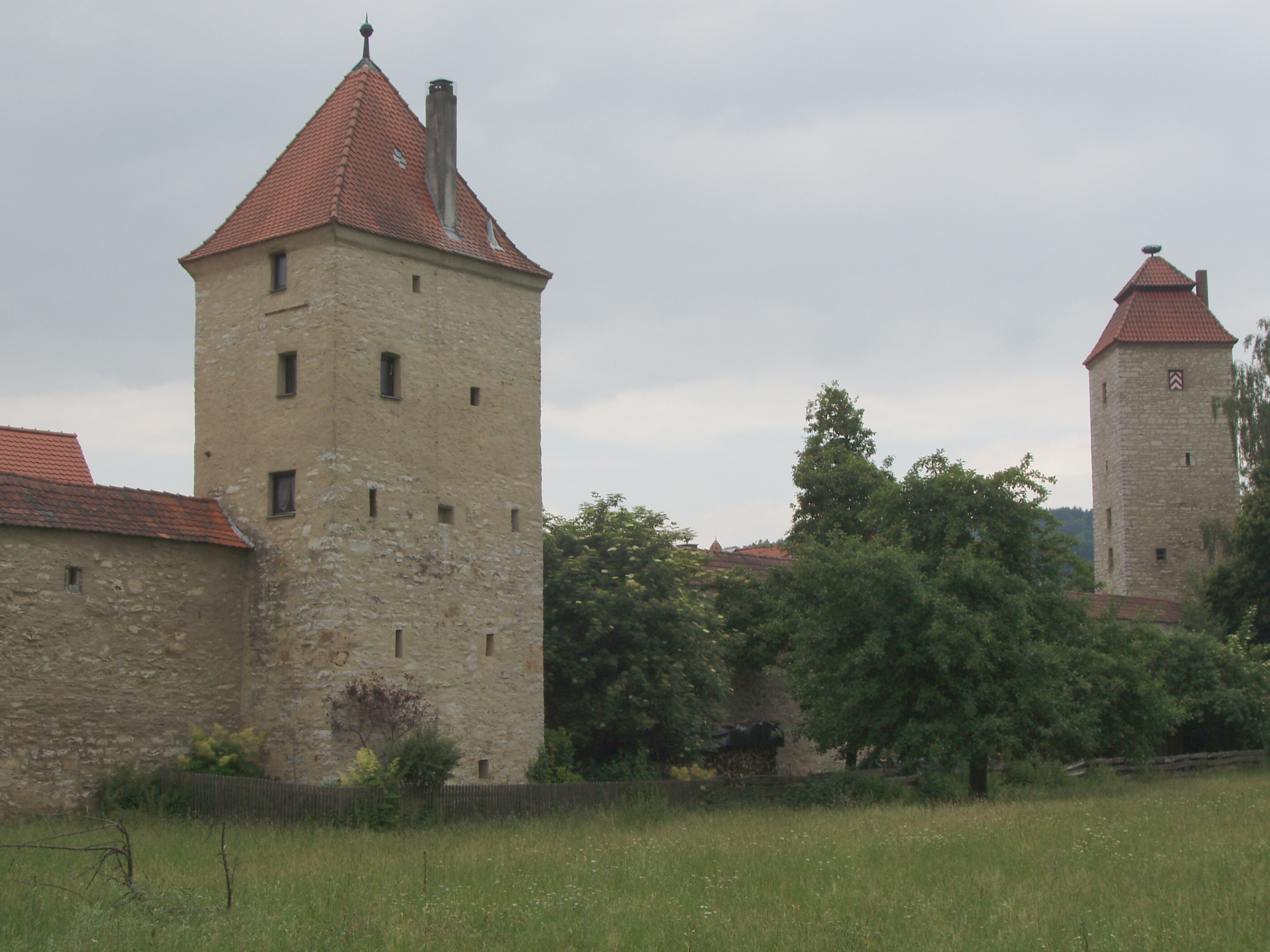
Historic old town tower converted into an apartment building
