= Joseph Friebert =

Austrian opera singer and composer (1724–1799)

Johann Joseph Friebert (4 December 1724 – 6 August 1799), also known as Giuseppe Fribert, was an Austrian opera singer and composer. Amongst his compositions were four singspiels, six operas, and several pieces of church music. As a singer, he was known for his lyrical tenor voice and sensitive interpretations. He created the roles of Silango in Gluck's Le cinesi and Tirso in Gluck's La danza.

Friebert was born in Gnadendorf in Lower Austria. He received his initial musical training from his father who was an organist in the local church and then at Melk Abbey where he was a chorister. From 1748 he studied in Vienna with Giuseppe Bonno and was subsequently engaged as a singer at the Hoftheater in Vienna. On his retirement from the stage, he served as the Kapellmeister at St. Stephen's Cathedral, Passau. Friebert died in Passau at the age of 74. His younger brother Karl (with whom he is often confused) was also a tenor singer, composer, and librettist.
