= Regina Mingotti =

Italian opera singer

Regina Mingotti, born in Naples 16 February 1722, died Neuburg an der Donau 1 October 1808, was an operatic soprano. Besides achieving great success as a performer in Germany, Spain, France, Britain and Italy, she composed and published songs and is notable for being the first woman to manage an opera company in London.

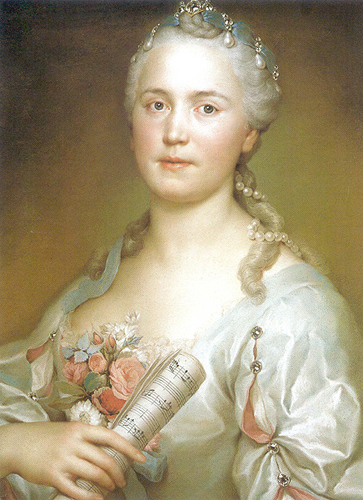
Regina Mingotti by Anton Raphael Mengs

== Training and career ==
Regina Mingotti's father was an officer in the Austrian army, stationed in Italy, where she was born. He was re-assigned to Grätz in Silesia, where he died, and Regina was put into the care of her uncle. He entered her into a convent, where she was given singing lessons.

She joined the opera company in Hamburg and sang there between 1743 and 1747, where she married the impresario Pietro Mingotti, but parted from him not long afterwards. While still with her husband, Regina relocated to Dresden, where she undertook further studies with the distinguished composer Nicola Porpora and scored great successes at the opera house, arousing the jealousy of that company's reigning prima donna Faustina Bordoni. In 1747, she created the role of Ercole (Hercules) in Gluck's Le nozze d'Ercole e d'Ebe and was highly praised for her acting skills throughout her career, especially in breeches roles such as this one. She spent 1751-1753 in Madrid, appearing in operas under the direction of the celebrated castrato Farinelli. Following that, she sang in Paris and made her debut in London, where she became a major star.

She composed and published songs there, and quarreled with the manager of the opera house where she appeared, attacking him in pamphlets she published under her own name. Regina had him dismissed, and took over the management of the theatre herself, while continuing to star in the performances. She thus became the first woman to manage an opera company in Britain. Her management of the opera company was very controversial. Tours of Italy followed her time in London, after which she retired first to Munich and then to Neuburg.

Regina Mingotti was fluent in German, French and Italian, to native speaker level. She also understood Latin, and could converse in English and Spanish. She was praised by English musicologist Charles Burney as a ‘perfect mistress of her art’ of singing and equal in "musical intelligence" to any composer he was familiar with.
