= Antigono (Gluck) =

Opera by Christoph Willibald Gluck

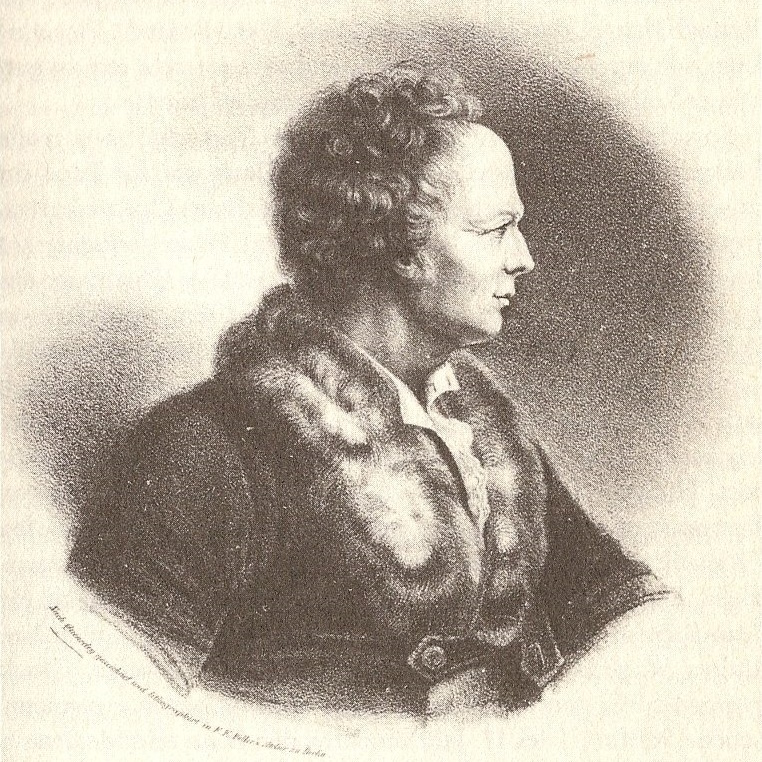
Portrait of Christoph Willibald Gluck, ca. 1750

Antigono is a three act opera seria composed by Christoph Willibald Gluck. It premiered February 9, 1756, at the Teatro Argentina in Rome. The Italian libretto was written by Pietro Metastasio, who was considered to be the most important opera seria librettist. Antigono was the only opera that Gluck ever premiered in Rome. This allowed him to reuse several arias and an entire introduction from some of his other operas, L'innocenza giustificata, Le cinesi, and La danza.

Gluck came to Rome from Vienna after Christmas in 1755. He worked quickly, since Antigono premiered only two months later. The premiere of the opera was sold out and the audience seemed to have enjoyed it; several arias and a duet were encored at the end of the show. After the premier of the opera, Pope Benedict XIV awarded Gluck with the title of Cavalier of the Order of the Golden Spur. This was an important honor for Gluck, which Wolfgang Amadeus Mozart had received previously. During Gluck's time in Rome, he was under the protection of Cardinal Albani.

Because the authorities in Rome had strict rules against women performing on the stage, the entire cast of Antigono was made up of men, including castrati. The opera was written for four sopranos, one contralto, and one tenor, who played the protagonist Antigono.

== Plot ==
The Macedonian King Antigono and his banished son Demetrio are both loved by the Egyptian princess Berenice. Antigono's daughter, Ismene, loves Alessandro, who is the enemy of Macedonia. The opera portrays a violent struggle between Antigono and Alessandro. Typical for opera seria plots, identities and the emotional relations between the characters become confused. Everything is resolved through the forgiveness of King Antigono, and the opera seria ends happily.

== Characters ==
- Antigono (King of Macedonia) – tenor
- Berenice (Egyptian Princess) – soprano castrato travesti
- Demetrio (Son of Antigono) – soprano castrato
- Ismene (Daughter of Antigono) – soprano castrato travesti
- Alessandro (Enemy of Macedonia) – soprano castrato
- Clearco (Officer to Alessandro) – contralto castrato

== Productions ==
Ensemble Serse gave the modern day premiere of Antigono on 25 April 2015 in an uncut edition performed on period instruments. The cast was:

Antigono – Simon Gfeller (tenor); Berenice – Calvin Wells (male soprano); Demetrio – Milena Dobrzycka (soprano); Alessandro – Michael Taylor (counter-tenor); Ismene – Jorg Delfos (counter-tenor); Clearco – Tom Verney (counter-tenor)

Musical director – Greg Batsleer
