= Max Loppert =

South African critic (1946-2026)

- Born: August 14, 1946; Johannesburg, South Africa
- Died: April 19, 2026 (aged 79); Pieve di Soligo, Italy
- Education: University of the Witwatersrand
- Occupation: Critic
- Spouse: Susan Loppert

Max Loppert (August 14, 1946 - April 19, 2026) was a South African critic of classical music and opera.

== Biography ==
Loppert studied English and Classics at the University of Witwatersrand, and then undertook postgraduate research in Perugia, followed by a degree in music at the University of York. He began writing reviews for the Financial Times in 1976, and was its chief music critic from 1980 to 1996. He also wrote reviews for Opera magazine.

Later in life, Loppert was a Fellow in the School of Music of KwaZulu-Natal University. He left a book on the life and work of Gluck unfinished at his death.
