= Le cinesi =

1754 opera by Christoph Willibald Gluck

- Opera by Christoph Willibald Gluck
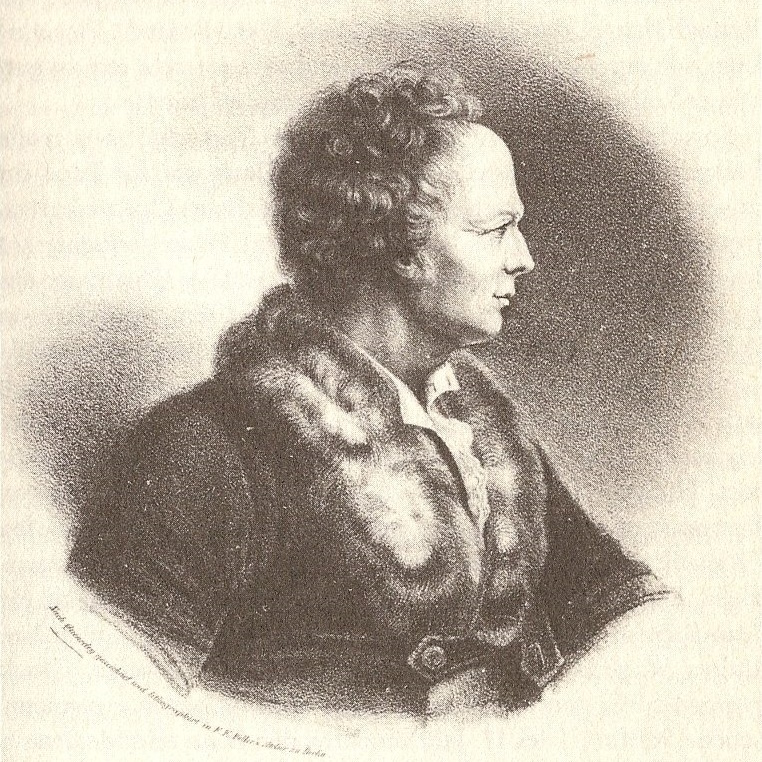
- Portrait of the composer
- Translation: The Chinese Women
- Librettist: Pietro Metastasio
- Language: Italian
- Premiere: 24 September 1754; Schloss Hof, Marchfeld

Le cinesi (The Chinese Women) is an opera in one act, with music composed by Christoph Willibald Gluck. The Italian-language libretto was by Pietro Metastasio, and he described it as a componimento drammatico. This libretto had first been set by Antonio Caldara in 1735. For Gluck's rework, the piece is often considered as an azione teatrale, even though Metastasio and the composer both retained the original designation. The work was first performed for the Austrian royal family at the Schloss Hof on 24 September 1754, on the occasion of the visit of the Empress Maria Theresa to the household of Saxe-Hildburghausen.

Max Loppert has commented on Gluck's relationship with the Austrian royal family and its bearings on this work. The work has also been characterized as a satire on then-contemporary opera conventions.

== Roles ==
Roles, voice types, premiere cast
Role	Voice type	Premiere cast, 24 September 1754
Lisinga	contralto	Vittoria Tesi
Silango	tenor	Joseph Friebert
Sivene	soprano	Theresia Heinisch
Tangia	contralto	Katharina Starzer

== Synopsis ==
The Chinese women of the title are Lisinga and her two friends, Tangia and Sivene. The only other character is Lisinga's brother Silango, who has just returned from Europe. To entertain him, they perform arias in contrasting styles:

- Lisinga sings a tragic scena, as the character of Andromache.
- Sivene and Silango sing a pastoral duet as shepherdess and shepherd, respectively. The two already share romantic feelings towards each other.
- Tangia, who is envious of Silango's affection towards Sivene, sings a comic aria that pokes fun at a young Parisian dandy standing before a mirror, and thus indirectly satirising Sivene.

The characters agree that each style has its drawbacks. The opera concludes with a ballet, The Judgment of Paris, sung as a vocal quartet.

== Recordings ==
- Deutsche Harmonia Mundi EL 16 9575 1: Isabelle Poulenard, Gloria Banditelli, Anne Sofie von Otter, Guy de Mey; Orchestra of the Schola Cantorum Basiliensis; René Jacobs, conductor
- Orpheo Cat: 178891A: Kaaren Erickson, Alexandrina Miltcheva, Marga Schiml, Thomas Moser; Munich Radio Orchestra; Lamberto Gardelli, conductor.
