= La clemenza di Tito (Gluck) =

Opera by Christoph Willibald Gluck

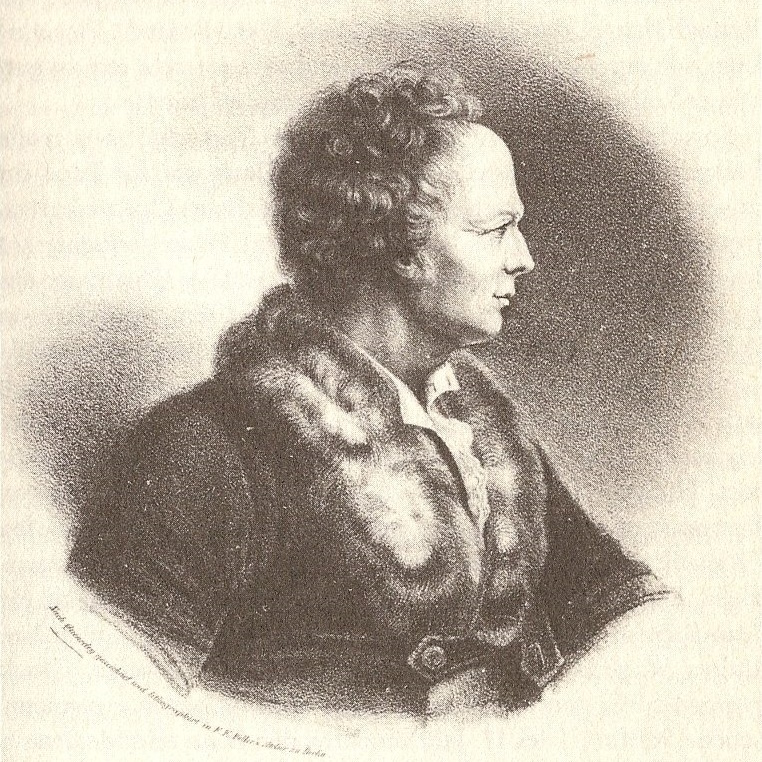
Portrait of Christoph Willibald Gluck, ca. 1750

La clemenza di Tito (The Clemency of Titus) is an opera by the composer Christoph Willibald Gluck. It takes the form of a dramma per musica in three acts. The Italian-language libretto is by Pietro Metastasio. The opera premiered on 4 November 1752 at the Teatro San Carlo in Naples.

== Roles ==
Roles, voice types, premiere cast
Role	Voice type	Premiere cast
Tito, Roman Emperor	tenor	Gaetano Ottani
Vitellia, daughter of the deposed Emperor Vitellio	soprano	Caterina Visconti
Sesto, a young patrician, friend of Tito, in love with Vitellia	soprano castrato	Gaetano Majorano ("Caffarelli")
Annio, a young patrician, friend of Sesto, in love with Servilia	soprano castrato	Emanuele Cornaggia
Servilia, sister of Sesto, in love with Annio	soprano	Maria Masi Giura
Publio, Praetorian prefect, commander of the Praetorian Guard	soprano (en travesti)	Teresa Venturelli ("La Carbonarina")

== Synopsis ==
Note: In typical opera seria fashion, all arias sung in La Clemenza di Tito are followed by the same character's immediate stage exit.

Setting: Rome 79 A.D.

=== Act 1 ===
Scene 1: A room in Vitellia's apartment overlooking the river Tiber

Vitellia, the daughter of deposed Emperor Vitellius, covets the throne of Titus, the son of recently deceased Emperor Vespasian who deposed Vitellia's father. Vitellia is jealous of Berenice, the Judean princess whom Titus has chosen for a wife, and implores Sextus to assassinate Titus in revenge. Sextus is a close friend to Titus but is also madly in love with Vitellia. Annius, a friend of Sextus and Titus, arrives and announces that Titus has sent Berenice away from Rome. Vitellia's hopes rise and she calls off the assassination plot. Sextus begins to complain, but Vitellia demands that he have complete faith in her (Vitellia: "Deh se piacer mi vuoi"). Annius, who is in love with Sextus's sister Servilia, asks Sextus to get approval of his marriage from Titus. Sextus is delighted at the task and eager to tighten bonds with his friend, but Annius expresses an unexplainable fear that he may be denied Servilia's hand (Annius: "Io sento che in petto"). Alone, Sextus contemplates his own love for Vitellia and the cruel power she has over him (Sextus: "Opprimete i contumaci").

Scene 2: The atrium of the Temple of Jupiter Stator with a view of the Roman Forum in the background

Publius, prefect of the Praetorian Guard, awaits the arrival of Titus with an assembly of Roman senators, envoys and members of the Roman public. Titus approaches with Sextus and Annius, preceded by the Praetorian Guard (March). Annius announces the Senate's decision to declare Titus a god and build a temple in his name. Publius presents tributes from the envoys to be used for the project, but Titus requests that the funds instead be redirected to the recent victims of Mount Vesuvius. All depart except Titus, Sextus, and Annius. Alone with his friends, Titus explains his imperative to quickly take a native Roman as his wife and announces his intention to marry Servilia, to the horror of Annius. Sextus begins to object on behalf of Annius, but Annius intercedes and downplays Sextus's objection as mere modesty. Titus requests for Annius to carry the good news to Servilia and magnanimously tells Sextus of his joy in lifting up his friends (Titus: "Del più sublime soglio"). Titus departs with Sextus. Servilia approaches Annius and is told of Titus's desire to marry her. Sevilia is surprised by the news and asks Annius to explain further. Annius only begs Servilia's forgiveness and departs (Annius: "Ah! perdona al primo affetto"). Alone, Servilia vows to do everything in her power to preserve her love with Annius (Servilia: "Amo te solo").

Scene 3: A pleasant room in the imperial palace on Palatine Hill

Publius is telling Titus about citizens who have been heard speaking ill of previous emperors but steps away to give Titus privacy when Servilia enters. Alone with Titus, Servilia reveals her secret love for Annius. Titus is overjoyed at Servilia's honesty and gladly relinquishes her hand to Annius. Titus proclaims that if all his subjects followed her lead, his reign would indeed be nothing but delight (Titus: "Ah! se fosse intorno al trono"). Vitellia, bitter about being passed over yet again, storms into the room to confront Titus, but finds Servilia alone. Vitellia mockingly curtsies to her perceived rival. In revenge, Servilia decides not to reveal that Titus's hand is once again free and departs, leaving Vitellia to stew in her delusion. Sextus appears and Vitellia berates him for failing to assassinate Titus. Vitellia reminds Sextus that she has loved Titus once before and she can love him again. Vitellia continues to goad Sextus to kill the only rival for her hand, as she may yet marry Titus if he lives. Finally, Sextus relents and promises to kill Titus. Vitellia is cold and uncompromising as Sextus departs (Sextus: "Parto; ma tu, ben mio"). Publius appears and announces to Vitellia that Titus has just chosen her as his bride. Vitellia sends Publius out to find Sextus and bring him back to her. Anxious, Vitellia awaits the return of Sextus (Vitellia: "Quando sarà quel dì").

=== Act 2 ===
Scene 1: Porticos

Sextus, wearing a red ribbon tied to the right shoulder of his cloak to mark himself amongst the conspirators, prepares to take action but falters in shame. He decides to stop Lentulus, the leader of the conspirators, but, seeing the Capitol already in flames, realizes that the plan has already been set into motion and cannot be stopped. Annius arrives as Sextus begins to hurry away and Annius asks where he is going. Sextus tells Annius that he will learn his destination soon enough and flees. Annius decides to follow but is apprehended by Servilia and Publius. Publius informs him that Rome is in uproar. Annius charges Publius to protect Servilia and departs to investigate. Publius tells Servilia to return to her quarters, for Titus has already assigned guards to protect both her and Vitellia. Servilia asks how Titus found time to think of her safety during the uproar. Publius replies that Titus watches all and is never caught by surprise (Publius: "Sia lontano ogni cimento"). Alone, Servilia worries for Annius's safety, then departs (Servilia: "Almen se non poss'io"). Vitellia appears, searching for Sextus, and apprehends him as he absent-mindedly stumbles past. Sextus tells her the deed is done: Titus is slain. Vitellia berates Sextus as a traitor and a fool, vacillating in her hatred towards Sextus and herself (Vitellia: "Come potesti, oh Dio!"). Annius appears, informing Sextus that Titus lives. Sextus is dumbfounded and tells Annius that he witnessed Titus's death with his own eyes. Annius tells Sextus to go see Titus for himself, but Sextus refuses and confesses his betrayal. Sextus tells Annius to protect Titus from further attacks but insists he must flee Rome. Annius advises him to stay and risk his chances rather than confirm his guilt through flight. Sextus is finally convinced to go to Titus, but he needs to dispose of his bloodstained cloak first. They quickly swap cloaks before Sextus departs still lost in confusion (Sextus: "Fra stupido e pensoso").

Scene 2: A terrestrial gallery adorned with statues, opening onto gardens

Servilia informs Titus that one of the conspirators came to her and asked her to beg for mercy on his behalf. She continues, explaining that Lentulus was the leader of the conspirators and had disguised himself as Titus, but Lentulus was struck down by one of his own men thinking him to be the true Titus. Titus asks if Lentulus died in the attack. Servilia says he still lives, but it is unknown if he will survive. She also explains how the conspirators each tied red ribbons to their right shoulders to mark one another. Sextus appears, followed by Vitellia, then Annius. Titus notices the red ribbon tied to the shoulder of Sextus's cloak, which Annius is wearing, and accuses Annius of conspiracy. Annius protests his innocence, yet hides the truth to protect Sextus. Sextus begins to confess; Vitellia stops him. Titus places Annius under arrest, interpreting his evasiveness as guilt, yet nevertheless fears branding him a traitor (Titus: "Tu, infedel, non hai difese"). Annius turns to Servilia for support, but she rebuffs him, saying that she will no longer marry him. Annius next turns to Sextus and begs him to reveal the truth before being led away (Annius: "Ch'io parto reo, lo vedi"). Alone together, Vitellia begs Sextus to flee Rome to save both of their lives. Sextus is about to flee when he is apprehended by Publius, who says Lentulus has survived and revealed Sextus's involvement in the plot. As Sextus is being taken away to be questioned by the Senate, he turns to Vitellia and tells her that if she ever feels a breeze on her cheek, it is the breath of her dying lover (Sextus: "Se mai senti spirarti sul volto"). Alone by herself, Vitellia expresses fear that her guilt will soon be revealed to the world (Vitellia: "Tremo fra' dubbi miei").

=== Act 3 ===
Scene 1: An enclosed room with doors, a chair, and a table with writing utensils

Publius reminds Titus that it is time to go to the public games; however, Titus says he cannot leave until he has learned the Senate's decision regarding Sextus. Titus cannot bring himself to believe Sextus a traitor and sends out Publius to bring back the verdict. As Publius leaves, he tells Titus that his own good nature blinds him to the corrupt hearts of men (Publius: "Tardi s'avvede"). Annius enters, now exonerated, followed by Publius with the verdict: Sextus has confessed and the Senate has condemned all conspirators to the lions. Publius gives the decree to Titus, which awaits his signature. Titus sends away Annius and Publius. Annius begs mercy for Sextus before leaving (Annius: "Pietà, signor, di lui"). Alone, Titus decides to hear Sextus speak before signing the death sentence, hoping to learn of some exonerating circumstance like Annius before. He calls back Publius to bring Sextus before him. Sextus enters and Titus sends out Publius with the guards to be alone with him. Titus attempts to learn the motive for his betrayal, but Sextus will only confirm that he is guilty and deserves to die. Frustrated, Titus says that's precisely what he'll get and calls back the guards to take him away. Before leaving, Sextus acknowledges his impending death and expresses regret at his betrayal (Sextus: "Vo disperato a morte"). Titus wrestles with the idea of sentencing Sextus to death. He ultimately decides to follow his own merciful nature and tears up the sentence. He calls back Publius and announces that he has decided Sextus's fate and is ready to go to the arena. Before leaving, Titus acknowledges to himself that if a hard heart is required to be emperor, the gods will have to either give him another heart or take away his empire (Titus: "Se all'impero, amici Dei"). Vitellia arrives and is told by Publius that Sextus has been sentenced to death and Titus has already left for the arena. Before Publius leaves for the arena himself, Vitellia attempts to ascertain what Sextus has revealed to Titus. She becomes convinced that her guilt has been exposed. Servilia and Annius appear, from whom she learns that she is still to become Empress of Rome. Servilia and Annius ask Vitellia to come with them to beg for Sextus's life, but she declines saying that she will come later. Annius leaves. Servilia angrily tells Vitellia that her tears are useless if she won't act, then follows Annius (Servilia: "Se altro che lagrime"). Alone, Vitellia recognizes that she cannot live with herself if she does not attempt to save Sextus and decides to go confess her crimes before Titus. Acknowledging her hopes of marriage to be over, she compares her situation to that of a boatman who must occasionally throw goods overboard to weather a storm (Vitellia: "Getta il nocchier talora").

Scene 2: A grand entrance to a vast amphitheatre, through which arches can be seen inside. The condemned accomplices to the conspiracy can already be seen in the arena, awaiting the wild beasts

The Roman public is assembled to hear Titus's pronouncement. Sextus is brought forth. As Titus is about to read the pardon, Vitellia appears and throws herself at Titus's feet, confessing all. Titus continues and pardons all involved, including Vitellia. Titus tells Vitellia that he can no longer marry her given the circumstances, but tells her to grant her hand instead to Sextus. She consents and there will be a double wedding with Servilia and Annius. All acknowledge the gods for the safety and protection Titus (Chorus: Che del Ciel, che degli Dei").

== Recordings ==
- La clemenza di Tito L'Arte del Mondo, conducted by Werner Ehrhardt (Deutsche Harmonia Mundi, 2014)

== Sources ==
- Holden, Amanda, The Viking Opera Guide (Viking, 1993), p. 372.
- Gluck-Gesamtausgabe. La clemenza di Tito. Institut für Musikwissenschaft, Goethe-Universität
