= Ipermestra (Gluck) =

Opera by Christoph Willibald Gluck

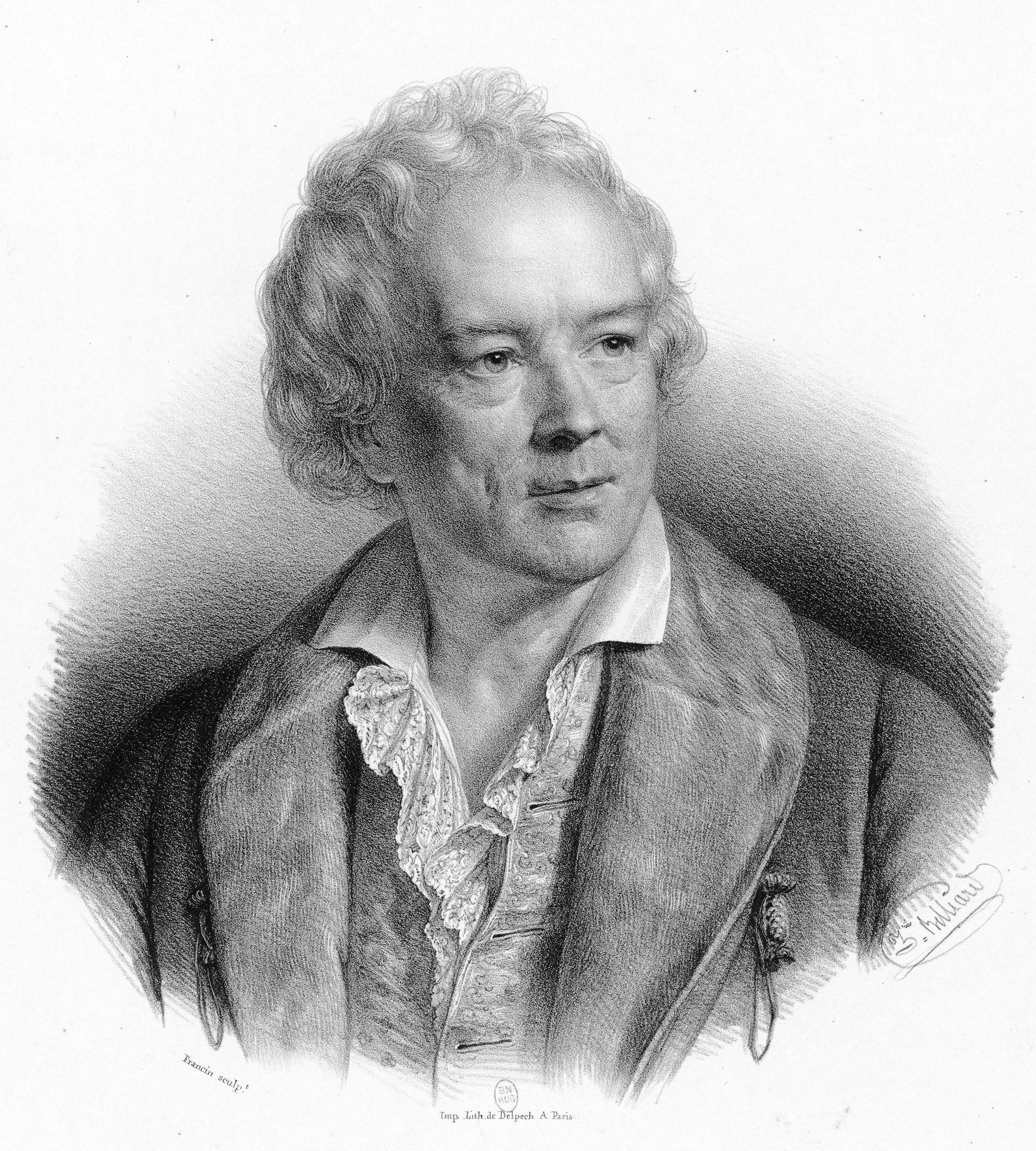
Christoph Willibald Gluck

Ipermestra (Hypermnestra) is an opera by the composer Christoph Willibald Gluck. It takes the form of an opera seria in three acts. The Italian-language libretto is by Pietro Metastasio. The opera premiered on 21 November 1744 at the Teatro San Giovanni Grisostomo in Venice. Ipermestra is the first of Gluck's operas to survive complete.

== Roles ==
Role	Voice type	Premiere cast, 21 November 1744
Danao	tenor	Ottavio Albuzio
Ipermestra	contralto	Vittoria Tesi-Tramontini
Linceo	soprano castrato	Lorenzo Ghirardi
Elpinice	contralto	Girolama Giacometti
Plestene	soprano	Rosalia Andreides
Adrasto	soprano castrato	Giuseppe Perini
