= La danza (Gluck) =

Opera by Christoph Willibald Gluck

La danza (The Dance) is an opera by the composer Christoph Willibald Gluck. The title page describes it as a componimento drammatico pastorale ("dramatic pastoral composition") in one act. It was first performed at Laxenburg near Vienna on 5 May 1755.

== Performance history ==
The opera was written to celebrate the eighth birthday of Empress Maria Theresa's son Leopold and first performed at Laxenburg on 5 May 1755. La danza was used as the prologue to Le grand Ballet des bergers (The Great Ballet of the Shepherds), a ballet with music by Josef Starzer. Pietro Metastasio had originally written the opera's Italian-language libretto for the composer Giuseppe Bonno in 1744. He revised the text for Gluck, including two new arias. The opera may have been reprised on 30 May 1755 at Laxenburg. There is no record of any further performance until 1987, when it appeared at the Teatro Comunale di Bologna.

== Roles ==
Role	Voice type	Premiere cast, 5 May 1755
Nice	soprano	Caterina Gabrielli
Tirsi	tenor	Giuseppe Fribert

== Synopsis ==
As the sun sets, the shepherd Tirsi says farewell to his beloved Nice, who is leaving to take part in a dance. Tirsi reveals he is jealous of Nice's other admirers. The lovers argue but in the end they swear to be true to one another.

== Musical numbers ==
Apart from the opening sinfonia, the score contains five musical numbers:

1. Aria: "Va: della danza è l'ora"
2. Aria: "Se tu non vedi"
3. Aria: "Che ciascun per te sospiri"
4. Aria: "Che chiedi? che brami?"
5. Duet: "Mille volte, mio tesoro"

== Recording ==
- La danza (with La corona) Ewa Ignatowicz (Nice), Kazimierz Myrlak (Tirsi), Warsaw Chamber Orchestra, conducted by Tomasz Bugaj (Orfeo, 1988)
