= La caduta de' giganti =

Opera by Christoph Willibald Gluck

La caduta de' giganti (The Fall of the Giants) is an opera by the composer Christoph Willibald Gluck. It takes the form of a dramma per musica in two acts. The Italian-language libretto is by Francesco Vanneschi. The opera premiered on 7 January 1746 at the King's Theatre, Haymarket in London.

== Sources ==
- Holden, Amanda The Viking Opera Guide (Viking, 1993), page 371.
