= Portrait of Christoph Willibald Gluck =

Painting by Joseph Duplessis

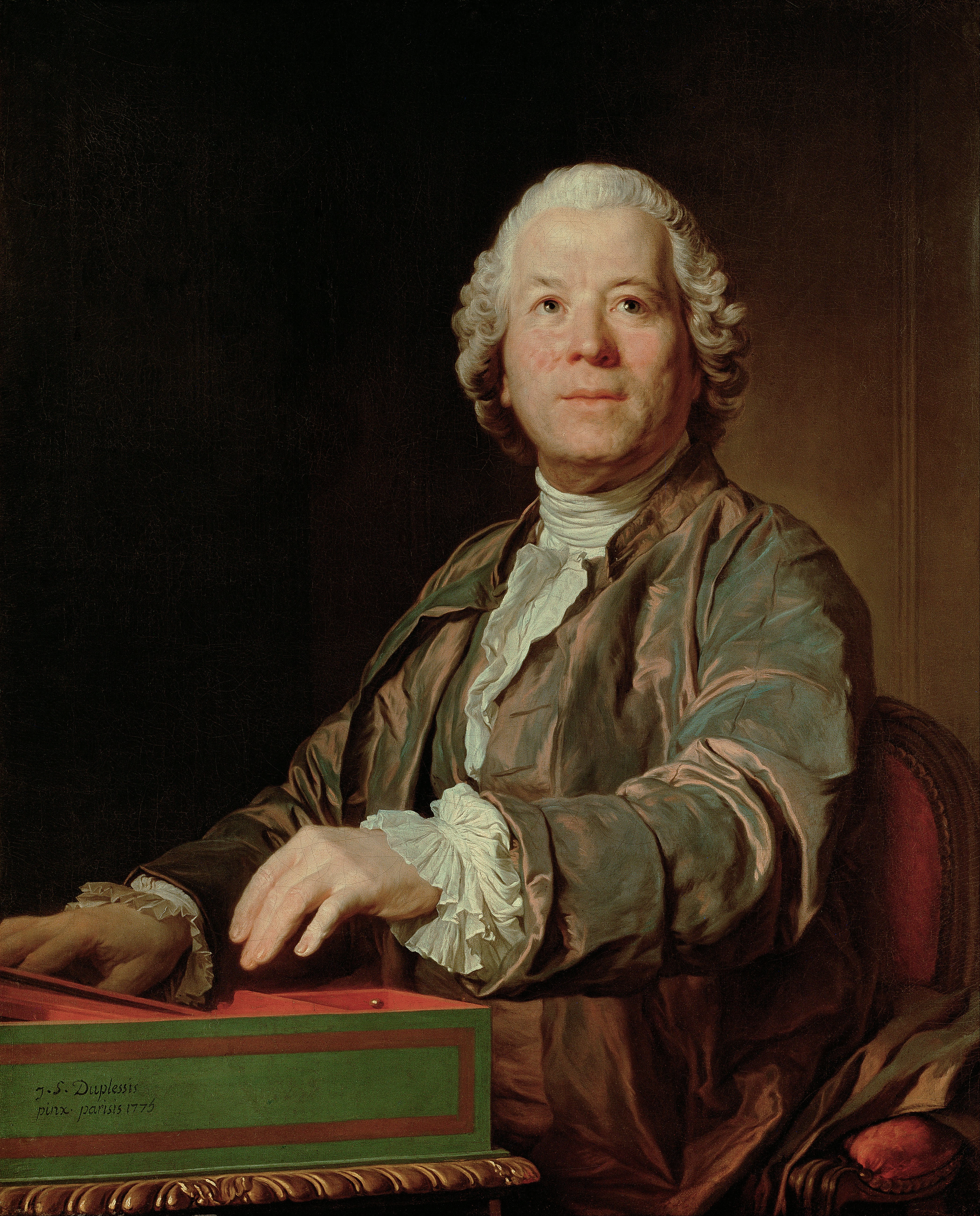
- Artist: Joseph Duplessis
- Year: 1775
- Type: Oil on canvas, portrait painting
- Dimensions: 99.5 cm × 80.5 cm (39.2 in × 31.7 in)
- Location: Kunsthistorisches Museum; Vienna

Portrait of Christoph Willibald Gluck is a 1775 portrait painting by the French artist Joseph Duplessis featuring the composer Christoph Willibald Gluck. It shows him sitting at a spinet.

Celebrated for his operas, Gluck has made his name at the Habsburg court in Vienna. He sat for Duplessis, a fashionable portraitist, during an extended visit to Paris in the mid-1770.

Gluck was particularly pleased with the finished result, which he hung with pride in his house. The painting was exhibited at the Salon of 1775 at the Louvre. A bust of Gluck by Jean-Antoine Houdon was also displayed. The picture is now in the collection of the Kunsthistorisches Museum in Vienna.

== Bibliography ==
- Poulet, Anne L. Jean-Antoine Houdon: Sculptor of the Enlightenment. University of Chicago Press, 2003.
- Prohaska, Wolfgang. Kunsthistorisches Museum, Vienna: The Paintings. Beck, 2004.
- Tolley, Thomas. Painting the Cannon's Roar: Music, the Visual Arts and the Rise of an Attentive Public in the Age of Haydn. Taylor & Francis, 2017.
