= La Semiramide riconosciuta =

Opera by Christoph Willibald Gluck

La Semiramide riconosciuta (Semiramis Revealed) is an opera by the composer Christoph Willibald Gluck. It takes the form of a dramma per musica in three acts. The Italian-language libretto is by Pietro Metastasio. The opera premiered on 14 May 1748 at the Burgtheater in Vienna.

== Sources ==
- Holden, Amanda The Viking Opera Guide (Viking, 1993), page 372.
