= Le nozze d'Ercole e d'Ebe =

Opera by Christoph Willibald Gluck

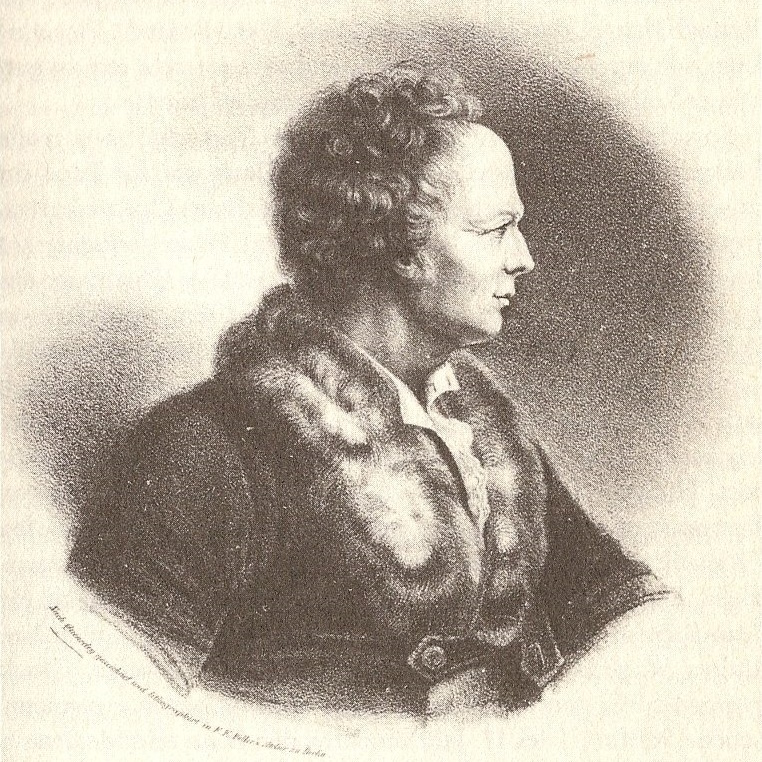
Portrait of Christoph Willibald Gluck, ca. 1750

Le nozze d'Ercole e d'Ebe (The Marriage of Hercules and Hebe) is an opera in two acts composed by Christoph Willibald Gluck to an Italian libretto by an unknown author. Sometimes referred to as a festa teatrale or serenata, it was first performed in Pillnitz near Dresden on 29 June 1747 to celebrate the double wedding of the Bavarian elector and the Saxon crown prince to each other's sisters.

== Roles ==
Role	Voice type	Premiere Cast, 29 June 1747 (Conductor: Christoph Willibald Gluck)
Giove	tenor	Setimio Canini
Ebe	soprano	Giustina Turcotti
Giunone	contralto	Giacinta Forcellini
Ercole	soprano (en travesti)	Regina Mingotti
