= List of Calderón's plays in English translation =

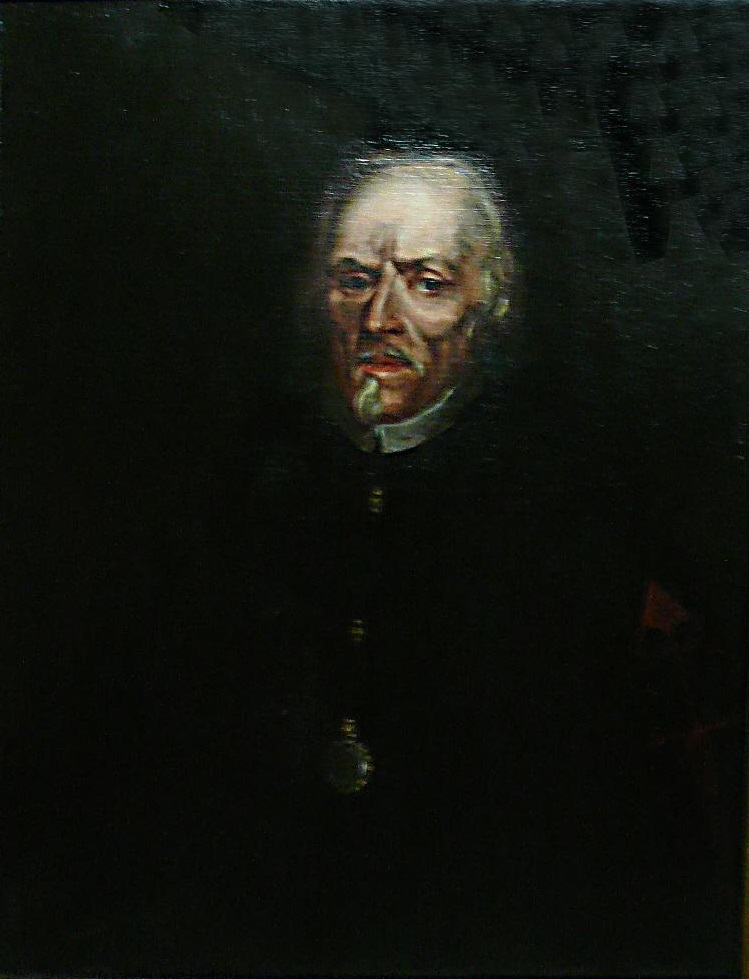
Pedro Calderón de la Barca

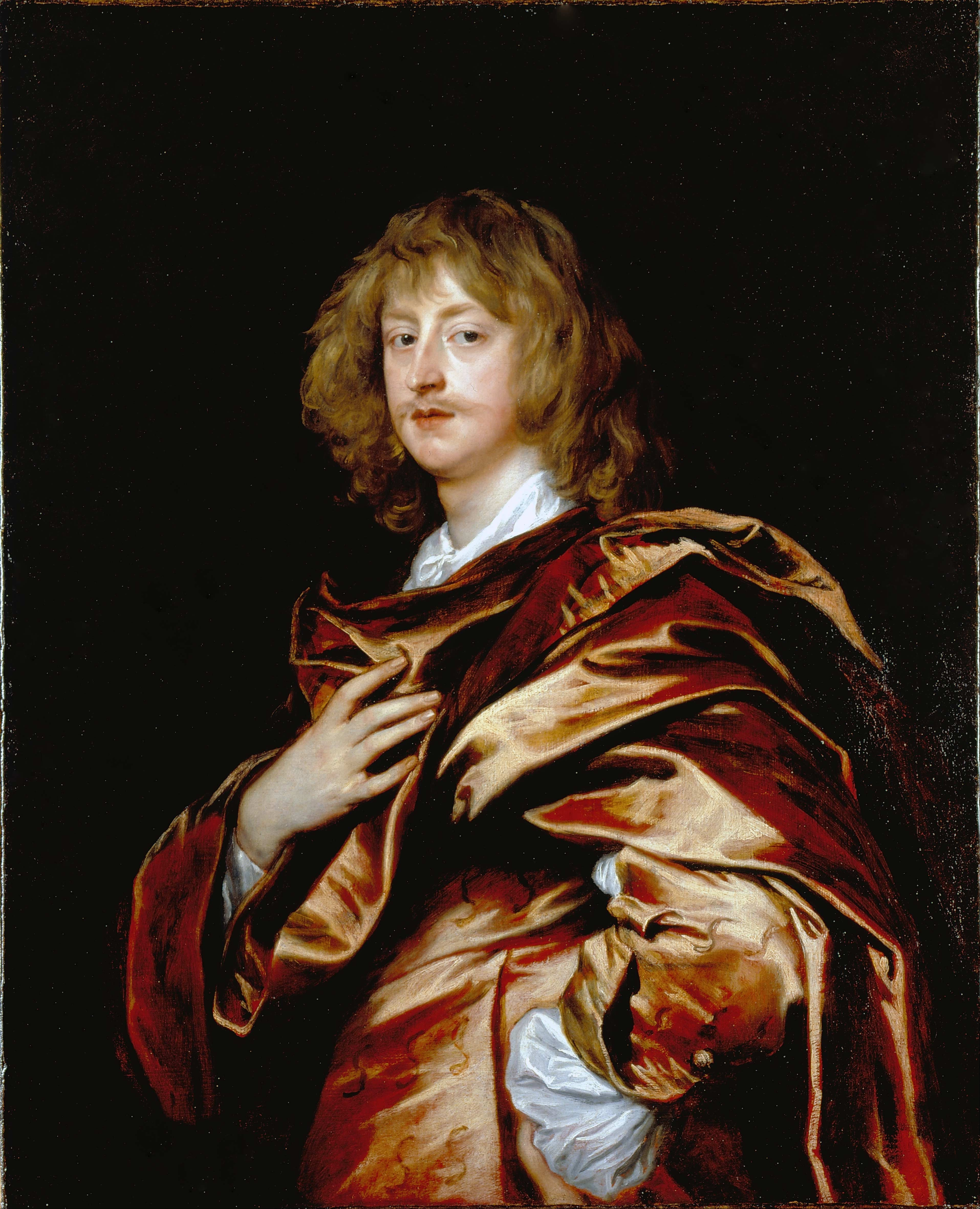
George Digby, 2nd Earl of Bristol

Calderón, Spanish Golden Age playwright; and Digby, his earliest English translator.

Pedro Calderón de la Barca was a Spanish Golden Age playwright who — from the beginning of his theatrical career in the 1620s to his death in 1681 — wrote about 120 comedias and about 80 autos sacramentales. About 40 of these have been translated into English, at least three during Calderón's own lifetime; La vida es sueño (Life is a Dream), "a work many hold to be the supreme example of Spanish Golden Age drama", exists in around 20 English versions.

== Early trends in translation ==
=== 1600s and 1700s: cape and sword ===
Calderón evidently exerted no direct influence on English playwrights before 1660, although one play by John Fletcher and one by Philip Massinger are probably based to some extent on Spanish originals, and James Shirley's The Young Admiral and The Opportunity are adaptations of plays by Calderón's contemporaries Lope de Vega and Tirso de Molina respectively.

The wild success of Sir Samuel Tuke's The Adventures of Five Hours, a 1663 adaptation of a play by Spanish playwright Antonio Coello, began a fashion for Spanish adaptations on the English Restoration stage. Within 4 years, George Digby had translated 3 comedies by Calderón. After this "bubble" based on Calderón's reputation as a popular playwright, his direct influence vanishes almost entirely from the English stage for over a century.

=== 1800s: the Spanish Shakespeare ===
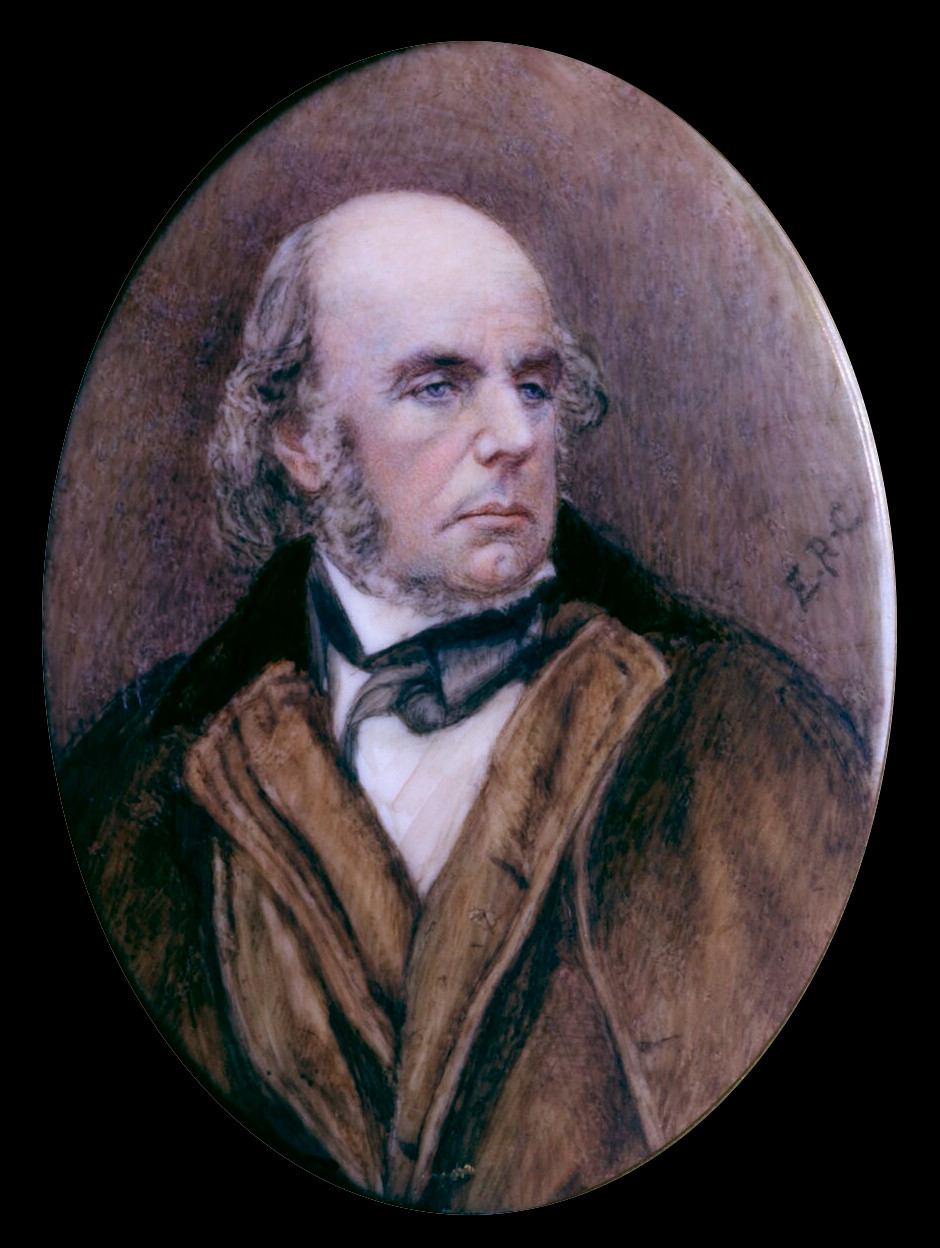
Edward Fitzgerald

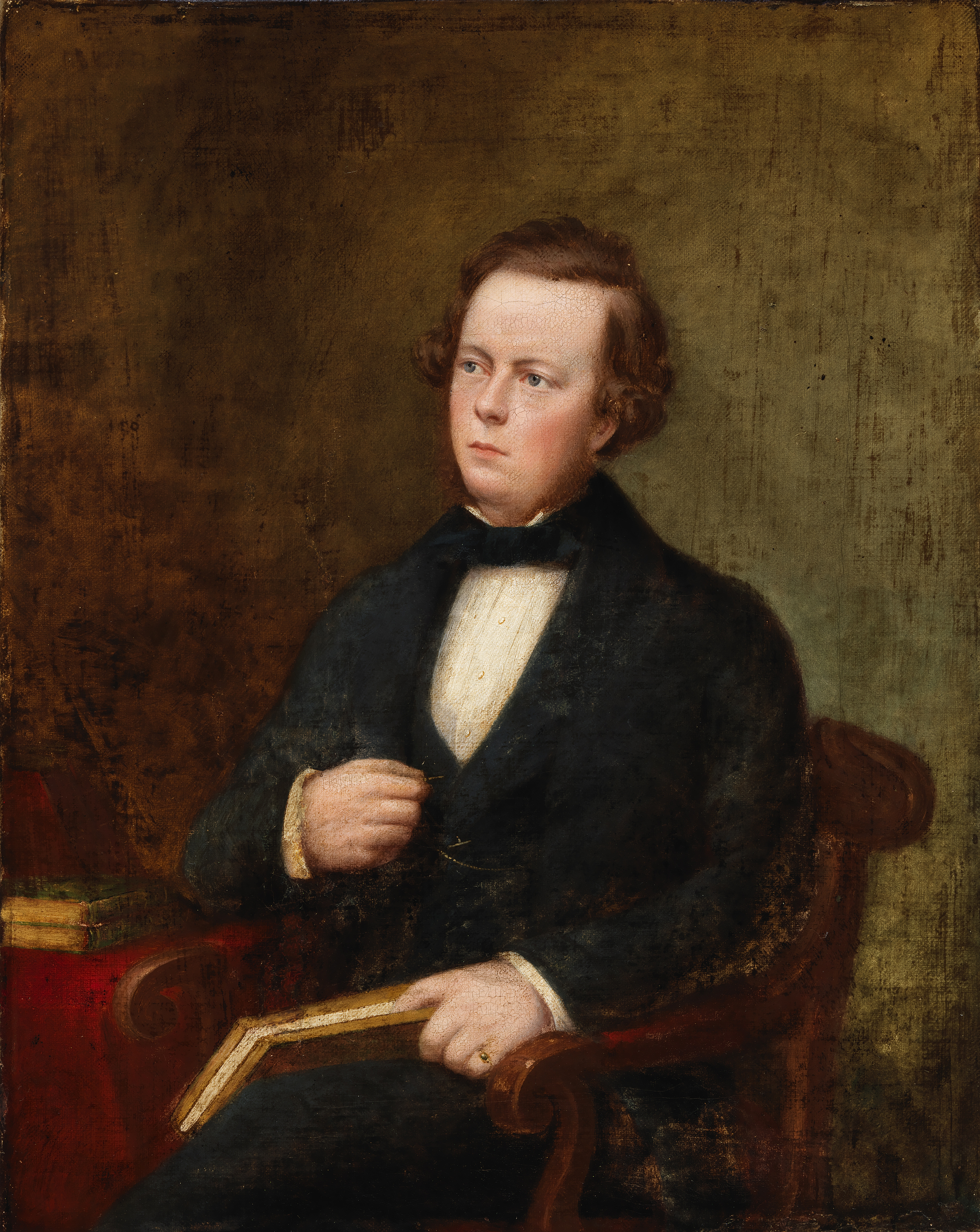
Denis Florence MacCarthy

The two Victorian giants of Calderón translation eyeing each other warily; their approaches could hardly differ more.

At the beginning of the 19th century, international interest in Calderón was resurrected by August Schlegel, and English translation resumed. Now, Calderón was more often seen as a philosophical, literary, or religious — rather than a popular — dramatist. The two giants of 19th-century Calderón translation exhibit opposing approaches to the "Spanish Shakespeare". Edward Fitzgerald, turning Calderón into a pseudo-Elizabethan, states:

I do not believe an exact translation of this poet can be very successful… I have, while faithfully trying to retain what was fine and efficient, sunk, reduced, altered, and replaced, much that seemed not…

Denis Florence MacCarthy exhibiting a more formal "bardolotry" writes:

All the forms of verse have been preserved; while the closeness of the translation may be inferred from the fact, that not only the whole play but every speech and fragment of a speech are represented in English in the exact number of lines of the original, without the sacrifice, it is to be hoped, of one important idea.

It might be said that Fitzgerald's translations were quite English, but not Calderón; while Mac-Carthy's were Calderón, but not quite English.

== Other echoes ==
Besides full translations, Calderón's plays have provided, as it were, raw materials for some English plays (not included in the table below).

Though the ultimate source of John Dryden's An Evening's Love; or, The Mock Astrologer (1668) is Calderón's El Astrologo Fingido, scholars have not determined how much of his writing (if any) is based directly on Calderón, how much on Thomas Corneille's Le Feint Astrologue (a French translation of Calderón's work, which Dryden also acknowledges as a source), and how much on any of several other related French and English sources; whatever the sources, he used them freely, and his entire fifth act is original.

The "high" plot (one of several) in William Wycherley's Love in a Wood (1672) is based on Mañanas de abril y mayo (Mornings of April and May). The basic idea (though not particular scenes) of his Gentleman Dancing-Master (1673) hails from Calderón's El maestro de Danzar. Isaac Bickerstaff writes in 1770 that:

Calderon ... through Molière, Corneille, Le Sage, Boissy, etc. has provided Vanbrugh, Centlivre, Cibber, and Steel [sic], with The Mistake, The False Friend, The Wonder, The Busy Body, The Kind Impostor, The Lady's Philosophy, and The Lying Lover, all English Comedies, which have been received upon the stage with the warmest marks of approbation.

Similarly, John Howard Payne's The Last Duel in Spain (apparently from about 1822-30, and unproduced), although based ultimately on Calderón's El Postrer Duelo de España was probably actually derived from D'Esménard's French prose translation, Le Dernier Duel en Espagne, published in 1822.

== Translations ==
=== Key ===
- Spanish Title — The original comedia or auto that serves as the basis of the English text.
- English Title — The title of the English text, as it appears in the particular translation. Because one Spanish title may suggest alternate English titles (e.g. Life is a Dream, Life's a Dream, Such Stuff as Dreams are Made Of), sorting by this column is not a reliable way to group all translations of a particular original together; to do so, sort on Spanish Title.
- Year — The year of the translation's first publication (except where * indicates "first production"). Some translations were written or produced earlier than this date, and some were republished subsequently, but this is not noted here.
- Publication — The publication in which the translation first appeared. When the publication consisted only of the single named play this information is not repeated, except in cases where the publication title is used as an external link to the work, or when it is matched with an ISBN.
- Notes — May indicate the style of translation or significant republications; "auto" indicates an auto sacramentale; all other works are comedias.

=== Table ===
Spanish Title	English Title	Year	Translator	Publication	Notes
Peor está que estaba	Worse and Worse	1664?*	Digby, George	not extant	blank verse (presumably); performed at the Duke's Theatre between 1662 and 1665
Mejor está que estaba	'Tis Better than It Was	1664?*	Digby, George	not extant	blank verse (presumably); performed at the Duke's Theatre July 1664
No siempre lo peor es cierto	Elvira: or, The Worst is Not Always True	1667	Digby, George	Elvira: or, The worst not always true at the HathiTrust Digital Library, downloadable at Google Books	blank verse; first performed at Lincoln's Inn Fields November 1664; reprinted in Robert Dodsley's Select Collection of Old Plays Vol 12 at the Internet Archive
La Dama Duende	Woman is a Riddle	1718	Bullock, Christopher (& others?)	Woman is a Riddle at the Internet Archive	prose
El escondido y la tapada	'Tis Well It's No Worse	1770	Bickerstaffe, Isaac	'Tis Well It's No Worse at the Internet Archive	prose
Peor está que estaba	From Bad to Worse	1805	Holcroft, Fanny	The Theatrical Recorder Vol 1. No. 4 (1805) at Google Books	prose; the two comedias translated by Holcroft, by chance or by design, correspond to Digby's two lost texts
Mejor está que estaba	Fortune Mends	1805	Holcroft, Fanny	The Theatrical Recorder Vol. 2 No. 8 (1805) at HathiTrust	prose; the two comedias translated by Holcroft, by chance or by design, correspond to Digby's two lost texts
La Dama Duende	The Fairy Lady	1807	Holland, Lord (anonymously)	Three Comedies Translated from the Spanish at the Internet Archive	prose
Nadie fie su secreto	Keep Your Own Secret	1807	Holland, Lord (anonymously)	Three Comedies Translated from the Spanish at the Internet Archive	prose
El Magico Prodigioso	The Wonder-Working Magician (scenes)	1824	Shelley, Percy Bysshe	Posthumous Poems at the Internet Archive	blank verse; major fragments, comprising much of the main plot; reprinted in The Classic Theatre III: Six Spanish Plays, ed. Eric Bentley (1959)
La Vida es Sueño	Life, a Dream	1830	Cowan, Malcolm (anonymously)		
La Vida es Sueño	Life is a Dream	1842	Oxenford, John	The Monthly Magazine (Vol XCVI, p. RA1-PA255, at Google Books: Nos DXLIX, DL, DLI)	blank verse
El Magico Prodigioso	Justina	1848	"J. H." (Mac-Carthy, Denis Florence?)	Justina: a play at the Internet Archive	verse; retranslated as The Wonder-Working Magician in Calderon’s Dramas (1873)
El pintor de su deshonra	The Painter of His Own Dishonor	1853	Fitzgerald, Edward	Six Dramas of Calderon	blank verse and prose, “freely adapted”; reprinted in Eight Dramas of Calderon (1906) at the Internet Archive
Nadie fie su secreto	Keep Your Own Secret	1853	Fitzgerald, Edward	Six Dramas of Calderon	blank verse and prose, “freely adapted”; reprinted in Eight Dramas of Calderon (1906) at the Internet Archive
Luis Pérez, el gallego	Gil Perez, the Gallician	1853	Fitzgerald, Edward	Six Dramas of Calderon	blank verse and prose, “freely adapted”; reprinted in Eight Dramas of Calderon (1906) at the Internet Archive
Las tres justicias en una	Three Judgements at a Blow	1853	Fitzgerald, Edward	Six Dramas of Calderon	blank verse and prose, “freely adapted”; reprinted in Eight Dramas of Calderon (1906) at the Internet Archive
El Alcalde de Zalamea	The Mayor of Zalamea	1853	Fitzgerald, Edward	Six Dramas of Calderon	blank verse and prose, “freely adapted”; reprinted in Eight Dramas of Calderon (1906) at the Internet Archive
Guárdate del agua mansa	Beware of Smooth Water	1853	Fitzgerald, Edward	Six Dramas of Calderon	blank verse and prose, “freely adapted”; reprinted in Eight Dramas of Calderon (1906) at the Internet Archive
El Principe Constant	The Constant Prince	1853	Mac-Carthy, Denis Florence	Dramas of Calderon, Tragic, Comic, and Legendary, Vol 1 at the Internet Archive	imitative verse; reprinted with revisions by Henry W. Wells in Calderon de la Barca: Six Plays (1961)
El Secreto a Voces	The Secret in Words	1853	Mac-Carthy, Denis Florence	Dramas of Calderon, Tragic, Comic, and Legendary, Vol 1 at the Internet Archive	imitative verse
El médico de su honra	The Physician of His Own Honour	1853	Mac-Carthy, Denis Florence	Dramas of Calderon, Tragic, Comic, and Legendary, Vol 1 at the Internet Archive	imitative verse
Amar despues de la Muerte	Love After Death	1853	Mac-Carthy, Denis Florence	Dramas of Calderon, Tragic, Comic, and Legendary, Vol 2 at the Internet Archive	imitative verse; reprinted with revisions by Henry W. Wells in Calderon de la Barca: Six Plays (1961)
El Purgatorio de San Patricio	The Purgatory of St. Patrick	1853	Mac-Carthy, Denis Florence	Dramas of Calderon, Tragic, Comic, and Legendary, Vol 2 at the Internet Archive	imitative verse; revised version published in Calderon’s Dramas (1873)
La Banda y la Flor	The Scarf and the Flower	1853	Mac-Carthy, Denis Florence	Dramas of Calderon, Tragic, Comic, and Legendary, Vol 2 at the Internet Archive	imitative verse
La Vida es Sueño	Life's a Dream (passages)	1856	Trench, Richard Chenevix	Life's a Dream; The Great Theatre of the World at the Internet Archive	not a complete translation, but many significant passages with commentary interspersed
El gran teatro del mundo	The Great Theatre of the World (passages)	1856	Trench, Richard Chenevix	Life's a Dream; The Great Theatre of the World at the Internet Archive	auto; not a complete translation, but many significant passages with commentary interspersed
Los Encantos de la Culpa	The Sorceries of Sin	1859	Mac-Carthy, Denis Florence	The Atlantis: a Register of Literature and Science Vol II at the Internet Archive pp 277–323	auto; imitative verse; bilingual edition; reprinted in Love the Greatest Enchantment, The Sorceries of Sin, The Devotion of the Cross. From the Spanish of Calderon (1861) at the Internet Archive
El Mayor Encanto Amor	Love the Greatest Enchantment	1861	Mac-Carthy, Denis Florence	Love the Greatest Enchantment, The Sorceries of Sin, The Devotion of the Cross. From the Spanish of Calderon at the Internet Archive	imitative verse; bilingual edition
La Devoción de la Cruz	The Devotion of the Cross	1861	Mac-Carthy, Denis Florence	Love the Greatest Enchantment, The Sorceries of Sin, The Devotion of the Cross. From the Spanish of Calderon at the Internet Archive	imitative verse; bilingual edition; reprinted with revisions by Henry W. Wells in Calderon de la Barca: Six Plays (1961)
El Magico Prodigioso	The Mighty Magician	1865	Fitzgerald, Edward	The Mighty Magician; Such Stuff as Dreams are Made Of	blank verse and prose, “freely adapted”; reprinted in Eight Dramas of Calderon (1906) at the Internet Archive
La Vida es Sueño	Such Stuff as Dreams are Made Of	1865	Fitzgerald, Edward	The Mighty Magician; Such Stuff as Dreams are Made Of	blank verse and prose, “freely adapted”; reprinted in Eight Dramas of Calderon (1906) at the Internet Archive
La cena del rey Baltazar	Belshazzar’s Feast	1867	Mac-Carthy, Denis Florence	Mysteries of Corpus Christi at the Internet Archive	auto; imitative verse; reprinted with revisions by Henry W. Wells in Calderon de la Barca: Six Plays (1961)
La Divina Filotéa	The Divine Philothea	1867	Mac-Carthy, Denis Florence	Mysteries of Corpus Christi at the Internet Archive	auto; imitative verse
El Veneno y la Triaca	The Poison and the Antidote (first scene only)	1867	Mac-Carthy, Denis Florence	Mysteries of Corpus Christi at the Internet Archive	auto; imitative verse
Los dos amantes del cielo: Crisanto y Daria	The Two Lovers of Heaven: Chysanthus and Daria	1869	Mac-Carthy, Denis Florence	The Atlantis: a Register of Literature and Science Vol V at the Internet Archive Article II, pp 13–68	imitative verse; reprinted in The Two Lovers of Heaven: Chysanthus and Daria. A drama of early Christian Rome (1870) at the Internet Archive
La Vida es Sueño	Life Is a Dream	1873	Mac-Carthy, Denis Florence	Calderon’s Dramas at the Internet Archive	imitative verse; reprinted with revisions by Henry W. Wells in Calderon de la Barca: Six Plays (1961)
El Magico Prodigioso	The Wonder-Working Magician	1873	Mac-Carthy, Denis Florence	Calderon’s Dramas at the Internet Archive	imitative verse; reprinted with revisions by Henry W. Wells in Calderon de la Barca: Six Plays (1961)
El Purgatorio de San Patricio	The Purgatory of St. Patrick (revised)	1873	Mac-Carthy, Denis Florence	Calderon’s Dramas at the Internet Archive	imitative verse
El Alcalde de Zalamea	Nobility; or The Alcalde of Zalamea	1885	Pierra, Adolfo		
El gran príncipe de Fez	The Prince of Fez	1905	Kaenders, Peter	The prince of Fez; a drama in three acts, adapted from Don Calderon de la Barca	
La Vida es Sueño	Life’s a Dream	1925	Birch, Frank & J. B. Trend		stage version, prose and verse
La cena del rey Baltazar	The Feast of Belshazzar	1934	Jones, Willis Knapp	Spanish one act plays in English : a comprehensive anthology of Spanish drama from the 12th century to the present	auto
El desafío de Juan Rana	Juan Rana's Duel	1934	Jones, Willis Knapp	Spanish one act plays in English : a comprehensive anthology of Spanish drama from the 12th century to the present	
El gran teatro del mundo	The Great World-Theatre	1955	Sipman, Francis E.		auto
El gran teatro del mundo	The Great Theatre of the World	1957	Graves, John Clarus	The Great Theatre of the World; based on a theme from Calderon	auto
El gran teatro del mundo	The Great Theatre of the World	1957	Singleton, Mack Hendricks	Masterpieces of the Spanish Golden Age, ed. Angel Flores	auto
La Vida es Sueño	Life is a Dream	1958	Colford, William E		
El gran teatro del mundo	The Great Theatre of the World	1958	Graves, Clarus J. & Cuthbert G. Soukup	The Great Theatre of the World: [A Morality Play] Based on a Theme from Calderón	auto
Amar despues de la Muerte	Love After Death	1959	Campbell, Roy	The Classic Theatre III: Six Spanish Plays, ed. Eric Bentley	blank verse
La Vida es Sueño	Life is a Dream	1959	Campbell, Roy	The Classic Theatre III: Six Spanish Plays, ed. Eric Bentley	blank verse; reprinted in Life Is A Dream and Other Spanish Classics, ed. Eric Bentley (1985)
El Alcalde de Zalamea	The Mayor of Zalamea	1959	Colford, William E		
El médico de su honra	The Surgeon of His Honour	1960	Campbell, Roy		blank verse; acting edition
A Secreto Agravio, Secreta Venganza	Secret Vengeance for Secret Insult	1961	Honig, Edwin	Calderon: Four Plays	loose syllabic verse; reprinted in Calderón de la Barca: Six Plays (1993) ISBN 1-882763-05-X
La Devoción de la Cruz	Devotion to the Cross	1961	Honig, Edwin	Calderon: Four Plays	loose syllabic verse; reprinted in Calderón de la Barca: Six Plays (1993) ISBN 1-882763-05-X
El Alcalde de Zalamea	The Mayor of Zalamea	1961	Honig, Edwin	Calderon: Four Plays	loose syllabic verse; reprinted in Calderón de la Barca: Six Plays (1993) ISBN 1-882763-05-X
La Dama Duende	The Phantom Lady	1961	Honig, Edwin	Calderon: Four Plays	loose syllabic verse; reprinted in Calderón de la Barca: Six Plays (1993) ISBN 1-882763-05-X
La Vida es Sueño	Life Is a Dream	1962	Huberman, Edward & Elizabeth	Spanish Drama, ed. Angel Flores	prose; reprinted as Great Spanish Plays in English Translation (1991) ISBN 0-486-26898-5
La Vida es Sueño	Life is a Dream	1963	Alpern, Hymen	Three Classic Spanish Plays	
El gran teatro del mundo	The Great Stage of the World	1964	Brandt, George W.	The Great Stage of the World: An Allegorical Auto Sacramental in Three Acts/Gran teatro del mundo	auto
El Alcalde de Zalamea	The Mayor of Zalamea	1964	Starkie, Walter	Eight Spanish Plays of the Golden Age	prose, with passages of blank verse
La Vida es Sueño	Life is a Dream	1968	Raine, Kathleen & R. M. Nadal	Life is a Dream ISBN 978-0241015490	verse
La cena del rey Baltazar	King Belshazzar's Feast	1969	Barnes, R. G.	Three Spanish Sacramental Plays ISBN 978-0951440308	auto
La Vida es Sueño	Life is a Dream	1970	Honig, Edwin	Life is a Dream ISBN 0-8090-6556-8	loose syllabic verse; reprinted in Calderón de la Barca: Six Plays (1993) ISBN 1-882763-05-X
El astrólogo fingido	The Fake Astrologer	1976	Oppenheimer, Max, Jr.	The Fake Astrologer ISBN 978-0820421667	reprinted in Pedro Calderón de la Barca's The Fake Astrologer: A Critical Spanish Text and English Translation (1994)
Peor está que estaba	From Bad to Worse	1980	Muir, Kenneth	Four Comedies by Pedro Calderón de la Barca ISBN 0-8131-1409-8	blank verse and prose
El secreto a voces	The Secret Spoken Aloud	1980	Muir, Kenneth	Four Comedies by Pedro Calderón de la Barca ISBN 0-8131-1409-8	blank verse and prose
No siempre lo peor es cierto	The Worst is not Always Certain	1980	Muir, Kenneth	Four Comedies by Pedro Calderón de la Barca ISBN 0-8131-1409-8	blank verse and prose
Dicha y desdicha del nombre	The Advantages and Disadvantages of a Name	1980	Muir, Kenneth	Four Comedies by Pedro Calderón de la Barca ISBN 0-8131-1409-8	blank verse and prose
El Magico Prodigioso	The Prodigious Magician	1982	Wardropper, Bruce W.	The Prodigious Magician ISBN 978-8473171113	prose; bilingual edition
Guárdate del agua mansa	Beware of Still Waters	1984	Gitlitz, David M.	Beware of Still Waters ISBN 978-0939980048	bilingual edition
Casa con dos puertas mala es de guardar	A House With Two Doors Is Difficult to Guard	1985	Muir, Kenneth & Ann L. Mackenzie	Calderón: Three Comedies ISBN 0-8131-1546-9	blank verse and prose
Mañanas de abril y mayo	Mornings of April and May	1985	Muir, Kenneth & Ann L. Mackenzie	Calderón: Three Comedies ISBN 0-8131-1546-9	blank verse and prose
No hay burlas con el amor	No Trifling With Love	1985	Muir, Kenneth & Ann L. Mackenzie	Calderón: Three Comedies ISBN 0-8131-1546-9	blank verse and prose
No hay burlas con el amor	Love is no laughing matter	1986	Cruickshank, Don & Sean Page	Love is no laughing matter ISBN 978-0856683664	
El pintor de su deshonra	The Painter of His Dishonour	1989	Paterson, A. K. G.	The Painter of His Dishonour ISBN 978-0856683466	
El Alcalde de Zalamea	The Mayor of Zalamea	1990	Mitchell, Adrian	Three Plays ISBN 978-0948230264	verse, from literal translations by Gwenda Pandolfi
El gran teatro del mundo	The Great Theatre of the World	1990	Mitchell, Adrian	Three Plays ISBN 978-0948230264	auto; verse, from literal translations by Gwenda Pandolfi
La Vida es Sueño	Life’s a Dream	1990	Mitchell, Adrian & John Barton	Three Plays ISBN 978-0948230264	verse, from literal translations by Gwenda Pandolfi
La cisma de Inglaterra	The Schism in England	1990	Muir, Kenneth & Ann L. Mackenzie	The Schism in England ISBN 0-85668-331-0	blank verse; bilingual edition
El médico de su honra	The Surgeon of Honour	1991	Edwards, Gwynne	Calderón: Plays: One ISBN 978-0413634603	
La Vida es Sueño	Life is a dream	1991	Edwards, Gwynne	Calderón: Plays: One ISBN 978-0413634603	
Las tres justicias en una	Three Judgments in One	1991	Edwards, Gwynne	Calderón: Plays: One ISBN 978-0413634603	
El pintor de su deshonra	The Painter of His Own Dishonor	1991	Paterson, A. K. G.	The Painter of His Own Dishonor ISBN 9780856683473	bilingual edition
Los Cabellos de Absalón	The Crown of Absalom	1993	Honig, Edwin	Calderón de la Barca: Six Plays ISBN 1-882763-05-X	loose syllabic verse
El pintor de su deshonra	The Painter of Dishonour	1995	Johnston, David & Laurence Boswell	The Painter of Dishonour ISBN 978-0948230882	
El médico de su honra	The Physician of His Honour	1997	Hindley, Donald	The Physician of His Honour ISBN 9780856687778	bilingual edition; revised translation published in 2007
La Vida es Sueño	Life is a Dream	1998	Clifford, John		
Sueños hay que verdad son	Sometimes Dreams Come True	1998	McGaha, Michael	The Story of Joseph in Spanish Golden Age Drama ISBN 978-0838753804	auto
La vida es sueño	Life Is a Dream	2002	Applebaum, Stanley	Life Is a Dream ISBN 978-0486421247	
La Dama Duende	The Phantom Lady	2002	Beecher, Donald & Novoa, James Nelson	The Phantom Lady at the Internet Archive, ISBN 978-1895537680	prose
La Vida es Sueño	Life's a Dream	2004	Kidd, Michael	Life's a Dream ISBN 9780856688966	
La Vida es Sueño	Life is a Dream	2006	Racz, Gregary J.	Life is a Dream ISBN 978-0-14-310482-7	imitative verse; reprinted in The Golden Age of Spanish Drama (2018) ISBN 978-0393923629
La Vida es Sueño	Life's a Dream	2008	Davis, Rick	Calderón De La Barca, Four Great Plays of the Golden Age ISBN 978-1575255965	
La Dama Duende	The Phantom Lady	2008	Davis, Rick	Calderón De La Barca, Four Great Plays of the Golden Age ISBN 978-1575255965	
El Príncipe Constante	The Constant Prince	2008	Davis, Rick	Calderón De La Barca, Four Great Plays of the Golden Age ISBN 978-1575255965	
El gran teatro del mundo	The Great Theatre of the World	2008	Davis, Rick	Calderón De La Barca, Four Great Plays of the Golden Age ISBN 978-1575255965	auto
La vida es sueño	Life Is a Dream	2009	Cruz, Nilo	Life is a Dream ISBN 978-0822222347	acting edition
La Vida es Sueño	Life is a Dream	2010	Edmundson, Helen	Life is a Dream ISBN 978-1848420601	
No hay burlas con el amor	The Phoenix of Madrid	2012	Boswell, Laurence	The Phoenix of Madrid ISBN 978-1849431347	
El mayor monstruo los celos	Jealousy the Greatest Monster	2014	Muir, Kenneth & Ann L. Mackenzie & José María Ruano de la Haza	Jealousy the Greatest Monster ISBN 9780856683695	bilingual edition
