= The Great Theater of the World =

Play by Pedro Calderón de la Barca

The Great Theater of the World (El Gran Teatro del Mundo) is a c. 1634 play from Spanish writer Pedro Calderón de la Barca (17 January 1600 – 25 May 1681). The play is an allegorical explanation of man's place in world according to the Catholic Church doctrine.

In the play there is an Author (God) who writes the actual Play that is the world; humans are given characters according to the Author’s will: the King who has the power, the poor who suffers, the rich who enjoys very much his stay in the Play, etc., etc. These characters are just playing their roles in this “Play” that is the world and is just a test. Those who do a good performance of their characters will be rewarded by the Author at the end of the (brief, short, and fast) Play while those who do a bad performance will receive their just punishment.

The play is a depiction of the Catholic Church’s doctrine on how humans are on Earth just for a brief and fast test while the real (and eternal) existence is the one that begins with death as in the afterlife. Calderón uses again this doctrinal and philosophical concept of human existence in the world in his more famous play, Life Is a Dream.

This concept of human existence is today’s official Catholic doctrine and an argument against God’s nonexistence due to the suffering and evil present in the world. This doctrine states that only God and the afterlife are the source of absolute justice as they are the only guarantee that evil but powerful and rich people will receive just punishment and good but poor/ill people who suffer on Earth will receive just reward.
