= El Pintor (disambiguation) =

El Pintor is a 2014 album by Interpol.

El Pintor may also refer to:

- El pintor de su deshonra, a 1640s play by Pedro Calderón de la Barca
- "El Pintor", a 1994 song by Hometown Boys
- El Pintor, the pseudonym under which Galinka Ehrenfest wrote.
