= The Phantom Lady =

The Phantom Lady (Spanish: La dama duende) is a play by Spanish playwright Pedro Calderón de la Barca. It was written and performed in 1629 and was published for the first time in the Primera parte de comedias de don Pedro Calderón de la Barca (1636).

The Phantom Lady is a cloak and dagger play (de capa y espada) which follows the plot of the Invisible Mistress. This plot derives from the myth of Cupid and Psyche, but inverts the role of the protagonists. In the plot and in the Spanish play, it is the man's curiosity which leads him to meet and fall in love with the invisible woman; that is, with a woman who is either hidden, veiled or encountered in the dark. The Invisible Mistress plot is already found in Italian novelle by Masuccio Salernitano and Matteo Bandello. Even though Calderón uses elements from Lope de Vega's play La viuda valenciana, his main model is an interpolated story in El soldado Píndaro by Gonzalo de Céspedes y Meneses (1626). As is common in cloak and sword plays, it is the woman, in this case Doña Ángela, who propels the action. Her objective is to conquer Don Manuel while avoiding the attention of her two brothers, who watch over her. In order to communicate with Don Manuel, the lady uses an ingenious device, which creates an ambiance of supernatural mystery, thus referring to the title of the play.

== List of characters ==
- Don Manuel
- Don Juan, his friend
- Don Luis, brother of Don Juan
- Cosme, clownish servant to Don Manuel
- Rodrigo, servant to Don Luis
- Doña Angela, sister of Don Juan and Don Luis
- Doña Beatriz, her cousin
- Isabel, maid to Doña Angela
- Clara, maid to Doña Beatriz

== Plot ==
=== Act 1 ===
The play opens on a street in Madrid on which Don Manuel and his servant, Cosme are traveling to celebrate the christening of a prince.

== Analysis ==
This play had been interpreted from many points of view. One of them emphasized the tragic elements in the work. Those who propose this type of approach point to the tragic references in the first scene; to the darkness that surrounds the spaces in this work; to the fact that Doña Ángela constantly complains that her brothers have incarcerated her; and to the rivalry between the two brothers. Some scholars have studied the magical and the so-called superstitious elements of the play; others have turned to the economic and political subtexts, claiming that gold turned into coal points to the economic policies of the Count-Duke of Olivares. Finally, many have studied the feminist or proto-feminist aspects of the work.

== Adaptations ==
It was adapted into a 1945 Argentinian film The Phantom Lady (1945).

== See also ==
- List of Calderón's plays in English translation
