= El pintor de su deshonra =

El pintor de su deshonra ("The Painter of His Dishonor"), sometimes known as El pintor ("The Painter"), is a 1640s play of the Spanish Golden Age theatre by Pedro Calderón de la Barca. It is one of the author's three famous wife-murder plays, along with A secreto agravio, secreta venganza ("Secret Vengeance for Secret Insult") and El médico de su honra ("The Physician of His Honor"), where private revenge of an aggrieved husband, in this case a painter by the name of Juan Roca, ultimately becomes very public.

This play departs from the other two honor tragedies in its concern with art. Here, Juan Roca is a solitary artist who decides to take a young bride. He can never truly depict her in paint, since he feels he cannot grasp her soul. During the carnival, wanting to flee the noise and revelry, he tells his wife to dance with a masked man who turns out to be Don Álvaro, her former lover who was thought to have drowned. During a fire, Don Álvaro abducts Serafina and although she never surrenders to his advances, she is believed to be guilty by Juan Roca, her husband, after he finds her. He had been sent to secretly paint this unknown woman. His commission was to paint a mythological subject, Hercules, jealous of the abducted Deianira. In killing Serafina, the melancholy Juan Roca becomes the painter of his dishonor. Much of the criticism on this play centers on questions of art. The play has also been studied in terms of the tragic and the political. Its setting in Barcelona and the uses of the poetry of Juan Boscán has led some to see it as an homage to the Catalan poet.

It has been translated into English several times, notably (and freely) by Edward FitzGerald and more recently by Alan K. G. Paterson.
