= Pedro Calderón de la Barca =

Spanish playwright and poet (1600–1681)

Don Pedro Calderón de la Barca
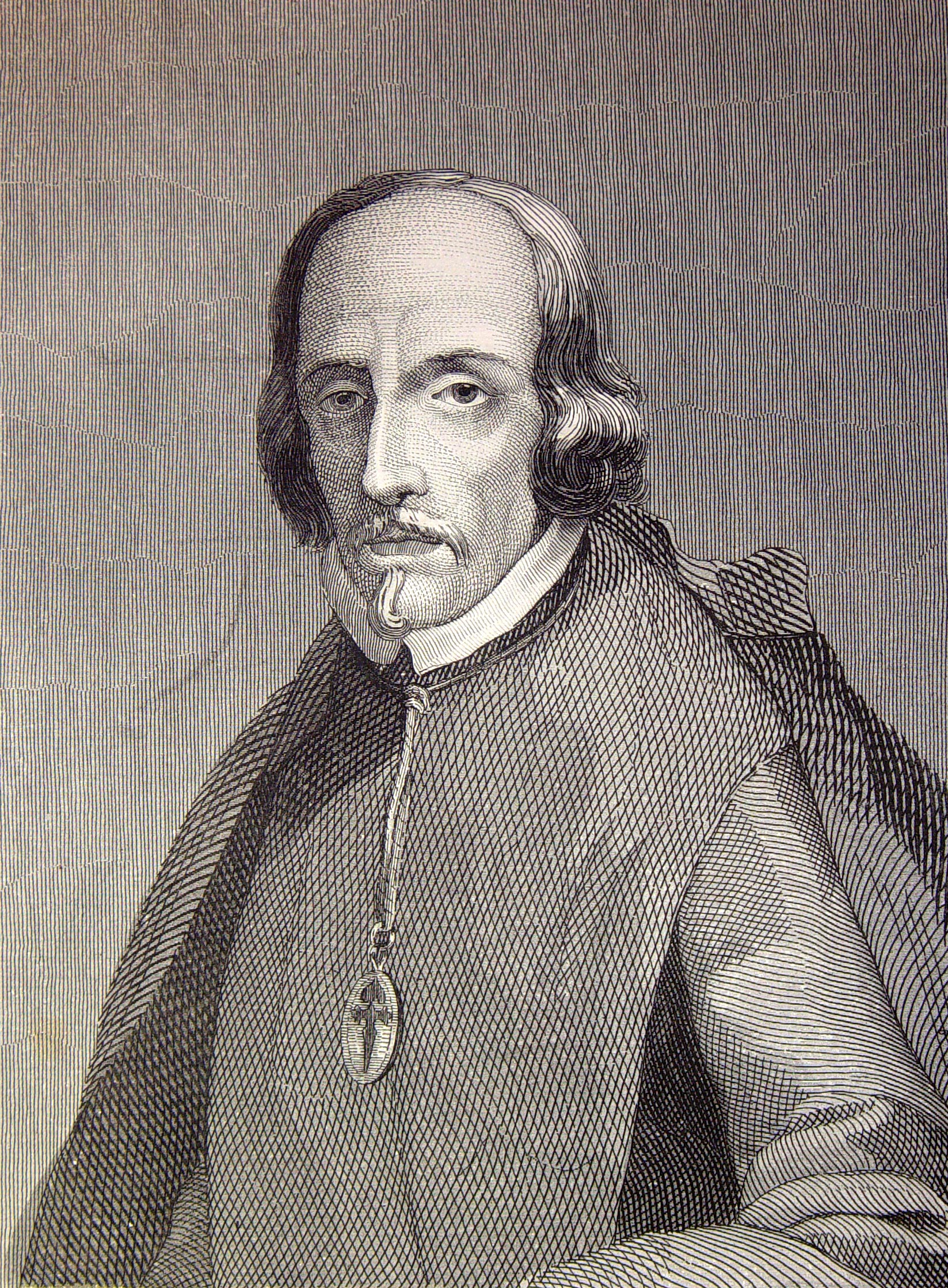
- Born: Pedro Calderón de la Barca y Henao; 17 January 1600; Madrid, Spain
- Died: 25 May 1681 (aged 81); Madrid, Spain
- Education: Colegio Imperial de Madrid; University of Salamanca
- Occupations: Playwright, poet, writer
- Children: Pedro José
- Relatives: Diego Calderón (father); Ana María de Henao (mother)
- Writing career
- Movement: Spanish Golden Age

Pedro Calderón de la Barca y Henao (UK: /ˌkældəˈrɒn ˌdeɪ læ ˈbɑːrkə/, US: /ˌkɑːldəˈroʊn ˌdeɪ lə -, - ˌdɛ lə -/; Spanish: [ˈpeðɾo kaldeˈɾon de la ˈβaɾka]; 17 January 1600 – 25 May 1681) was a Spanish dramatist, poet, and writer. He is known as one of the most distinguished poets and writers of the Spanish Golden Age, especially for the many verse dramas he wrote for the theatre. Calderón has been termed "the Spanish Shakespeare", the national poet of Spain, and one of the greatest poets and playwrights in the history of world literature. (Note: Goethe regarded Calderón as high as Shakespeare, even commenting his plays to be of greater structural-perfection than those of the Bard due to Calderón mending them once and again.)

Calderón de la Barca was born into the minor Spanish nobility in Madrid, where he lived for most of his life. He served as soldier and a knight of the military and religious Order of Santiago, but later became a Roman Catholic priest. His theatrical debut was a history play about the life of King Edward III of England; it was first performed on 29 June 1623 at the Royal Alcázar of Madrid, during the surprise visit to Spain of Charles, Prince of Wales to negotiate for a dynastic marriage alliance with the Spanish Habsburgs.

As he continued writing verse dramas, Calderón's favorite theatrical genres included mystery plays illustrating the doctrines of Transubstantiation and the Real Presence for performance during the Feast of Corpus Christi and both comedy of intrigue and tragic theatre rooted in many of the same plot devices as Shakespeare's plays and in ethical dilemmas under the Spanish nobility's code of honour. Born while the unwritten rules of Spanish Golden Age theatre were still being defined by Lope de Vega, Calderón pushed their limits even further by introducing radical and pioneering innovations that are now termed metafiction and surrealism.

His masterpiece, La Vida es Sueño ("Life is a Dream"), combines a beauty and the beast plotline, a disguised woman reminiscent of Viola from Shakespeare's Twelfth Night, surrealist concepts, romantic complications, and the threat of a dynastic civil war, while exploring the philosophical question of whether each individual's fate has already been written without their involvement or if the future can be altered by free will.

Calderón's poetry and plays have since wielded an enormous global influence upon Romanticism, symbolism, literary modernism, expressionism, dystopian science fiction, and even postmodernism. His many admirers have included August Wilhelm Schlegel, Johann Wolfgang von Goethe, John Dryden, Lord Byron, Percy Bysshe Shelley, Fr. Félix Sardà y Salvany, Hugo von Hoffmannsthal, Vyacheslav Ivanov, Jorge Luis Borges, Konstantin Stanislavsky, and Boris Pasternak.

In 1881, the Royal Spanish Academy awarded a gold medal to Irish poet Denis Florence MacCarthy for his highly praised and accurate literary translations of Calderón's verse dramas into English. In 2021, a renewed search for Calderón's missing remains gained media attention worldwide.

== Biography ==
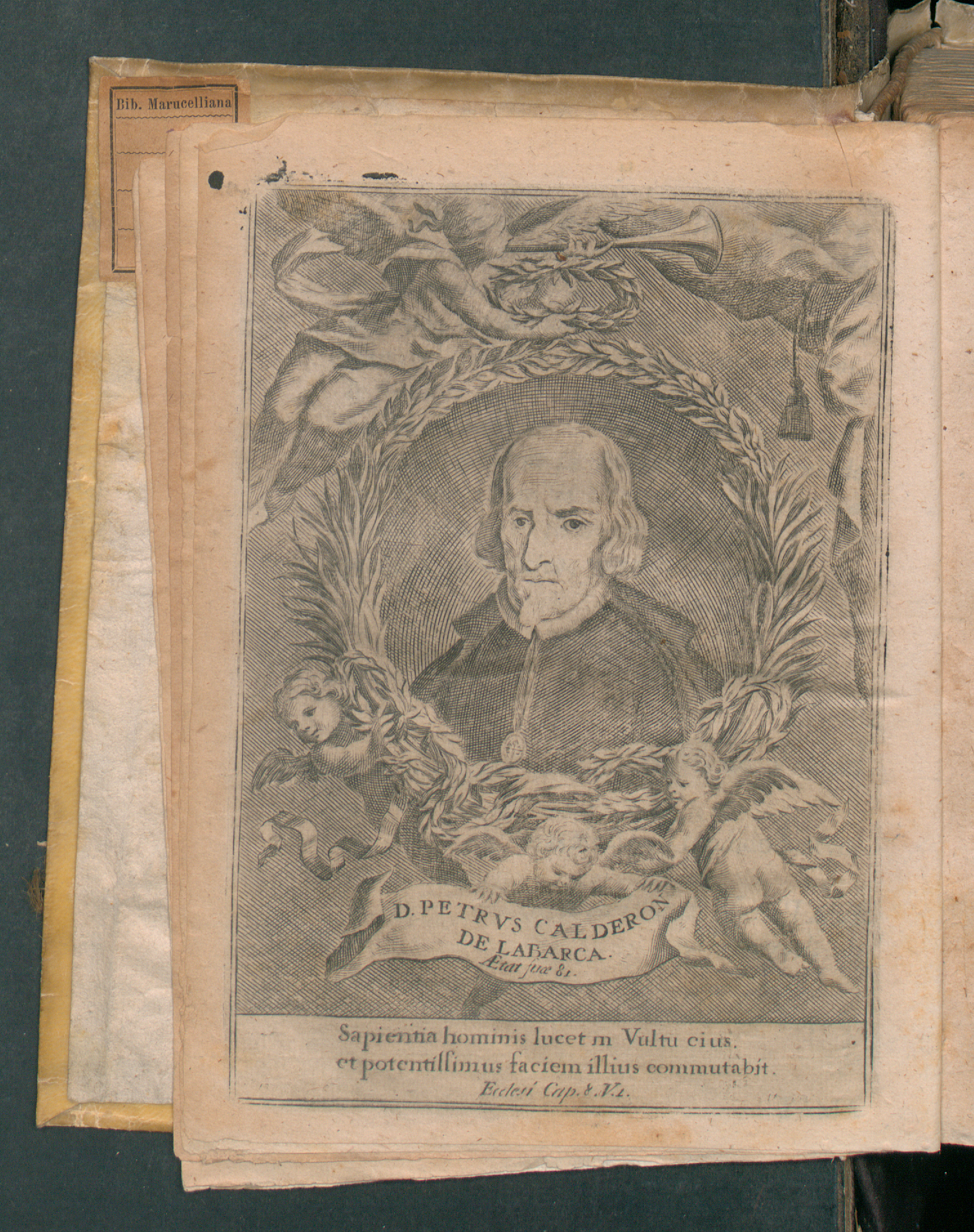
Calderón de la Barca's portrait, in Primera parte de Comedias verdaderas (1726)

Pedro Calderón de la Barca was born in Madrid on Friday 17 January 1600, and was baptized in the parish of San Martín. His father, Diego Calderón, was a mountain hidalgo with family origins in Viveda, Cantabria and had inherited his own father's position of secretary of the Council and Chief Accounting Office of the Treasury, serving in it the Spanish Habsburg Kings Felipe II and Felipe III, died in 1615. The playwright's mother, Ana Gonzalez de Henao (or Henaut, Hainaut), had family roots in the Spanish Netherlands and was of either Flemish or Walloon descent. According to James Fitzmaurice-Kelly, she claimed origin from the De Mons of Hainault. His parents married in 1595. Pedro was the third of the six children that the marriage produced (three boys and three girls), of whom only four survived childhood: Diego, the first-born; (Note: Diego Calderón de la Barca was born in Madrid in 1596. From his grandmother Inés de Riaño's will we know that he was in Mexico in 1612. He married Beatriz Núñez de Alarcón in February 1622 and in 1623 they had a son, José Antonio Calderón, He was a lawyer for the Royal Councils and a rapporteur for War and Justice, helping his parents and uncles several times in legal matters and married in 1653 to the widow Agustina Antonia Ortiz y Velasco. This nephew of Pedro Calderón lived on Calle de las Fuentes and housed the natural son of his uncle, the playwright Pedro José, but he lost his mind and died in 1658, when Pedro José had also died in 1657. As for his father Diego In early 1629 he and his brother, the playwright Pedro, participated in a brawl on Calle Cantarranas, today Calle Lope de Vega, in which comedian Pedro de Villegas, brother of the famous actress Ana de Villegas, was seriously injured. After making a will in Madrid on 13 November 1647, he died later that year.) Dorotea — nun in Toledo—; (Note: Dorotea Calderón de la Barca was born in 1598; She entered the convent of Santa Clara la Real as a novice before the age of fourteen and professed in there of the Order of San Francisco.) Pedro and Jusepe or José. (Note: José Calderón, much loved by his brothers, was born in Valladolid in 1602. He completed his military career, in which he got the job of lieutenant-general-field master; He was wounded in the right leg during the siege of Fuenterrabía in 1638 and died in the Catalan war on 23 June 1645.) (Note: An ancestor of his was Hernando Sánchez Calderón, lord of the Torre de Viveda, near Santillana, Santander province. A son of this gentleman, Álvaro Calderón, went to Aguilar de Campoo, where he married Mencía Sanz; he had three children, Pedro, Juan and Francisco; the firstborn went to live in Sotillo, jurisdiction of Reinosa; his grandson, Diego Calderón, settled in Boadilla del Camino, in Tierra de Campos, Palencia province. Her son, Pedro Calderón, went to Toledo, where he would deal with the wealthy heiress Isabel Ruiz, with whom he married around 1570. They settled in Madrid, and Don Pedro obtained the position of secretary of the Council and Chief Accounting Office of the Treasury, in the one succeeded by his son Don Diego, father of the poet, around 1595.) These brothers were always welcome, as Diego Calderón stated in his will (1647):

All three of us have always conserved ourselves in love and friendship, and without dividing up assets... we have helped each other in the needs and jobs we have had.

However, they also had a natural brother, Francisco, who hid under the surname of "González" and was expelled from the father's house by Don Diego, although he left written in 1615 that he be recognized as legitimate unless he had married "with that woman he tried to marry", in which case he would be disinherited.

His mother died when Calderón was ten years old, in 1610. Calderón was then educated at the Jesuit Collegio in Madrid, the Colegio Imperial, with a view to taking orders; but instead, he studied law at Salamanca.

Between 1620 and 1622 Calderón won several poetry contests in honor of the feast day of St. Isidore, the patron saint of Madrid. Calderón's debut as a playwright was Amor, honor y poder ("Love, honor, and power"), about the life of King Edward III of England, was performed at the Royal Alcázar of Madrid during the visit of Charles, Prince of Wales to unsuccessfully negotiate for a dynastic marriage with Infanta Maria Anna of Spain, on 29 June 1623.

This was followed by two other plays that same year: La selva confusa and Los Macabeos. Over the next two decades, Calderón wrote more than 70 plays, the majority of which were secular dramas written for the commercial theatres.

Calderón served in the Spanish Royal Army in Italy and Flanders between 1625 and 1635. By the time Lope de Vega died in 1635, Calderón was recognized as the foremost Spanish dramatist of the age. Calderón had also gained considerable favour in the court, and in 1636–1637 he was made a knight of the Order of Santiago by Philip IV, who had already commissioned from him a series of spectacular plays for the royal theatre in the newly built Buen Retiro palace. On 28 May 1640 he joined a company of mounted cuirassiers recently raised by Gaspar de Guzmán, Count-Duke of Olivares, took part in the Catalan campaign, and distinguished himself by his gallantry at Tarragona. His health failing, Calderón retired from the army in November 1642, and three years later was awarded a special military pension in recognition of his services in the field.

Calderón's biography during the next few years is obscure. His brother, Diego Calderón, died in 1647. A son, Pedro José, was born to Calderón and an unknown woman between 1647 and 1649; the mother died soon after. Calderón committed his son to the care of his nephew, José, son of Diego. Perhaps for reasons relating to these personal trials, Calderón became a tertiary of the order of St Francis in 1650, and then finally joined the priesthood. He was ordained in 1651 and served as a parish priest at San Salvador Church in Madrid, which was later demolished as part of the 19th-century Spanish confiscations. According to a statement Calderón made a year or two later, he decided to give up writing secular drama for the commercial theatres.

Though he did not adhere strictly to this resolution, he now wrote mostly mythological plays for the palace theatres, and autos sacramentales—one-act allegories illustrating the Real Presence in the Eucharist—for performance during the feast of Corpus Christi. In 1662, two of Calderón's autos, Las órdenes militares and Mística y real Babilonia, were the subjects of an investigation by the Spanish Inquisition; the former was censored, its manuscripts confiscated, and it remained banned until 1671.

Even so, Calderón was appointed honorary chaplain to Philip IV in 1663, and continued as chaplain to his successor. In his eighty-first year he wrote his last secular play, Hado y Divisa de Leonido y Marfisa, in honor of Charles II's marriage to Maria Luisa of Orléans.

Notwithstanding his position at court and his popularity throughout Spain, near the end of his life Calderón struggled with financial difficulties, but with the motivation of the Carnival of 1680 he wrote his last work of comedy, Hado y divisa de Leonido y de Marfisa. He died on 25 May 1681, leaving only partially complete the autos sacramentales that he had been working on for that year. His burial was austere and unembellished, as he desired in his will: "Uncovered, as if I deserved to satisfy in part the public vanities of my poorly spent life". In this manner he left the theatres orphaned in which he was considered one of the best dramatic writers of his time.

== Style ==
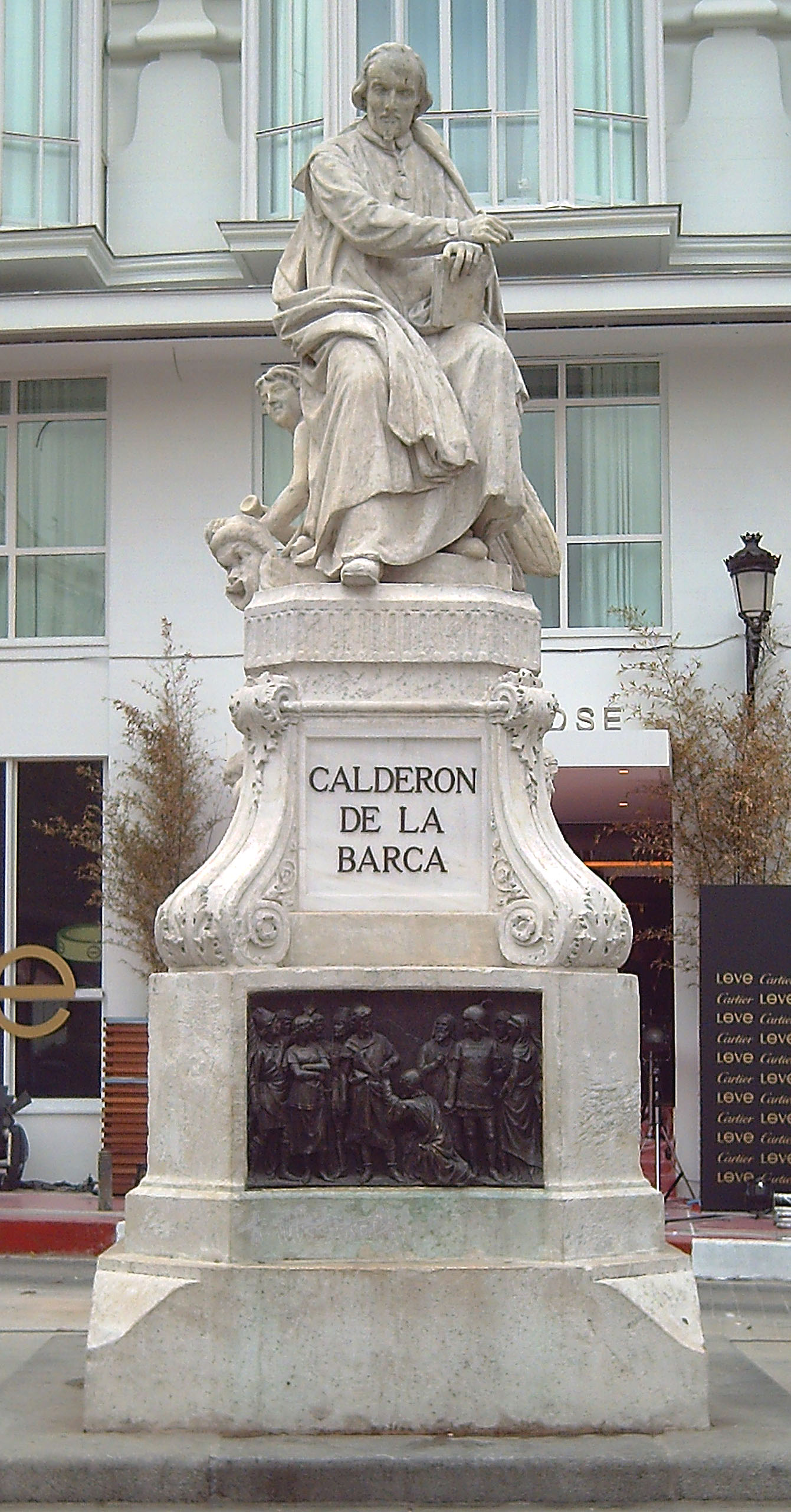
Monument to Calderón on Plaza de Santa Ana, Madrid (J. Figueras, 1878)

=== Theatrical innovator ===
Calderón initiated what has been called the second cycle of Spanish Golden Age theatre. Whereas his predecessor, Lope de Vega, pioneered the dramatic forms and genres of Spanish Golden Age theatre, Calderón polished and perfected them. Whereas Lope's strength lay in the spontaneity and naturalness of his work, Calderón's strength lay in his capacity for poetic beauty, dramatic structure and philosophical and theological depth. Calderón was a perfectionist who often revisited and reworked his plays, even long after they were first performed.

His perfectionism was not just limited to his own work: several of his plays adapt and reimagine existing plays or scenes by other dramatists, improving their depth, complexity, and unity. Calderón excelled above all others in the genre of the "auto sacramental", in which he showed a seemingly inexhaustible capacity to giving new dramatic forms to a given set of theological and philosophical constructs. Calderón wrote 120 "comedias", 80 "autos sacramentales" and 20 short comedic works called entremeses.

As Goethe notes, Calderón tended to take special care with the dramatic structures of his plays. He usually included fewer scenes than other contemporary playwrights (such as Lope de Vega) so as to avoid any superfluous distractions from the essential focus of the plays. He also worked towards a greater stylistic uniformity by reducing the number of different metres in his plays.

Calderón realized that any play was a work of fiction, and that the structure of the baroque play was entirely artificial. He therefore, probably influenced by Cervantes, made regular use of metafictional techniques, such as making his characters joke about the clichés they are expected to slavishly follow.

Most famously in his masterpiece, La Vida es Sueño, Calderón uses an astrological prophecy made decades before the beginning of the play as a way to deliberately mislead the audience about how the plot will unfold. Calderón intended to subtly defend the Catholic doctrine of free will against the Calvinist doctrine of predestination and to depict the unwritten nature of each individual's future based on their choices.

Although his poetry and plays leaned towards culteranismo, Calderón usually reduced the level and obscurity of that style by avoiding metaphors and references that uneducated viewers would not understand. However, he had a great influence anyway in later centuries upon Symbolism, for example by making a fall from a horse a metaphor for a fall into disgrace or dishonour.

=== Themes ===
Some of the most common themes of his plays were heavily influenced by his Classical Christian education by the Jesuits. For example, as a reader and great admirer of Scholastic theologians Saint Thomas Aquinas and Francisco Suárez, Calderón liked to confront reason against emotion, intellect against instinct, love against vengeance, and understanding against the will.

This is not to say, however, that Calderón has never had his critics. In an article for the 1911 Catholic Encyclopedia, Harvard University Professor Jeremiah Ford wrote, "Were one to contrast Shakespeare with Lope de Vega, he would discover that, while Shakespeare belongs to all men and all time, Lope is the particular property of Spain, and is bounded by national limitations. The character of Calderón is even more limited still; he is not only Spanish rather than universal, but, as a Spaniard, he typifies the sentiments and ideals of a narrowly restricted period, the seventeenth century. It may be added that in his theatre and in his daily life he was a model of the truly Christian and knightly poet of his period. The ideas most distinctive of his age which we see reflected in Calderón's dramatic works are intense devotion to the Catholic Faith; absolute and unquestioning loyalty to the Spanish sovereign; and a highly developed, even much exaggerated, feeling of honour."

According to Richard E. Chandler and Kessel Schwartz, it is vital to realize, that despite the end of the Reconquista in 1492 many elements of Islamic Spain rooted in Sharia Law still persisted among the Christian population during the lifetime of Calderón; "One must understand the point of honor (pundonor) and resulting social complications to understand the theatre of Calderón, or, in fact, any of the Golden Age dramatists. A man's honor was a touchy point, based primarily upon a highly refined sentiment of conjugal fidelity but extended to include a man's daughters, married or unmarried, or any other woman in his household. Also, honor had to be kept inviolate -- an extremely difficult thing to accomplish -- and if sullied, had to be avenged. Arising from the Spaniard's sense of personal dignity and his desire to protect his reputation, it became a matter of pride and self-respect to cleanse tarnished honor, which even gossip could blemish. All male members of the household were responsible for protecting the family's name, and no honorable gentleman could leave family honor unavenged. In relationships between the sexes, the code of honor became especially sinister and led to the most barbarous cruelties. A husband was permitted to kill his wife if she was even suspected of infidelity, and her lover had to be murdered to avoid a scandal. Love was the great game, and the responsibilities of a household of an attractive woman was a terrible burden and source of worry for the husband or father. One bloody vengeance called for another, and bloody feuds raged through entire families. The ladies, especially those of Calderón and Tirso, were highly susceptible to risqué situations and quite unafraid to run the risk of a compromising and dishonoring one. Calderón was a court poet and was consequently versed in all the intricacies of the honor code."

Jeremiah Ford continued, "The point of honour, often carried to morbid extremes, provides the motif in such characteristic pieces as the Alcade de Zalamea, the Pintor de su deshonra, the Médico de su honra, and A secreto agravio secreta venganza. The actuating principle in these works can hardly appeal to us; we can feel little sympathy with a personage who methodically and in cold blood slays the one by whom his honour has been affronted. For us such an action is a perversion of the ideals of chivalry."

In contrast, Alexander A. Parker has argued, in an article of his own for Encyclopedia Britannica, that Calderón was actually a very harsh moral critic of Spanish culture at the time in which he lived, "Accepting the conventions of the comedy of intrigue, a favourite form on the Spanish stage, he used them for a fundamentally serious purpose. La dama duende (1629; 'The Phantom Lady') is a neat and lively example. In Casa con dos puertas, mala es de guardar (1629; 'A House with Two Doors Is Difficult to Guard'), the intrigues of secret courtship and the disguises that it necessitates are so presented that the traditional seclusion of women on which these intrigues are based is shown to create social disorder by breeding enmity and endangering love and friendship. No siempre lo peor es cierto (c. 1640; 'The Worst Is Not Always True') and No hay cosa como callar (1639; 'Silence Is Golden') mark the peak of this development; although the conventions of comedy remain, the overtones are tragic. Both plays also implicitly criticize the accepted code of honour. Calderón’s rejection of the rigid assumptions of the code of honour is evident also in his tragedies. In the famous El alcalde de Zalamea, the secrecy and the vengeance demanded by the code are rejected. This play also presents a powerful contrast between the aristocracy and the people: the degeneration of the aristocratic ideal is exposed, wealth is associated with manual labour, and honour is shown to be the consequence and prerogative of moral integrity regardless of class."

According to Richard E. Chandler and Kessel Schwartz, "El médico de su honra is the most extreme of his honor tragedies. It revolves around a point of honor and recounts how a husband, suspecting his wife of infidelity, causes her veins to be opened. She bleeds to death, washing his dishonor away with her blood."

While acknowledging that the plot of the same play has caused Calderón's humanity to be questioned, Alexander A. Parker has written, "The critics who allege that he approves of the murder of an innocent wife because honour demands it overlook the fact that the horror one feels at this deed is precisely what he intended."

In common with many writers from the Spanish Golden Age, his plays usually show his vital pessimism, that is only softened by his rationalism and his faith in the Christian God; the anguish and distress usually found his œuvre is better exemplified in one of his most famous plays, La vida es sueño (Life Is a Dream), in which Segismundo claims:

¿Qué es la vida? Un frenesí.
¿Qué es la vida? Una ilusión,
una sombra, una ficción,
y el mayor bien es pequeño.
¡Que toda la vida es sueño,
y los sueños, sueños son!

Translation:

What is life? A frenzy.
What is life? An illusion,
A shadow, a fiction,
And the greatest good is small;
For all of life is a dream,
And dreams, are only dreams.

=== Comedy of Intrigue ===
According to Richard E. Chandler and Kessel Schwartz, "Calderón's 'cape and sword' plays represent the perfection of a type introduced by Lope. They illustrate the type carried to the extreme of its possibilities, with unbelievably complicated plots worked out with mathematical precision. Lovers' intrigues, honor complications, sudden appearances, and many other tricks and devices are resorted to by the playwright to complicate and then to disentangle the story. In these plays, as well as in the honor tragedies, Calderón, the most profoundly Spanish poet of his epoch, speaks so intimately to the passions and ideals of the time that he often lacks the little universality which his contemporaries achieved... Although he lacked the spontaneity and variety of the Phoenix, he frequently equaled him and at times surpassed him in sheer beauty of poetry with rapturous heights which even Lope could not equal. He was more profound and philosophical than Lope. He was an aristocratic poet and, unlike Lope, did not slavishly cater to the demands of the public. Lope was the improviser, Calderón was the planner."

=== Autos Sacramentales ===
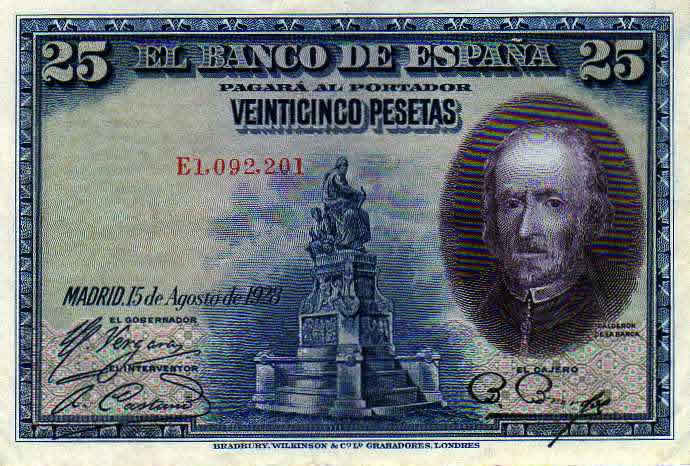
Calderón depicted on a 1928 25 Pesetas banknote.

Indeed, his themes tended to be complex and philosophical, and express complicated states of mind in a manner that few playwrights have been able to manage. Like Baltasar Gracián, Calderón favoured only the deepest human feelings and moral dilemmas.

Since Calderón's plays were usually produced at the court of the King of Spain, he had access to the most modern techniques regarding scenography. He collaborated with Cosme Lotti in developing complex scenographies that were integrated in some of his plays, specially his most religious-themed ones such as the Autos Sacramentales, becoming extremely complex allegories of moral, philosophical and religious concepts.

According to Richard E. Chandler and Kessel Schwartz, "As a writer of Autos Sacramentales, Calderón is supreme. The Auto, cultivated since the time of Gil Vicente, is a one act play, generally allegorical in nature, which at one time or another treats the miracle of Transubstantiation. Autos were performed in Spain's large cities during the Corpus Christi festival in the open air on temporary stages set up in some public square. Everyone, including the royalty, attended the public performances, which followed the Processional of the Host through the streets to the church. Some believe that these short pieces represent the best of the Calderonian theatre where his fertile imagination had free rein and his sincere religious motives and faith found their purest expression."

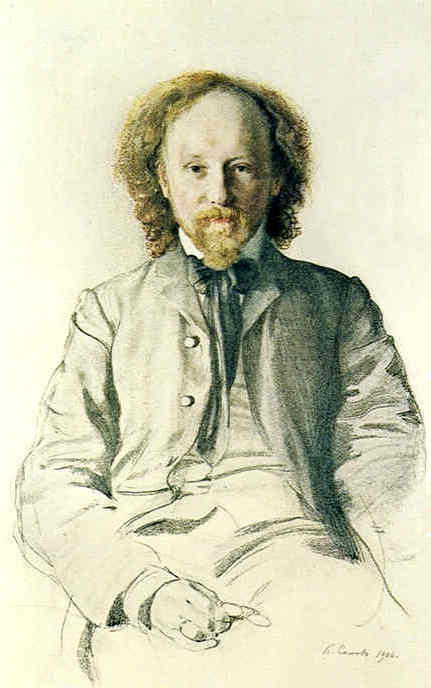
Portrait of Vyacheslav Ivanov by Konstantin Somov (1906).

According to Russian Symbolist poet and dramatic theorist Vyacheslav Ivanov, "Let us take a look at drama, which in modern history has replaced the spectacles of universal and holy events as reflected in miniature and purely signifying forms on the stages of the mystery plays. We know that classical French tragedy is one of triumphs of the transformational, decisive idealistic principle. Calderón, however, is different. In him, everything is but a signification of the objective truth of Divine Providence, which governs human destiny. A pious son of the Spanish Church, he was able to combine all the daring of naive individualism with the most profound realism of the mystical contemplation of divine things."

== Legacy ==
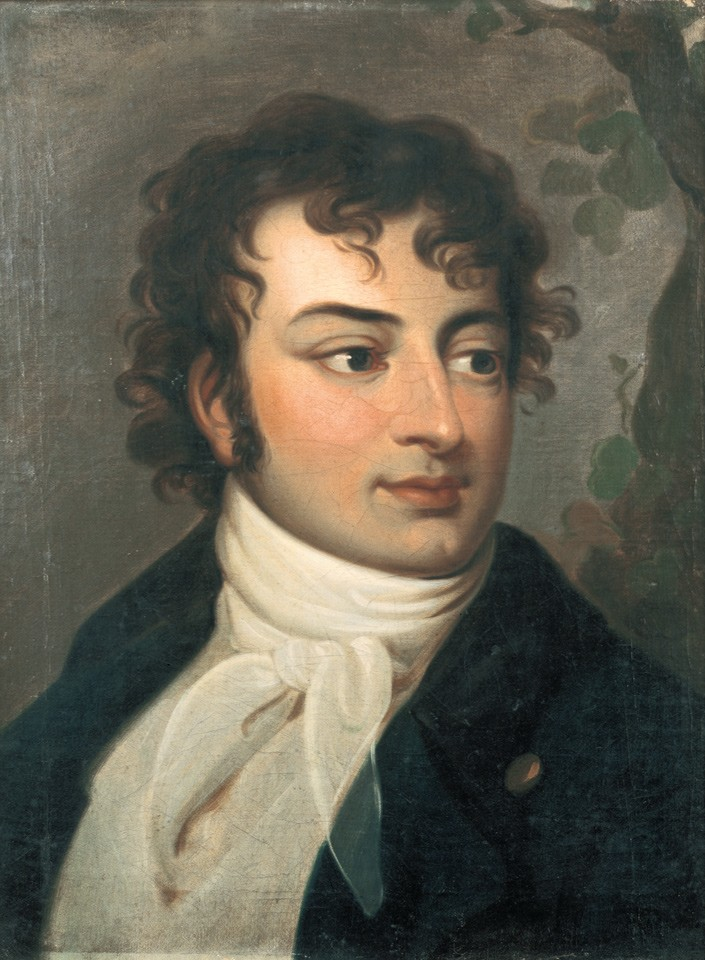
Calderón translator and literary critic August Wilhelm Schlegel, c. 1800

Calderón's fame dwindled during the 18th-century due to the anti-religious currents of both the Bourbon Reforms and the Enlightenment in Spain and, in 1765, a law was passed forbidding the performance of Autos on the Feast of Corpus Christi, officially for being, "sacrilegious and in bad taste."

Within mere decades, though, Calderón was rediscovered in the Germanosphere by highly influential Jena Romantic poet and Indologist August Wilhelm Schlegel. Schlegel's literary translations and high critical praise rekindled interest in Calderón, who, along with Shakespeare, became a banner figure, first for German Romanticism, and then for Romanticism in many other countries and languages. E. T. A. Hoffmann based his 1807 singspiel Liebe und Eifersucht on a stage play by Calderón, La banda y la flor (The Scarf and the Flower), as translated by Schlegel. In subsequent decades, Calderón was repeatedly translated into German, most notably by Johann Diederich Gries and Joseph von Eichendorff, and had an enthusiastic reception on the German and Austrian stages, particularly under the direction of Goethe, and Joseph Schreyvogel. Later significant German-language adaptations include the work of highly influential Austrian Symbolist poet, metafictional playwright, and Richard Strauss' favorite opera librettist Hugo von Hofmannsthal; who made literary translations of La vida es sueño and El gran teatro del mundo.

During the 19th century in his homeland, Calderón de la Barca was embraced by adherents of Carlism and other opponents of the 1798-1924 mass confiscation and sale of Church property by the State, the expulsion of the religious orders, the ban on Classical Christian education, and the many other anti-Catholic policies of Liberal Spanish monarchs and their ministers. In 1881, during a controversial gathering at El Retiro, an urban park on the site of the demolished Royal palace where many of his plays were first performed, on the two hundredth anniversary of Calderón's death, Marcelino Menéndez Pelayo raised a toast to the religious values of Calderón's Spain and the supremacy of the Latino race over "Germanic barbarity", by which Menéndez Pelayo meant anti-Catholic Spanish Krausist and the Hegelianist intellectuals.

Félix Sardà y Salvany, the author of the book Liberalism Is a Sin, and his fellow integrists and Carlists considered Calderón de la Barca to embody the most brilliant incarnation of the Spanish Catholic literary tradition.

During the pre-1917 Silver Age of Russian Poetry, highly influential Russian Symbolist poet and dramatic theorist Vyacheslav Ivanov, who was heavily influenced by German Romanticism, was accordingly an enthusiast for Calderón. On 19 April 1910, Vsevolod Meyerhold even staged Konstantin Balmont's literary translation of Calderón's Adoration of the Holy Cross during the weekly literary salon held inside Ivanov's flat overlooking the Tauride Palace in St Petersburg. Many of the most important figures in Russian literature at the time were either present or acting in the play.

Although he is best known abroad as the Nobel Prize-winning author of Doctor Zhivago, Soviet dissident intellectual and former Ivanov protege Boris Pasternak produced acclaimed Russian translations of Calderón's plays during the late 1950s. According to his mistress, Olga Ivinskaya,

In working on Calderón he received help from Nikolai Mikhailovich Liubumov, a shrewd and enlightened person who understood very well that all the mudslinging and commotion over the novel would be forgotten, but that there would always be a Pasternak. I took finished bits of the translation with me to Moscow, read them to Liubimov at Potapov Street, and then went back to Peredelkino, where I would tactfully ask [Boris Leonidovich] to change passages which, in Liubimov's view departed too far from the original. Very soon after the "scandal" was over, [Boris Leonidovich] received a first payment for the work on Calderón.

Following the end of the Spanish Civil War, Calderón was embraced as a national poet by the Francoist government. This, however, has not harmed his popularity in Spain in the years since the transition back to constitutional monarchy.

=== English ===
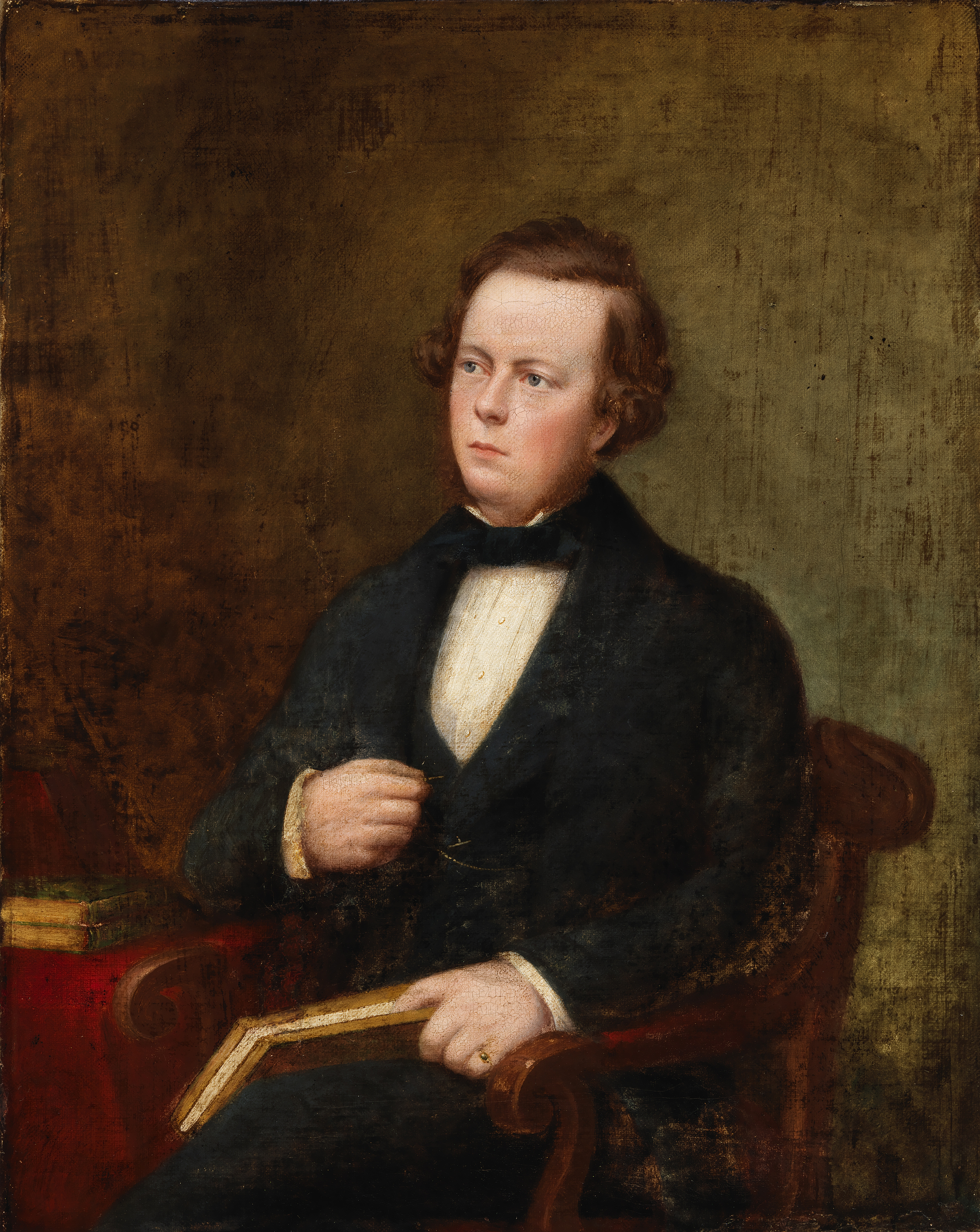
Calderón translator Denis Florence McCarthy (1817–1882).

The persistent influence of both anti-Catholicism and anti-Spanish sentiment rooted in the Black Legend still means that even the existence of the Spanish Golden Age, let alone its literary, artistic, and cultural achievements, remain widely unknown in the English-speaking world. Both this ignorance and its cultural fallout were criticized even during the Black Legend's Elizabethan era inception by Sir Philip Sidney, whose 1580 essay An Apology for Poetry expressed very high praise for the verse dramas he had attended during diplomatic missions in France, Spain, and Italy. Playwrights in Catholic Europe during the Counter-Reformation had revived Aristotle's three Classical unities and Sidney for these and many other reasons considered them vastly superior to all the plays then being written and performed in England.

Despite this, Calderón's plays were first translated and performed in English during his lifetime. For instance, the diary of Stuart Restoration courtier Samuel Pepys describes attending stage plays in London during 1667 which were free translations from Calderón. During the same era, Calderón's many emulators in writing for the English stage included Poet Laureate of England John Dryden.

Centuries later, like his German Romantic colleagues, English Romantic poet Lord Byron repeatedly referenced Calderón, whom he viewed as "a romantic figure". Byron's friend and fellow Romantic poet Percy Bysshe Shelley similarly had very high praise in his essays for Calderón and personally translated a substantial portion of El Mágico prodigioso.

Despite this, in his essay A Defence of Poetry, Shelley, as a staunch and vocal believer in Atheism, feminism, and the rejection of Christian morality, also expressed very harsh criticism for Calderón's religious beliefs and his regular decision to confront the human mind and conscience successfully against the emotions, "Calderón, in his religious autos, has attempted to fulfill some of the high conditions of dramatic presentation neglected by Shakespeare; such as establishing a relation between drama and religion, and the accommodating them to music and dancing; but he admits the observation of conditions still more important, and more is lost than gained by the substitution of the rigidly defined and ever-repeated idealism of a distorted superstition for the living impersonations of the truth of human passion."

Later in the same essay, however, Shelley concluded, "The exertions of Locke, Hume, Gibbon, Voltaire, Rousseau, and their disciples, in favor of oppressed and deluded humanity, are entitled to the gratitude of mankind. Yet it is easy to calculate the degree of moral and intellectual improvement which the world would have exhibited, had they never lived. A little more nonsense would have been talked for a century or two; and perhaps a few more men, women, and children burnt as heretics. We might not at this moment have been congratulating each other on the abolition of the Inquisition in Spain. But it exceeds all imagination to conceive what would have been the moral condition of the world if neither Dante, Petrarch, Boccaccio, Chaucer, Shakespeare, Calderón, Lord Bacon, nor Milton, had ever existed; if Raphael and Michelangelo had never been born; if the Hebrew poetry had never been translated; if a revival of the study of Greek literature had never taken place; if no monuments of ancient sculpture had been handed down to us; and if the poetry of the religion of the ancient world had been extinguished together with its belief. The human mind could never, except by the intervention of these excitements, have been awakened to the invention of the grosser sciences, and that application of analytical reasoning to the aberrations of society, which it is now attempted to exalt over the direct expression of the inventive and creative faculty itself."

The poetic and accurate Victorian era translations of Irish Catholic poet Denis Florence MacCarthy were commenced because MacCarthy was a great admirer of Shelley and therefore took the latter's high critical praise of Calderón in multiple essays very seriously.

George Ticknor declared in his History of Spanish Literature that MacCarthy "has succeeded in giving a faithful idea of what is grandest and most effective in [Calderón's] genius... to a degree which I had previously thought impossible. Nothing, I think, in the English language will give us so true an impression of what is most characteristic of the Spanish drama, and of Spanish poetry generally."

So highly regarded were MacCarthy's translations that in 1881, he was awarded a medal by the Royal Spanish Academy on the two-hundredth anniversary of Calderón's death.

Other translators of Calderón's works into English have included Edward FitzGerald, Roy Campbell, Edwin Honig, Kenneth Muir & Ann L. Mackenzie, Adrian Mitchell, Gwynne Edwards, and Jo Clifford.

A recent revival of interest in Calderón scholarship can be attributed to British reception, namely through the works of A. A. Parker (who considered La hija del aire to be his finest work), A. E. Sloman and more recently Bruce Wardropper.

== Selected works ==
=== Plays ===
- Amor, honor y poder (Love, Honor and Power) (1623)
- El sitio de Breda (The Siege of Breda) (1625)

La vida es sueño (Life is a dream)
Calderón de la Barca, Life is a dream, act II, scene 19, Monologue of Segismundo

- La dama duende (The Phantom Lady) (1629)
- Casa con dos puertas (The House with Two Doors) (1629)
- La vida es sueño (Life is a Dream) (1629–1635)
- La banda y la flor (The Scarf and the Flower, comedy, 1632), adapted by E. T. A. Hoffmann as the Singspiel Liebe und Eifersucht (1807)
- El purgatorio de San Patricio (The Purgatory of St. Patrick), inspired by the Lough Derg, County Donegal pilgrimage shrine of the same name, (before 1635)
- El mayor encanto, amor (Love, the Greatest Enchantment) (1635)
- Los tres mayores prodigios (The Three Greatest Wonders) (1636)
- La devoción de la Cruz (Devotion to the Cross) (1637)
- El mágico prodigioso (The Mighty Magician) (1637)
- A secreto agravio, secreta venganza (Secret Vengeance for Secret Insult) (1637)
- El médico de su honra (The Surgeon of his Honor) (1637)
- El pintor de su deshonra (The Painter of His Dishonor) (1640s)
- El alcalde de Zalamea (The Mayor of Zalamea) (1651)
- La hija del aire (The Daughter of the Air) (1653)
- Eco y Narciso (Eco and Narcissus) (1661)
- La estatua de Prometeo (Prometheus' Statue)
- El prodigio de Alemania (The Prodigy of Germany) (in collaboration with Antonio Coello)

=== Operas ===
- Celos aun del aire matan 1660

=== Autos Sacramentales (Sacramental plays) ===
- La cena del rey Baltasar (Belshazzar's Feast)
- El gran teatro del mundo (The Great Theater of the World)
- El gran mercado del mundo (The World is a Fair)
- Las órdenes militares
- Mística y real Babilonia

=== Comedies ===
For a time the comedic works of Calderón were underestimated, but have since been reevaluated and have been considered as masterfully composed works as being classified in the genre of comedias de enredo, such as his works La dama duende (The Phantom Lady), Casa con dos puertas, mala es de guardar (A house with two doors is difficult to guard), or El galán fantasma (The Heroic Phantom).

== In popular culture ==
- The 1997 Alejandro Amenábar science fiction film Open Your Eyes, which was later remade in Hollywood as Vanilla Sky, has drawn many comparisons to Calderón's La vida es Sueño.
- Calderón de la Barca appears in the 1998 Captain Alatriste novel The Sun over Breda by Arturo Pérez-Reverte, which takes up the assumption that he served in the Spanish Royal Army at Flanders and depicts him helping the local librarian save books from the library in the burning town hall during the sack of Oudkerk.

== Sources ==
Corrections have been made to biographical information using

- Cotarelo y Mori, D. Emilio. Ensayo sobre la vida y obras de D. Pedro Calderón de la Barca. Ed. Facs. Ignacio Arellano y Juan Manuel Escudero. Biblioteca Áurea Hispánica. Madrid;Frankfurt: Iberoamericana; Veuvuert, 2001.

The style section uses the following bibliographical information

- Kurt & Roswitha Reichenberger: "Bibliographisches Handbuch der Calderón-Forschung /Manual bibliográfico calderoniano (I): Die Calderón-Texte und ihre Überlieferung durch Wichser". Kassel, Edition Reichenberger 1979. ISBN 3-87816-023-2
- Enrique Ruul Fernandez, "Estudio y Edición crítica de Celos aun del aire matan, de Pedro Calderón de la Barca", UNED, 2004. ISBN 978-84-362-4882-1
- "A Hundred Years dressing Calderón", Sociedad Estatal para la acción cultural exterior, 2009. ISBN 978-84-96933-22-4
