= Fanny Margaretta Holcroft =

English writer (1780–1844)

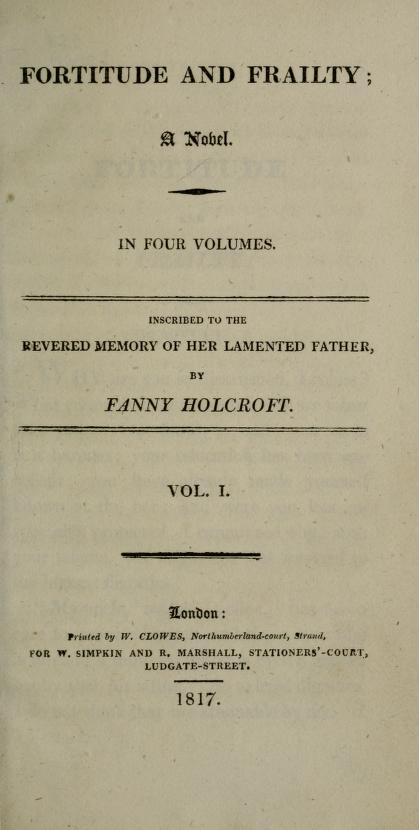
- Title page of Fanny Holcroft's Fortitude and Frailty; a novel (London: W. Simpkin and R. Marshall, 1817)
- Born: 21 February 1780
- Died: 7 October 1844 (aged 64); 40 Cumberland Street, Haggerston, London
- Resting place: St Mary, Haggerston
- Occupation: writer
- Parent(s): Thomas Holcroft (father); Dinah Robinson (mother)
- Writing career
- Language: English

Fanny Margaretta Holcroft (1780–1844), daughter of writer Thomas Holcroft, was a novelist, dramatist, and translator whose work aligned with the progressive tumult of the revolutionary period.

== Life ==
Fanny Margaretta Holcroft was the daughter of Thomas Holcroft and his third wife, Dinah Robinson, who died shortly after giving birth to her. When she was baptized at the age of five, her name was registered as "Fanny," so it was not a nickname, though some records refer to her as "Frances." She had three older half-siblings at the time of her birth — Ann (1766–1841), William (1773–1789), and Sophia (1775–1850) — then her father later remarried and had six further children. Despite the family's ongoing economic precarity, Holcroft received "a broad and liberal education in modern languages and the arts." Thomas Holcroft knew and worked with leading figures of the intelligentsia such as Thomas Paine and William Godwin, and Holcroft shared her father's Jacobin ideals and supported his work to the point where she shared in the public abuse his politics generated. According to her death certificate, she died of "mania" in London at the age of sixty-four.

== Work ==
Fanny Holcroft began publishing poetry when she was seventeen: in 1797 the January, February, and October issues of the Monthly Magazine printed "Annabella," "The Penitent Mother," and the abolitionist "The Negro," respectively. From 1805 to 1806, she translated seven plays (from German, Italian, and Spanish) for her father's Theatrical Recorder and later wrote at least one melodrama of her own. She made one or two short-lived forays into teaching: she lost a position as a governess due to a story in The Times that her father was a French spy, and applied to the Royal Literary Fund in 1809 for help to start a school. She "was driven in her writing by the urgent need for financial survival." In her father's declining years, she worked as his amanuensis. Later in life, she published two novels, both dedicated to her late father: Fortitude and Frailty (1817) and The Wife and the Lover (1813–14). According to Gary Kelly, "These adapt Thomas Holcroft's reformist politics to the post-Napoleonic era of emergent liberalism with stories of vicissitudes in private life, recommending personal virtue and social conciliation."

== Works ==
=== Poetry ===
- "Annabella" (1797)
- "The Negro" (1797)
- "The Penitent Mother" (1797)

=== Novels ===
- Fortitude and Frailty; a Novel. In Four Volumes. Inscribed to the revered memory of her lamented father, by Fanny Holcroft. (London: W. Simpkin and R. Marshall, 1817; available at the Internet Archive: Vol. 1, 2, 3, 4)
- The Wife and the Lover. A Novel, By Miss Holcroft. In Three Volumes. (London: Henry Colburn, 1813)

=== Translations ===
- Translated seven plays by Alfieri, Weisse, Lessing, Calderón, and Moratin for her father's periodical the Theatrical Recorder (1805–6)
- Memoirs of the Life of the Great Condé. By His Serene Highness Louis Joseph de Bourbon, Prince de Condé. (London: Longman, Hurst, Rees, and Orme, 1807; full text at the Internet Archive)

=== Drama ===
- provided incidental music for Thomas Holcroft's successful melodrama The Lady of the Rock (1805)
- one manuscript play survives
