= Life Is a Dream =

Spanish-language play by Pedro Calderón de la Barca

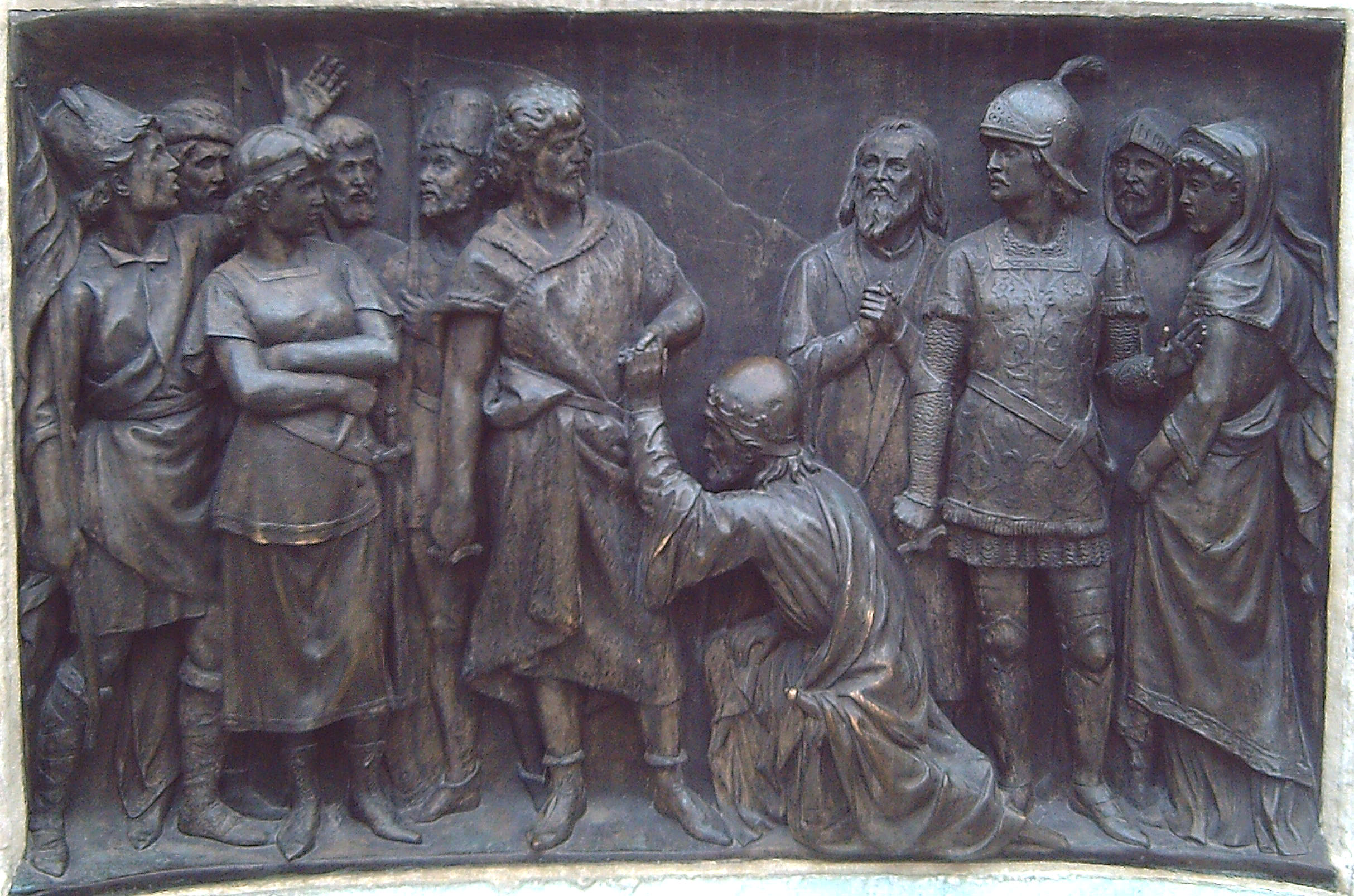
- Detail from bronze relief on a monument to Calderón in Madrid, J. Figueras, 1878
- Original language: Spanish
- Written by: Pedro Calderón de la Barca
- Subject: Free will, fate, honor, power
- Genre: Spanish Golden Age drama
- Setting: Poland

Premiere
- Date: 1635

Life Is a Dream (Spanish: La vida es sueño [la ˈβiða es ˈsweɲo]) is a Spanish-language play by Pedro Calderón de la Barca. First published in 1636, in two different editions, the first in Madrid and a second one in Zaragoza. Don W. Cruickshank and a number of other critics believe that the play can be dated around 1630, thus making Calderón's most famous work a rather early composition. It is a philosophical allegory regarding the human situation and the mystery of life. The play has been described as "the supreme example of Spanish Golden Age drama".

The story focuses on the fictional Segismundo, Prince of Poland, who has been imprisoned in a tower by his father, King Basilio, following a dire prophecy that the prince would bring disaster to the country and death to the King. Basilio briefly frees Segismundo, but when the prince goes on a rampage, the king imprisons him again, persuading him that it was all a dream.

The play's central themes are the conflict between free will and fate, as well as restoring one's honor. It remains one of Calderón's best-known and most studied works, and was listed as one of the 40 greatest plays of all time in The Independent. Other themes include dreams vs. reality and the conflict between father and son. The play has been adapted for other stage works, in film and as a novel.

== Historical context ==
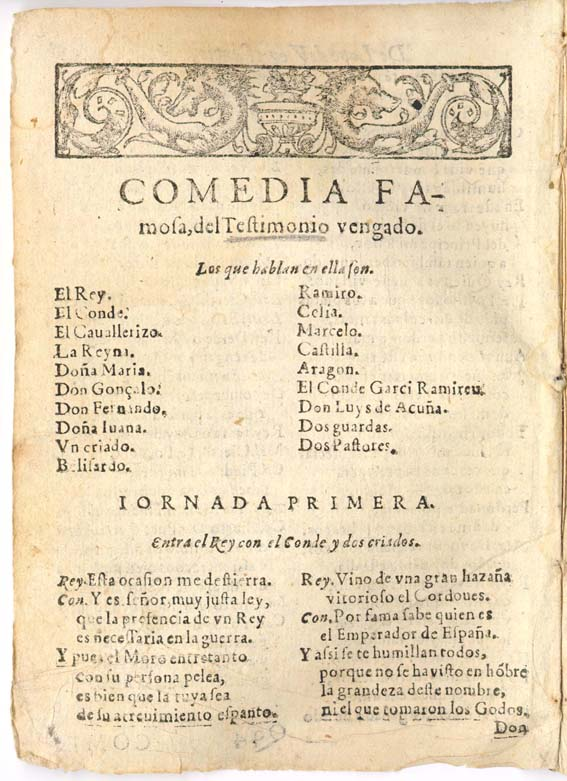
Title page of a comedy by Spanish playwright Lope de Vega

Catholic Spain was the most powerful European nation by the 16th century. The Spanish Armada was defeated by England in 1588, however, while Spain was trying to defend the northern coast of Africa from the expansion of the Turkish Ottoman Empire, and the gold and silver that Spain took from its possessions in the New World were not adequate to sustain its subsequent decades of heavy military expenses. Spain's power was rapidly waning by the time Calderón wrote Life Is a Dream.

The age of Calderón was also marked by deep religious conviction in Spain. The Catholic church had fostered Spanish pride and identity, to the extent that "speaking Christian" became, and remains, synonymous with speaking Spanish.

Another current that permeated Spanish thinking was the departure from the idea that royal power resided in God's will, as noted in Machiavelli's The Prince (1532). Francisco Suárez's treatise On the Defense of Faith (De defensio fidei, 1613) stated that political power resided in the people and rejected the divine rights of kings, and Juan Mariana's On Kings and Kingship (1599) went even further by stating that the people had the right to murder despotic kings.

Amidst these developments during the 16th and 17th centuries, Spain experienced a cultural blossoming referred to as the Spanish Golden Age. It saw the birth of notable works of art: Don Quixote, by Miguel de Cervantes (1605), played with the vague line between reality and perception. Lope de Vega, in his play Fuente Ovejuna (1619), talks about a village that rebels against authority.

== Synopsis ==
=== Act I ===
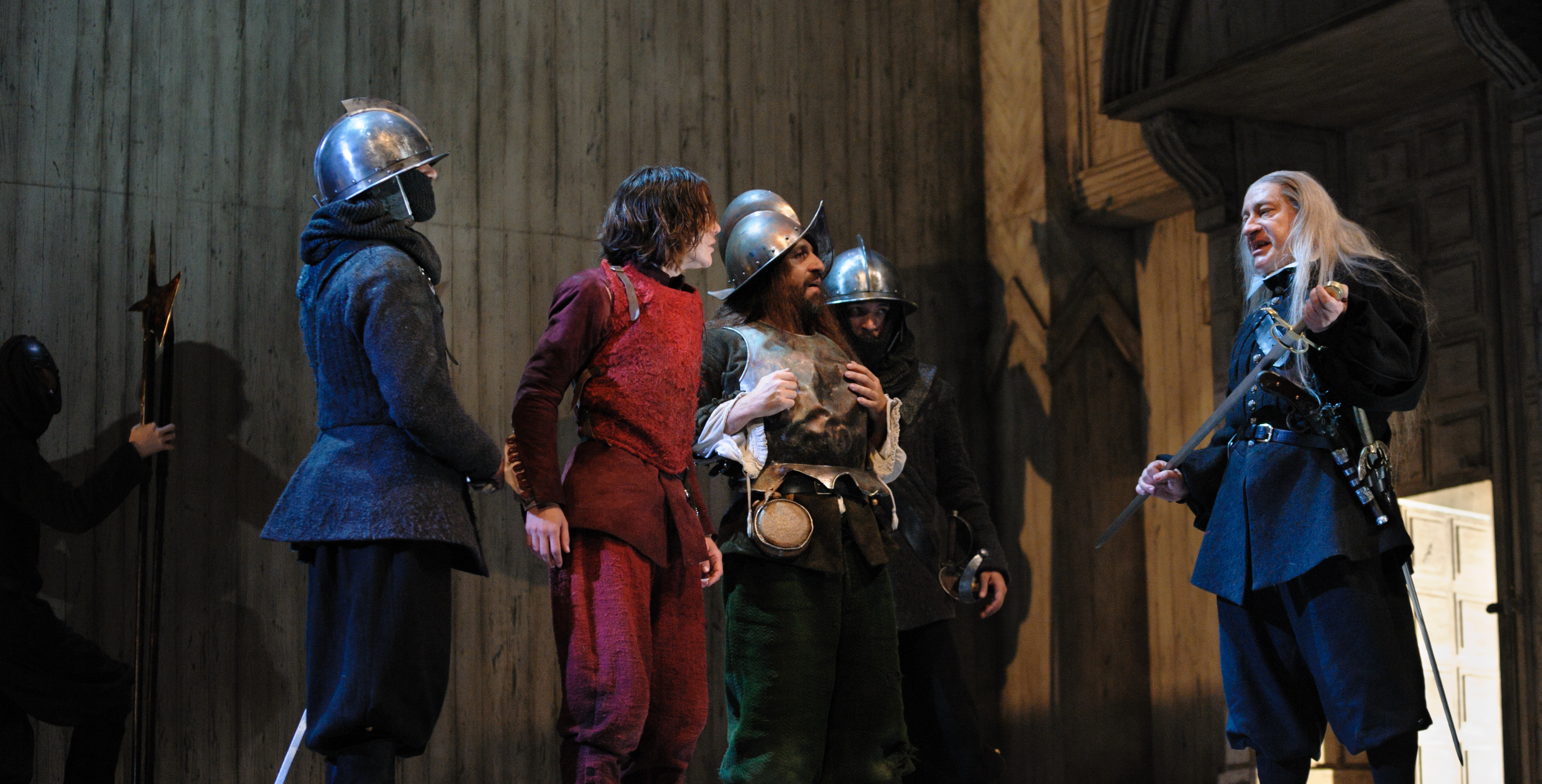
La vida es sueño, 35th Festival Internacional del Teatro Clásico, Almagro (2012)

After being abandoned by their horses, Rosaura, who is dressed as a man, and Clarín walk through the mountains of Poland without food or anywhere to go for the night. They arrive at a tower, where they find Segismundo imprisoned, bound in chains. He tells them that his only crime was being born. Clotaldo, Segismundo's old warden and tutor, arrives and orders his guards to disarm and kill the intruders, but he recognizes Rosaura's sword as his own that he had left behind in Muscovy (for a favor that he owed) years ago for his child to bear. Suspecting that Rosaura is his child (he thinks she is male), he takes Rosaura and Clarín with him to court.

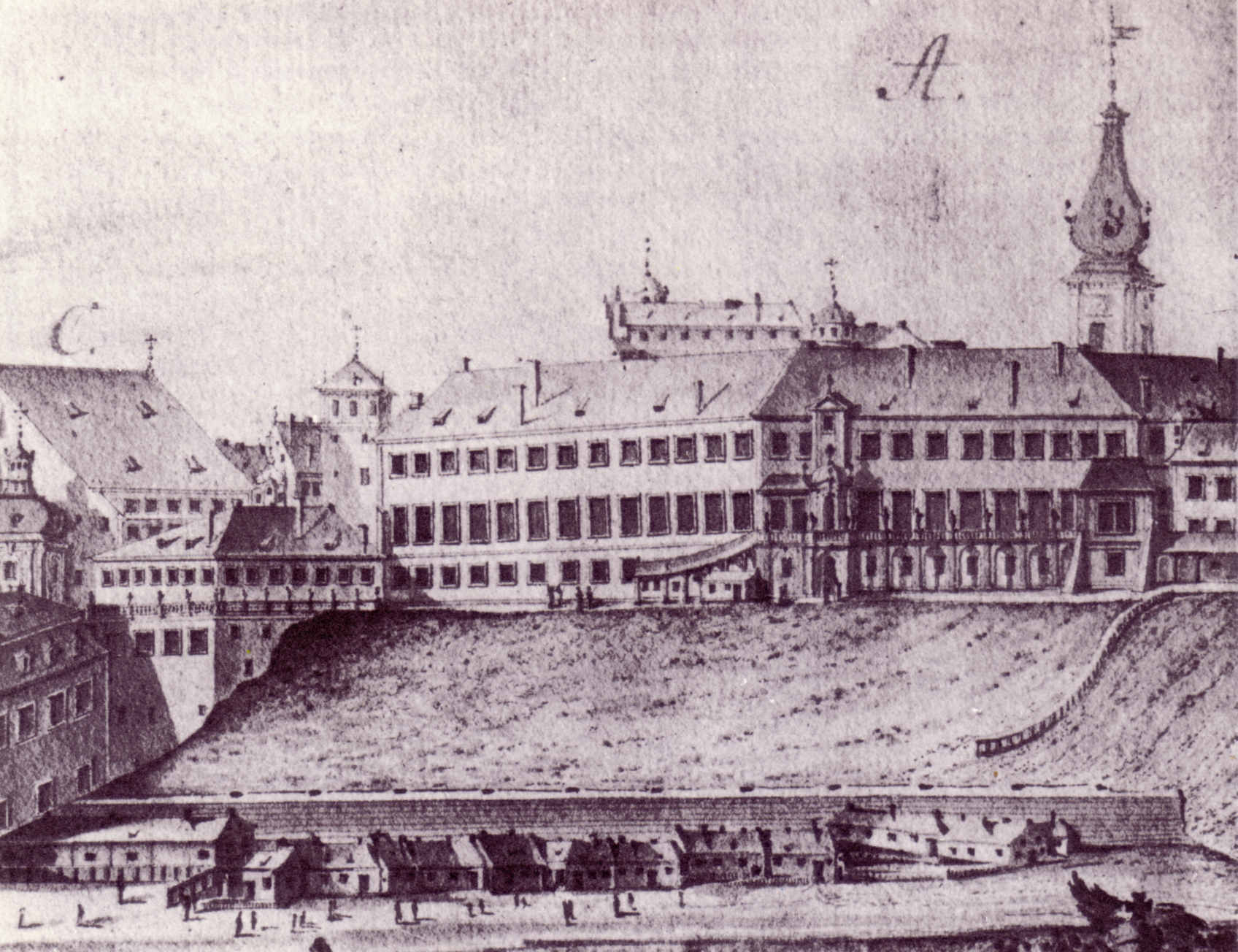
The royal palace in medieval Poland

At the palace, Astolfo (Duke of Muscovy) discusses with his cousin, Princess Estrella (Segismundo's cousin), that as they are the nephew and niece of King Basilio of Poland, they would be his successors if they married each other. Estrella is troubled by the locket that Astolfo wears, with another woman's portrait. Basilio reveals to them that he imprisoned his infant son, Segismundo, due to a prophecy by an oracle that the prince would bring disgrace to Poland and would kill his father, but he wants to grant his son a chance to prove the oracle wrong. If he finds him evil and unworthy, he will send him back to his cell, making way for Astolfo and Estrella to become the new king and queen. Clotaldo enters with Rosaura, telling Basilio that the intruders know about Segismundo. He begs for the king's pardon, as he knows he should have killed them. The king says he should not worry, for his secret has already been revealed. Rosaura tells Clotaldo that she wants revenge against Astolfo, but she won't say why. Clotaldo is reluctant to reveal that he thinks he is Rosaura's father.

=== Act II ===
Clotaldo gives Segismundo a sedative that "robs one in his sleep of his sense and faculties" (109), which puts him in a sleep similar to death. In the Royal Palace of the capital city of Warsaw, Clotaldo has learned that Rosaura is a woman; Clarín explains that Rosaura is Princess Estrella's maid but has been going by the name of Astrea. When Segismundo is awakened and arrives at court, Clotaldo tells him that he is the prince of Poland and heir to the throne. He resents Clotaldo for keeping this secret from him for all those years. He finds Duke Astolfo irritating and is dazzled by Estrella's beauty. When a servant warns him about the princess's betrothal to Astolfo, Segismundo is enraged by the news and throws the servant from the balcony.

The king demands an explanation from his son. He tries to reason with him, but Segismundo announces he will fight everyone, for his rights were denied him for a long time. Basilio warns him that he must behave, or he might find out he's dreaming. Segismundo interrupts a conversation between Rosaura and Clarín. Rosaura wants to leave, but Segismundo tries to seduce her. Clotaldo steps up to defend his child, but Segismundo pulls out a dagger threatening to kill him. As Clotaldo begs for his life, Astolfo challenges Segismundo to a duel. Before they proceed, the king sedates the prince again and sends him back to his cell.

Segismundo's reflections
(close of Act II)

The king dreams he is a king,
And in this delusive way
Lives and rules with sovereign sway;
All the cheers that round him ring,
Born of air, on air take wing.
And in ashes (mournful fate!)
Death dissolves his pride and state:
Who would wish a crown to take,
Seeing that he must awake
In the dream beyond death's gate?

....

'Tis a dream that I in sadness
Here am bound, the scorn of fate;
'Twas a dream that once a state
I enjoyed of light and gladness.
What is life? 'Tis but a madness.
What is life? A thing that seems,
A mirage that falsely gleams,
Phantom joy, delusive rest,
Since is life a dream at best,
And even dreams themselves are dreams.

Segismundo's soliloquy (in Spanish)

After recriminating Astolfo for wearing another woman's portrait around his neck, Estrella commands Rosaura (still going by Astrea) to fetch this locket for her. When she approaches Astolfo for the locket, he says he recognized her as Rosaura and refuses to give her the locket, because the portrait inside is hers. Estrella walks in and demands to see it immediately, but, afraid of being discovered, Rosaura says the locket in Astolfo's hand is actually her own, and that he has hidden the one she was sent to fetch. Estrella leaves furious. Meanwhile, Clotaldo sends Clarín to prison, believing that Clarín knows his secret.

Segismundo mutters in his sleep about murder and revenge. When the prince wakes up, he tells Clotaldo about his "dream". Clotaldo tells him that even in dreams, people must act with kindness and justice. When he leaves, Segismundo is left reflecting on dreams and life.

=== Act III ===
The people find out that they have a prince and many rebel, breaking him out of his prison tower, although at first they comically mistake Clarín for the prince. Segismundo finds Clotaldo, who is afraid of his reaction. Segismundo forgives him, asking Clotaldo to join his cause, but Clotaldo refuses, swearing allegiance to the king. Back in the palace, everyone prepares for battle, and Clotaldo speaks with Rosaura. She asks him to take Astolfo's life, as he had taken her honor before leaving her. Clotaldo refuses, reminding her that Duke Astolfo is now the heir to the throne. When Rosaura asks what will be of her honor, Clotaldo suggests that she spend her days in a nunnery. Disheartened, Rosaura runs away.

As war nears, Segismundo sees Rosaura, who tells him that she was the youth who found him in his prison and also the woman who he tried to seduce in court. She tells him that she was born in Muscovy of a noble woman who was disgraced and abandoned. She had the same fate, falling in love with Astolfo and giving him her honor before he abandoned her to marry Estrella. She followed him to Poland for revenge, finding that Clotaldo is her father, but he is unwilling to fight for her honor. Rosaura compares herself to female warriors Athena and Diana. She wants to join Segismundo's battle and to kill Astolfo or to die fighting. Segismundo agrees. While soldiers cheer for Segismundo, Rosaura and Clarín are reunited, and the king's soldiers approach.

Segismundo's army is winning the battle. Basilio, Clotaldo and Astolfo are preparing to escape when Clarín is killed in front of them. Segismundo arrives and Basilio faces his son, waiting for his death, but Segismundo spares his life. In light of the Prince's generous attitude, the King proclaims Segismundo heir to his throne. As king, Segismundo decides that Astolfo must keep his promise to marry Rosaura to preserve her honor. At first Astolfo is hesitant because she is not of noble birth, but when Clotaldo reveals that she is his daughter, Astolfo consents. Segismundo then claims Estrella in marriage himself. Segismundo resolves to live by the motto that "God is God", acknowledging that, whether asleep or awake, one must strive for goodness.

== Themes and motifs ==
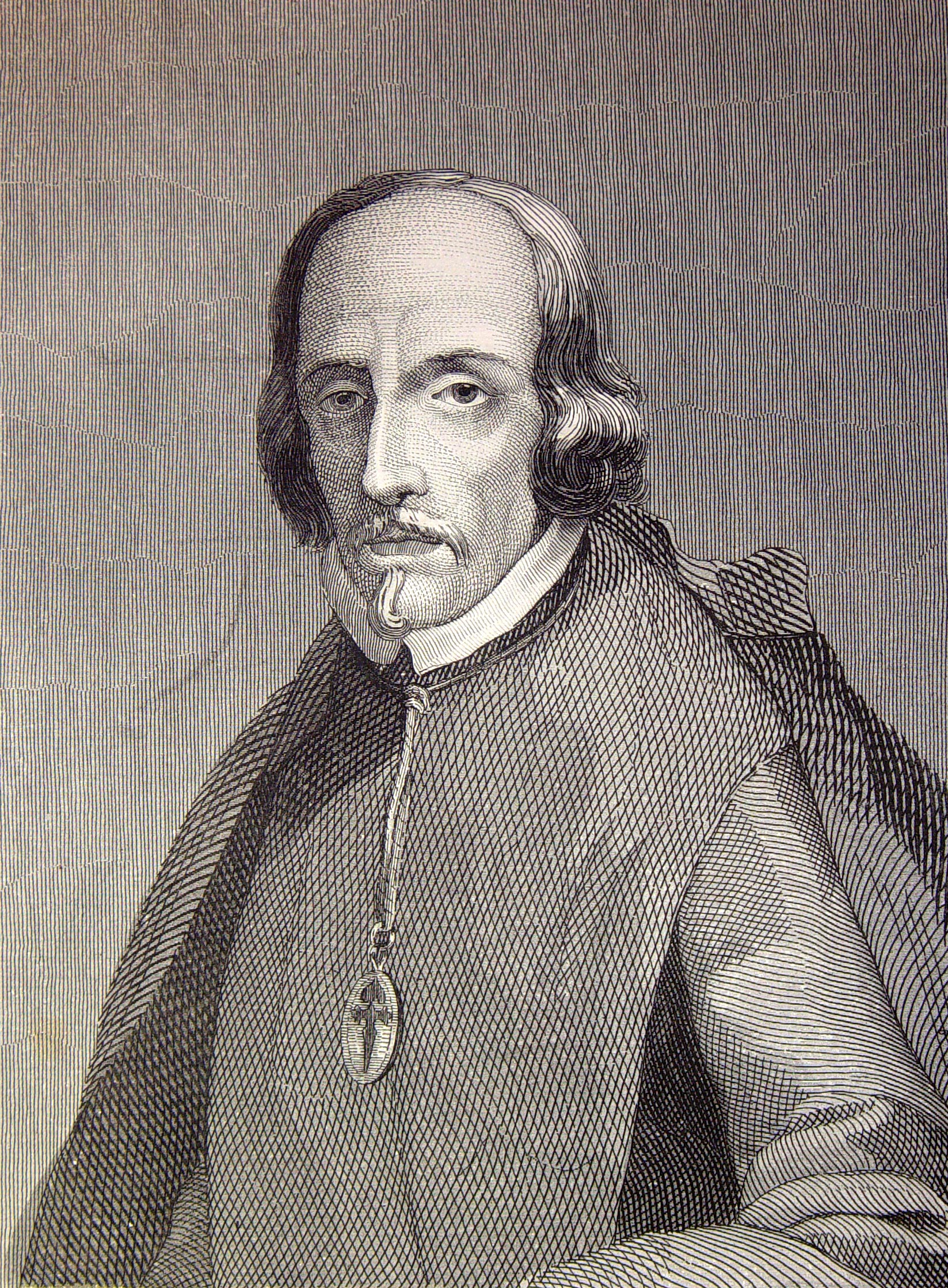
Calderón

Dreams vs. reality

The concept of life as a dream is an ancient one found in Hinduism and Greek philosophy (notably Heraclitus and the famous Platonic Allegory of the Cave), and is directly related to Descartes's dream argument. It has been explored by writers from Lope de Vega to Shakespeare. Key elements from the play may be derived from the Christian legend of Barlaam and Josaphat, which Lope de Vega had brought to the stage. This legend is itself inspired by the story of the early years of Siddhartha Gautama, which illustrates the Hindu–Buddhist concept of reality as illusion.

Father vs. son conflict

One of the major conflicts of the play is the opposition between king and prince, which parallels with the struggle of Uranus vs. Saturn or Saturn vs. Jupiter in classical mythology. This struggle is a typical representation of the opposition in baroque comedy between the values represented by a fatherly figure and those embodied by the son. An opposition which, in this case, may have biographical elements.

Honor

The theme of honor is significant to the character Rosaura. She feels she has been stripped of her honor, and her aim is to reclaim it. Rosaura feels that both she and her mother were subjected to the same fate. She pleads to Clotaldo about earning her honor back, which he denies and sends her to a nunnery.

Other motifs and themes

Motifs and themes derived from a number of traditions found in this drama include the labyrinth, the monster, free will vs. predestination, the four elements, original sin, pride and disillusionment.

== Analysis and interpretations ==
=== Rosaura subplot ===
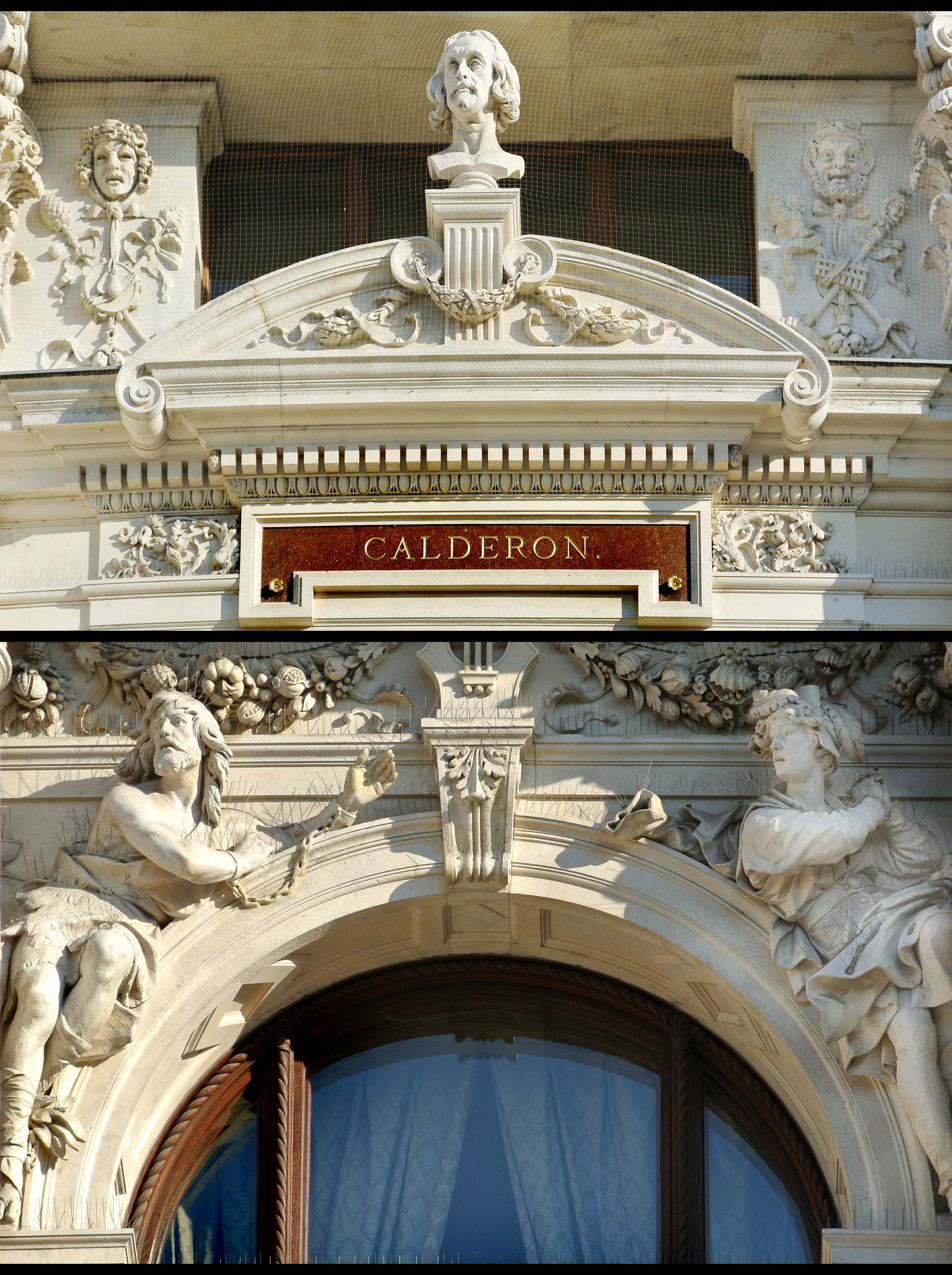
Part of a façade of Burgtheater in Vienna. Segismundo and Rosaura appear represented below Calderon (de la Barca).

The Rosaura subplot has been subjected to much criticism in the past as not belonging to the work. Marcelino Menéndez y Pelayo saw it as a strange and exotic plot, like a parasitical vine. Rosaura has also been dismissed as the simple stock character of the jilted woman. With the British School of Calderonistas, this attitude changed. A. E. Sloman explained how the main and secondary actions are linked. Others like E. M. Wilson and William M. Whitby consider Rosaura to be central to the work since she parallels Segismundo's actions and also serves as Segismundo's guide, leading him to a final conversion. For some Rosaura must be studied as part of a Platonic ascent on the part of the Prince. Others compare her first appearance, falling from a horse/hippogriff to the plot of Ariosto's Orlando furioso where Astolfo (the name of the character who deceives Rosaura in our play), also rides the hippogriff and witnesses a prophecy of the return of the mythical Golden Age. For Frederick de Armas, Rosaura hides a mythological mystery already utilized by Ariosto. When she goes to Court, she takes on the name of Astraea, the goddess of chastity and justice. Astraea was the last of the immortals to leave earth with the decline of the ages. Her return signals the return of a Golden Age. Many writers of the Renaissance and early modern periods used the figure of Astraea to praise the rulers of their times. It is possible that Rosaura (an anagram of auroras, "dawns") could represent the return of a Golden Age during the reign of Segismundo, a figure that represents King Philip IV of Spain.

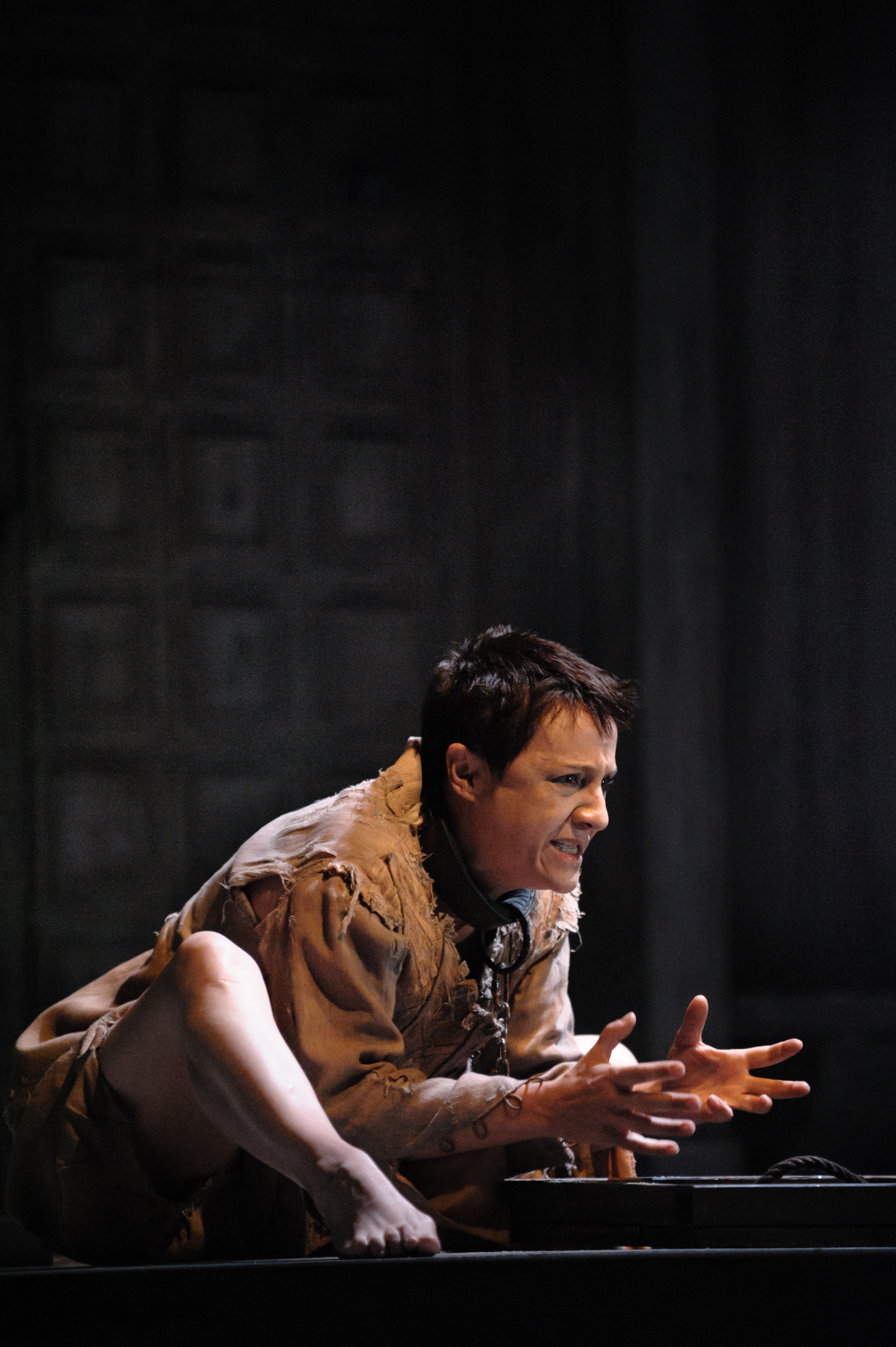
La vida es sueño, 35th Festival Internacional de Teatro Clásico de Almagro (International Festival of Classical Theatre, 2012).

=== Segismundo's conclusions ===
There have been many different interpretations of the play's ending, where Segismundo condemns the rebel soldier who freed him to life imprisonment in the tower. Some have suggested that this scene is ironic – that it raises questions about whether Segismundo will in fact be a just king. Others have pointed out that Calderón, who lived under the Spanish monarchy, could not have left the rebel soldier unpunished, because this would be an affront to royal authority.

It is worth considering that Segismundo's transformation in the course of the play is not simply a moral awakening, but a realization of his social role as the heir to the throne, and this role requires him to act as kings act. For some, the act of punishing the rebel soldier makes him a Machiavellian prince. Others argue that, while this action may seem unjust, it is in keeping with his new social status as the king. Daniel L. Heiple traces a long tradition of works where treason seems to be rewarded, but the traitor or rebel is subsequently punished.

It may well be that, rather than intending his audience to see this action as purely right or wrong, Calderón purposefully made it ambiguous, creating an interesting tension in the play that adds to its depth.

== Adaptations ==
=== Theatre ===
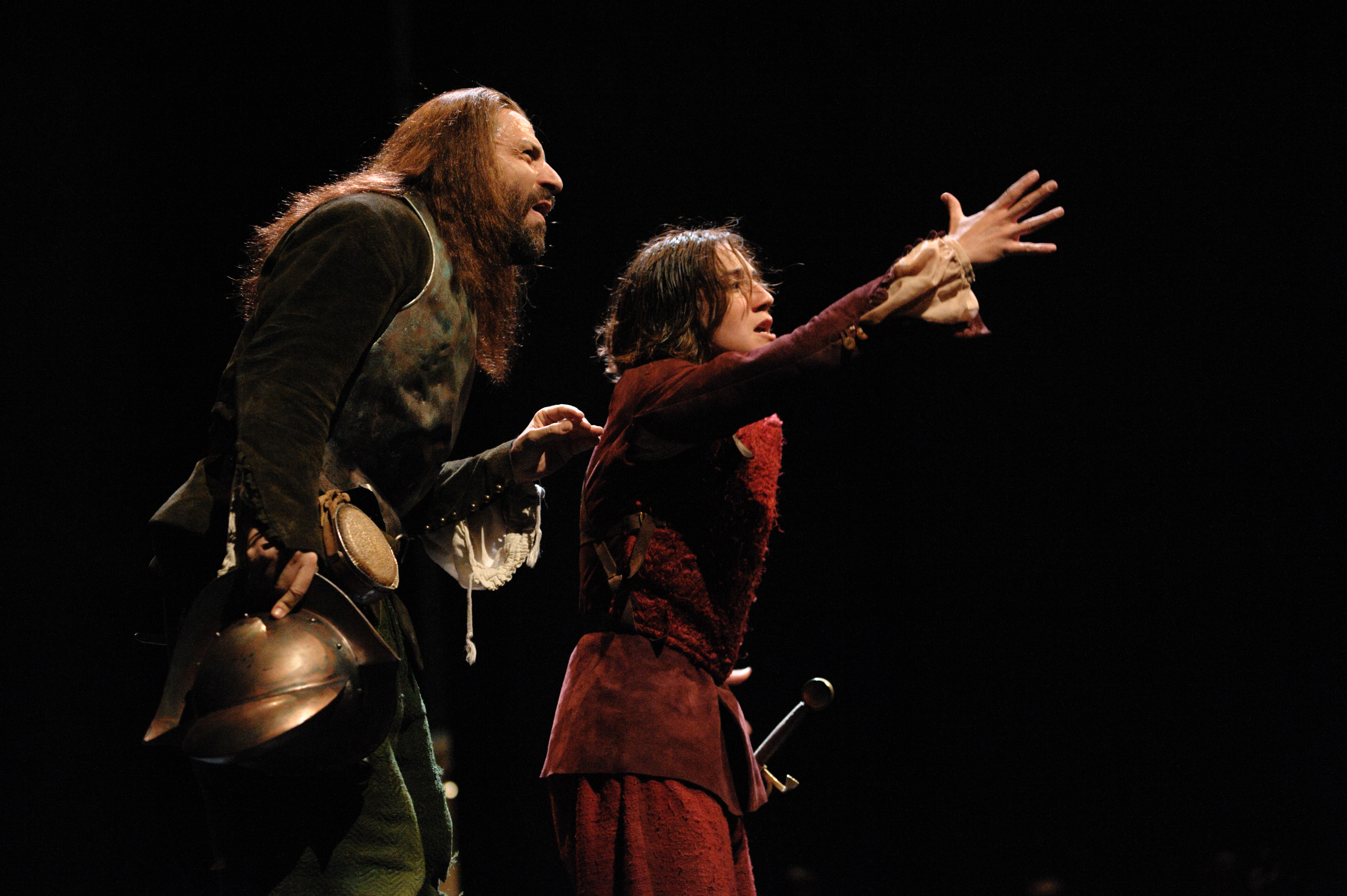
La vida es sueño, 35th Festival

- A Dutch adaptation, Het Leven is maer Droom, was performed in Brussels in 1647, and printed by Jan Mommaert.
- Sueño, a 1998 adaptation of Life is a Dream by Puerto Rican playwright at screenwriter José Rivera, was commissioned and produced by Hartford Stage Company.
- Helen Edmundson's adaptation of Life Is a Dream was produced at the Donmar Warehouse in 2009, starring BAFTA Award-winner Dominic West.
- Rosaura, a 2016 adaptation by Paula Rodríguez and Sandra Arpa which focuses on the principal female character in Calderon's play – showing how she fights against what life had done to her, as well as against the established order and the limits imposed on her
- Calderón’s Two Dreams was presented by the Magis Theatre Company in February 2017 at La Mama Experimental Theatre Club, with a new translation of Life is a Dream 1635 play by George Drance SJ, and presented on the same bill with the autosacramental Life is a Dream translated by Drance and Alfredo Galván.

=== Opera ===
- Life Is a Dream by Jonathan Dove (composer) and Alasdair Middleton (libretist); Directed by Graham Vick. Premiered by Birmingham Opera Company, Argyle Works, Birmingham, on 21 March 2012.
- Life Is a Dream by Lewis Spratlan (composer) and James Maraniss (librettist), premiered by the Santa Fe Opera on 24 July 2010.

=== Film ===
- 1960 Spanish film El príncipe encadenado by Luis Lucía is based on the play.
- Raúl Ruiz's 1987 film Life is a dream is a partial adaptation of Life Is a Dream (and was distributed under this title in its English-language subtitled version).
- 1997 Spanish film Abre Los Ojos by director Alejandro Amenábar and its American remake Vanilla Sky, directed by Cameron Crowe, released in 2001, explore similar perceptions of dream and reality from the point of view of an imprisoned protagonist.

=== Other media ===
- Popular song: Some of the latter lines from Act 2 are sampled in the Jumpstyle song "Que es la Vida" by Martillo Vago.
- Song: The title track of progressive metal band Haken's album Visions samples an English translation of a passage from the play.

== See also ==
- List of Calderón's plays in English translation
