= El médico de su honra =

17th Century Spanish play by Pedro Calderón de la Barca

- Original language: Spanish
- Written by: Pedro Calderón de la Barca
- Characters: Don Gutierre Alfonso Solís, nobleman of Seville; King Peter of Castile; Infante Henry II of Castile, brother of King Peter; Don Arias, nobleman in the service of Infante Henry; Don Diego, another nobleman in the service of Infante Henry; Coquín, lackey to Don Gutierre; Doña Mencía de Acuña, Don Gutierre’s wife; Doña Leonor, noblewoman; Jacinta, slave in the house of Don Gutierre; Inés, Doña Leonor’s maid; Teodora, Doña Mencía’s maid; Ludovico, bloodletter; An old man; Soldiers; Musicians
- Subject: Honor
- Genre: Spanish Golden Age Drama
- Setting: Kingdom of Castile

Premiere
- Date: 1637

El médico de su honra (English: The Surgeon of his Honour) is a Spanish language play by Pedro Calderón de la Barca. First published in 1637, it is a tragedy about a misunderstanding which leads to the honor killing of the protagonist's wife. The play is based on the work of the same name by Lope de Vega.

== Plot summary ==
=== Act 1 ===
The play opens as the Infante Enrique falls from his horse and loses consciousness. The King, Pedro, does not wish to be detained on his journey to court at Seville, and suggests that the infante's companions, Don Arias and Don Diego, take him to a nearby country house while he continues on to Seville. Arias criticizes the king for being cruel, but Diego cautions him to watch what he says. The two noblemen carry him to the country house, which is inhabited by Don Gutierre and his wife, Doña Mencía.

Mencía and her slave, Jacinta, receive them. Mencía is recognized as the infante's former lover by Arias, but she cautions him to keep quiet, telling him that her honor depends on it. She sends Jacinta to fetch perfumes and is left alone with Enrique and soliloquizes about her former love for him and the need for her to suppress her emotions to protect her honor. Enrique awakens and expresses his love for her. Mencía explains that she is now married and that they are in the house of her husband. Enrique, overcome by his emotions, demands that he and his companions leave at once, convinced that his fall was an omen of his impending death due to grief at his lover's marriage to another. Mencía explains that she never could have married Enrique, as her status was not high enough to marry an infante.

Don Gutierre, Mencía's husband, enters with his lackey Coquín and asks that Enrique honor his humble dwelling (compared to the palace) by staying there while he recovers. Enrique politely declines, saying he has a pressing need to leave quickly. Gutierre inquires as to the nature of this need, so Enrique reads a story about a friend who betrayed him in a matter of the heart, intended to be a message to Mencía explaining his pain at the news of her marriage. Mencía uses his metaphor in the made-up story to convey that she wishes to explain herself to him.

Diego returns and announces that a horse has been prepared for the infante. Gutierre offers him an exceptional mare from his own stables instead. Enrique accepts the gift and lets Mencía know that he will return to visit her. He leaves, along with his two attendants and Coquín. Mencía mentions her jealousy of Gutierre's former lover Leonor, and Gutierre reassures her that he no longer loves her. Mencía doesn't believe him and he leaves. Jacinta enters and convinces Mencía to tell her about her problems.

The next scene takes place at the king's court in Seville, where he is receiving petitions from his subjects. Doña Leonor and her maid, Inés, enter wearing cloaks to conceal their identities. After the king deals with several petitions, Leonor approaches him and explains that she is seeking justice on a matter of honor. The king sends everyone else away, and Leonor tells the story of how Don Gutierre courted her and proposed marriage, but broke off the engagement. She claims to have filed a lawsuit against him but lost due to favoritism towards Gutierre. She asks the king to order him to support her in a convent, which she sees as her only option as a dishonored woman. The king says that he wishes to hear Gutierre's side of the story, and suggests that she hide herself behind a screen and listen while he speaks with him. She hides and Coquín enters.

The king asks who he is, and Coquín explains that he is someone who makes people laugh. The king makes a wager with him: if Coquín makes him laugh, the king will pay him 100 gold coins, but if he can't, the king will have his teeth pulled. Coquín accepts the wager, mostly out of fear of the king's wrath should he refuse. He leaves and the court, including Don Gutierre, Don Diego, Don Arias, and Infante Enrique, enters. Gutierre approaches the king, who asks about what Leonor told him earlier. Gutierre denies having actually promised marriage and the judge's favoritism during the lawsuit. He hints that there is more to the story, and the king insists that he tell him, so that Leonor will hear what he has to say and can respond to it later.

Gutierre reveals that one evening he discovered an unknown man sneaking out from the balcony of Leonor's house, and felt he was no longer able to trust her. At this Leonor reveals herself and begins to explain what happened that evening, but Don Arias interrupts, saying that he feels he must be the one to explain. He says that there was another woman in the house that night, whom he had been courting with the intention of marriage, who has since died. He followed the woman into the house before Leonor could stop him, and when Gutierre approached she ordered him to flee. At the time he had thought she was married and that it was her husband returning home, so he did as she said. As he now knows the truth, he declares that he wishes to publicly defend her honor, and he and Gutierre draw their swords. This violates the law against drawing a weapon in the presence of the king, and the king orders them both arrested. Enrique decides that this will give him an opportunity to sneak off and see Mencía. Everyone leaves except for Leonor, who laments the loss of her honor, and curses Gutierre for causing it.

=== Act 2 ===
Jacinta agrees to let Enrique into the house to see Mencía, because Enrique offers her her freedom in exchange. Mencía is alarmed to see him, saying that he is violating the honor of herself and her husband by coming to visit her alone, but Enrique claims that he thought her contributions to his false story about his traitorous friend was an invitation. She expresses regret for having led him on, but begs him to leave her alone so that her honor will not be destroyed. As they argue, Gutierre and Coquín return home, and Mencía orders Enrique to hide in her bedroom until she can get a door open for him to escape out of. He hides, and Gutierre explains that the warden of the prison, a relative and friend, let him out temporarily to come see Mencía. Mencía calls Jacinta to help her prepare dinner for her husband, and they leave. Gutierre reminds Coquín that they must return to the prison before daylight. Coquín suggests that they not return, and Gutierre is infuriated at the suggestion that they betray the prison warden.

As they argue, Mencía calls for help, claiming to have found a thief hiding in her bedroom. Gutierre, Coquín, and Mencía go to investigate, and Mencía puts out the candle, allowing Jacinta to guide Enrique out of the house under the cover of darkness. Gutierre goes to search the room, and Jacinta asks her mistress why she didn't just tell Gutierre the truth. Mencía reveals that she feels her husband would not have believed that she was innocent. Gutierre returns, with a dagger he has found left by Enrique hidden under his cloak. He tells Mencía that they must return to the prison, and they embrace, which reveals the dagger. Alarmed, Mencía asks if he has the dagger to kill her, and protests that she is innocent of any offense. Gutierre lies and says that he pulled out the dagger while he was searching the house, for protection. Mencía tries to cover up her guilt by claiming that his absence makes her nervous and paranoid. Gutierre leaves, though he confesses that he has some suspicions about the way Mencía is acting.

The next scene occurs in Seville, where the king has just returned from making his nightly incognito rounds through the city. He and Don Diego encounter Coquín, whom the king challenges to try and win the wager. Coquín tells a joke about a eunuch with a moustache protector, but the king does not laugh. Enrique enters and asks that Don Arias be released. The king pardons both lawbreakers. He leaves, and after a conversation between Enrique and Coquín, Don Arias, Don Diego, and Don Gutierre enter. Gutierre compares the dagger that he found in Mencía's bedroom with the sword that Enrique is carrying.

Suspicious of her infidelity, Gutierre decides to set a trap for his wife. He returns home the following night, sneaking in through the garden. In the darkness he changes his voice so that Mencía does not recognise him, and when she calls him "My Prince", Gutierre realises that Mencía has been seeing Enrique at night in his absence. What he is not aware of however is that Mencía is not guilty of any wrongdoing with Enrique and she tried to dismiss him when he appeared at the house.

=== Act 3 ===
Sure that his wife has been unfaithful to him with the Prince, Gutierre appeals to the King and informs him that his honour is in jeopardy. The King confronts Enrique, hiding Gutierre behind a wall so that he himself may hear the Prince's side of the story. When Enrique confesses he loved Mencía, the King tries to get him to stop talking but he continues to incriminate himself in Gutierre's hearing. When the King attempts to hand over Enrique's dagger which Gutierre found in the house, his hand is cut accidentally in the exchange of hands. The King interprets the accident as an attack and accuses his brother of treachery.

Having fled the scene, to avoid further confrontation, Enrique makes plans to leave town. However Mencía fears this will arouse suspicion amongst her neighbours, the court and of course her husband, so she writes to him begging him not to leave lest her reputation be endangered. Gutierre finds the letter unfinished, with merely one ambiguous line written. More certain than ever of her infidelity, Gutierre then feels he has no choice but to become the "médico" (physician/surgeon) of his own honour, and makes plans to kill Mencía to restore his honour. He hires Ludovico, a bloodletter, whom he blindfolds on the way to the house so he will be unable to identify his surroundings and blame Gutierre. He threatens Ludovico's life unless he complies to kill Mencía by bleeding her to death. Under protest but given no choice under fear for his life, Ludovico lets her blood.

Once she has been drained of life, Gutierre takes Ludovico back out onto the street, intending to kill him anyway to tie up the final loose end. But Gutierre flees when he sees the King approaching in the street. Ludovico upon seeing the King informs him what has happened, and says he left a bloodied handprint on the door of the house so that he may identify it later. The King finds the house with the handprint, and knows it to be that of Gutierre. He admires how Gutierre has set about salvaging his honour in a discreet and private way. He decides to have Gutierre marry Leonor in order to repair her honour also, but Gutierre protests that it is too soon for him to remarry. The King overrides Gutierre's opinion, and the play ends with a dark exchange about how Gutierre has been the "médico" of his honour once, and that Leonor should take heed and be careful, for he could easily do so again should he feel he has cause.

== See also ==
- List of Calderón's plays in English translation
