= Les Danaïdes =

Opera by Antonio Salieri

- Tragédie lyrique by Antonio Salieri
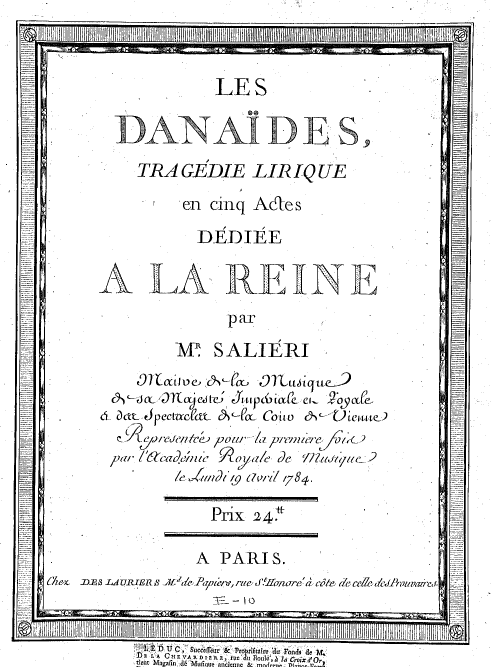
- Title page of the score, 1784
- Librettist: François-Louis Gand Le Bland Du Roullet; Louis-Théodore de Tschudi
- Language: French
- Premiere: 26 April 1784; Académie Royale de Musique, Paris

Les Danaïdes is an opera by Antonio Salieri, in five acts: more specifically, it is a tragédie lyrique. The opera was set to a libretto by François-Louis Gand Le Bland Du Roullet and Louis-Théodore de Tschudi, who in turn adapted the work of Ranieri de' Calzabigi (without permission). Calzabigi originally wrote the libretto of Les Danaïdes for Christoph Willibald Gluck, but the aged composer, who had just experienced a stroke, was unable to meet the Opéra's schedule and so asked Salieri to take it over. The plot of the opera is based on Greek tragedy and revolves around the deeds of the mythological characters Danaus and Hypermnestra.

== History ==
Emperor Joseph II assured that Salieri wrote the music "almost under the dictée of Gluck," in a letter (dated 31 March 1783) to Count Mercy-Argenteau, the Austrian ambassador in Paris. Then Mercy told the directors of the Opéra that Gluck had composed the first two acts, and Salieri supplied the third act's music (Mercy did not realize the opera was in five acts). Even when the libretto was published, Gluck and Salieri shared billing as the composers.

Though flattered, Gluck was not foolish enough to risk too close an association with young Salieri's work and diplomatically informed the press: "The music of Danaïdes is completely by Salieri, my only part in it having been to make suggestions which he willingly accepted." Gluck, who had been devastated by the failure of his last Paris opera, Echo et Narcisse, was concerned that Les Danaïdes would suffer a similar fate. He wrote to Roullet the same day that the opera premiered, crediting Salieri with the entire work, and the press noted this confession. Salieri made a positive twist on Gluck’s statement, claiming that he was "led by [Gluck’s] wisdom and enlightened by his genius".

== Orchestration ==
Les Danaïdes was orchestrated for 2 traversos, 2 oboes, 2 clarinets, 2 bassoons, 2 horns, 2 trumpets, 3 trombones, first violins, second violins, violas, cellos, double-basses, timpani and harpsichord.

== Roles ==
Roles
Cast	Voice type	Premiere, 26 April 1784 (Conductor: - )
Hypermnestre	soprano	Antoinette-Cécile de Saint-Huberty
Danaüs	bass-baritone	Henri Larrivée
Lyncée	tenor	Étienne Lainez
Pélagus, Commanding Officer of Danaüs	bass	Jean-Pierre Moreau
Plancippe, sister of Hypermnestre	soprano	
Three officers	2 tenors and a bass	Dufresny (1st officer), Jean-Joseph Rousseau (2nd officer), Louis-Claude-Armand Chardin, "Chardiny" (3rd officer)

== Synopsis ==
Act I
Danaus and his fifty daughters, the Danaïdes, vow loyalty to their enemy Aegyptus, Danaus's brother. Aegyptus dies and is succeeded by his eldest son, Lynceus (Lyncée). He and his brothers each agree to marry one of the Danaïdes; Danaus instructs his daughters to take revenge by killing their husbands on their wedding night.
Act II
Lynceus's wife Hypermnestra (Hypermnestre) is alone in refusing to obey her father's order, even after Danaus confronts her with the prophecy that he will be murdered himself if she fails to satisfy his lust for vengeance.
Act III
After the wedding ceremony, Hypermnestra manages to escape with Lynceus, just as his brothers are being killed.
Act IV
Danaus is enraged when news of Lynceus's escape reaches him, but he is distracted from his anger when Lynceus storms the city, killing all fifty of the Danaïdes except Hypermnestra and burning the palace to the ground.
Act V
The Danaïdes are sent to Hades where their father is seen chained to a rock, his entrails being torn from him by a vulture. The Furies promise an eternity of suffering.

== Music ==
Salieri's use of trombones to delineate infernal moments in the drama has often been viewed of as a precedent for Mozart's similar orchestration in Don Giovanni. Stylistically, Salieri combined the direct simplicity of Gluck's innovations with the concern for melody of Italian composers, though the frequent use of chorus owes much to French traditions, as did the munificent staging, which much impressed Berlioz.

Hypermnestra's soprano, which dominates the opera in a manner that anticipates the soprano-centered opera of Luigi Cherubini and Gaspare Spontini, is technically well written, and although Salieri didn't develop the basic material beyond the formulas inherited from Gluck, his music is more melodic and lyrical. The fine soprano role, the tremendously grim finale, and the brevity of Les Danaïdes (ten minutes under two hours) have ensured that the opera has made it onto CD.

Salieri was certainly aware of his role in continuing the Gluckian tradition of the tragédie lyrique, with the attention to the relationship between text and music. The orchestral recitatives, choruses, and ballets also follow the model for French opera supplied by Gluck. Furthermore, the music itself is infused with the 'noble simplicity' that characterizes the older composer's reform operas.

At the same time, Les Danaïdes marked a progression from number opera to the dramatically more consequent through-composed scenic opera. A lyricism associated with Niccolò Piccinni and Antonio Sacchini, who also composed for Paris, can also be heard in Les Danaïdes.

== Reception ==
The opera was first performed at the Académie Royale de Musique (Paris Opéra) on 26 April 1784 and was, at the time, so great a success that the theatre commissioned two more works from Salieri. It was subsequently staged by the Paris Opéra over 120 times up to the 1820s, and in the rest of Europe, as well, in no less than four different editions, some of which reduced to four acts instead of the five ones usual at the Opéra, and translated into different languages such as German.

Gaspare Spontini directed the fourth edition of the opera on 22 October 1817 for the Académie Royale de Musique, in the Salle Montansier of the rue Richelieu, with the addition of a "Gran Bacchanale" written by himself and of other music by Louis-Luc Loiseau de Persuis, Henri François Berton and Ferdinando Paër. It must have been a revival of this edition (or of a similar one) that delighted, some years later, shortly after his arrival in Paris, the young Berlioz, who would later reveal that he had been, at the same time, exceptionally "excited and disturbed" by Spontini's additions.

== Recordings ==
- Jean-Philippe Lafont, Maria Trabucco, Montserrat Caballé, Andrea Martin, Carlo Tuand, et al. Gianluigi Gelmetti cond., Rome RAI Orchestra. 2 CDs, ADD, recorded 1983, Dynamic, 26 July 2005
- Sophie Marin-Degor, Hans Christoph Begemann, Christoph Genz, Kirsten Blaise, Wolfgang Frisch, Sven Jüttner, Daniel Sütö, Jürgen Deppert. Michael Hofstetter cond., Jan Hoffmann chorus master, choir and orchestra of the Ludwigsburger Schlossfestspiele. 2 CDs, DDD, (Oehms, 2007)
- Margaret Marshall, Dimitri Kavrakos, Raul Giménez, Clarry Bartha, Andrea Martin, Enrico Cossutta. Gianluigi Gelmetti cond., Stuttgart Radio Symphony Orchestra & Chorus. 2 CDs, EMI, 1990.
- Judith van Wanroij, Philippe Talbot, Thasis Christoyannis, Les Talens Lyriques conducted by Christophe Rousset, Les Chantres du centre de musique baroque de Versailles, 2 CDs, Palazzetto Bru Zane, Centre de Musique Romantique Francaise, recorded 2015
- The Overture has been recorded by the Slovak Radio Symphony Orchestra (Bratislava) conducted by Michael Dittrich. Naxos, cat. no. 8.554838, barcode 0636943483824

== Sources ==
- Salvatore Caruselli (ed), Grande enciclopedia della musica lirica, vol. 4, Longanesi &C. Periodici S.p.A., Roma
- Sadie, Stanley (ed.), "The New Grove Dictionary of Opera", vol. 4 Oxford University Press, London, 1992, ISBN 978-0-19-522186-2 (John A. Rice: "Les Danaïdes", Grove Music Online ed L. Macy (accessed 29 May 2007), grovemusic.com, subscription access.)
- Georgia Kondyli, "La permeabilite des genres lyriques a la fin du 18e siecle: Les Danaides d'Antonio Salieri", these inedite, Universite Francois Rabelais de Tours, Dir Laurine Quetin, soutenue Juin 2005.
- Georgia Kondyli, Les Danaïdes ou les migrations d'un mythe sur la scène au 18 siècle. Musicorum, 2004:
- Les Danaïdes de Salieri licida.over-blog.com
