= Christina Gerstberger =

German operatic soprano (born 1976)

- Born: 1976 (age 48–49); Nuremberg, Germany
- Education: Musikhochschule Detmold
- Occupation: Operatic soprano
- Organizations: Staatstheater am Gärtnerplatz; Freies Landestheater Bayern
- Awards: Bundeswettbewerb Gesang

Christina Gerstberger (born 1976) is a German operatic soprano. The award-winning singer has worked freelance and as a member of theatres such as the Staatstheater am Gärtnerplatz in Munich, often in roles by Mozart such as Susanna. She has performed at international festivals such as the Ludwigsburger Schlossfestspiele, and in concert and recordings.

== Career ==
Born in Nuremberg, she finished gymnasium with the Abitur in 1995, specializing in music. The same year, she was awarded second prize in the Bavarian competition of Jugend musiziert. In 1996 she won second prize in the competition of the Deutscher Tonkünstlerverband in North Rhine-Westphalia. She studied voice from 1996 to 2000 at the Musikhochschule Detmold, with Ingeborg Ruß among others. She further studied operatic performance at the Musikhochschule Würzburg with Christel Gernot-Heindl. In 1998, she received second prize of the Robert-Saar-Wettbewerb. The same year, she won first prize at both the regional competition of North Rhine-Westphalia and the national competition of the Bundeswettbewerb Gesang in Berlin. She had a scholarship of the Walter-Kaminsky-Stiftung in Munich and of the Hans-und-Eugenia-Jütting-Stiftung in Stendal that year. In 2003, she was awarded a scholarship of the Richard-Wagner-Verband.

Gerstberger was a member of the ensemble of the Anhaltisches Theater in Dessau from 2000 to 2005. She appeared there as Luise in Kurt Weill's Die Bürgschaft in 2002. She worked freelance for two years, appearing as a guest at Frankfurt Opera, the Theater Dortmund and the Theater Lucerne, among others. From 2007 to 2012, she had been a member of the Staatstheater am Gärtnerplatz in Munich, where she performed as the Princess in Cesar Bresgen's children's opera Der Mann im Mond, as Susanna in Mozart's Die Hochzeit des Figaro, as Zerline in Auber's Fra Diavolo, and as Gretel in Humperdinck's Hänsel und Gretel, among others. From 2015, she has been a member of the Freies Landestheater Bayern, where she appeared as Pamina in Mozart's Die Zauberflöte, as Ännchen in Weber's Der Freischütz, as Anna Reich in Nicolai's Die lustigen Weiber von Windsor, and as Micaela in Bizet's Carmen, among others.

Gerstberger has also appeared in concert, Lied and oratorio. She made concert tours in France with pianist Jörg Demus in 1999 and 2002. In 2008, she recorded the role of Lisida in the premiere of E. T. A. Hoffmann's Liebe und Eifersucht in a performance of the Ludwigsburger Schlossfestspiele, conducted by Michael Hofstetter. In 2018, she sang the soprano solo in Mozart's Requiem in St. Anna im Lehel in Munich, conducted by Angelika Tasler.
