= Kurganov =

Kurganov is a surname. Notable people with the surname include:

- Daniel Kurganov (born 1986), Belarusian-American violinist and educator
- Igor Kurganov (born 1988), Russian-born German poker player
