= Sybille Specht =

German opera singer (born 1970)

- Born: 12 October 1970 (age 54); Mannheim, West Germany
- Other names: Sybille Philippin
- Education: Hochschule für Musik Carl Maria von Weber; Indiana School of Music
- Occupations: Operatic mezzo-soprano; Choral conductor; Voice teacher
- Organizations: Theater Bremen; Staatstheater am Gärtnerplatz
- Website: www.sybillespecht.com

Sybille Specht, also Sybille Philippin, (born 12 October 1970) is a German operatic mezzo-soprano. She was a member of the Theater Bremen and the Staatstheater am Gärtnerplatz in Munich and has appeared internationally. Since 2010 she has worked freelance, also as a choral conductor and voice teacher.

== Career ==
Born in Mannheim, Specht grew up in Denmark, Bavaria, and Oldenburg. She took piano and violin lessons as a child. She studied at the Hochschule für Musik Carl Maria von Weber with Helga Köhler-Wellner, graduating with distinction in 1999. She studied further, on a scholarship from the German Academic Exchange Service, at the Indiana School of Music in Bloomington with Costanza Cuccaro. She took master classes with Elisabeth Schwarzkopf, Grace Bumbry, Carlo Bergonzi and Elio Battaglia, among others.

From 2001 to 2007, Specht was a member of the Theater Bremen. She appeared in roles such as Eliza Doolittle in Loewe's musical My Fair Lady, Rosina in Rossini's Der Barbier von Sevilla, Flora in Verdi's La Traviata, Ida in Die Fledermaus by Johann Strauss, and the Composer in Ariadne auf Naxos by Richard Strauss.

From the 2007/08 season to 2010, she was a member of the Staatstheater am Gärtnerplatz in Munich, where her roles included the Second Lady in Mozart's Die Zauberflöte, Giovanni in Suppé's Boccaccio, the Weaver in Das Märchen vom Zaren Saltan, Hänsel in Hänsel und Gretel, and La Belle in the chamber opera Die Schöne und das Biest by Philip Glass in its first production in Munich. She took part, in the role of Nisa, in the 2008 world premiere of E. T. A. Hoffmann's Liebe und Eifersucht, which was first shown at the Ludwigsburg Festival where it was recorded, receiving international attention. Her roles also include Sextus in Mozart's Idomeneo, Cherubino in Die Hochzeit des Figaro, Dorabella in Così fan tutte, and Mélisande in Debussy's Pelléas et Mélisande.

She is also active in Lied and concert, including performances at the Moscow Philharmonie, the Gewandhaus in Leipzig, and in Santiago, Chile. She is a member of the vocal ensemble Stimmkunst, conducted by Kay Johannsen. She has also worked as a choral conductor and a voice teacher.
