= Ingeborg Ruß =

German contralto and voice teacher

- Born: Germany
- Occupations: Operatic contralto; Academic voice teacher
- Organizations: Musikhochschule Würzburg; Musikhochschule Detmold

Ingeborg Ruß was a German contralto, focused on concert singing, and an academic voice teacher.

She record compositions by Johann Sebastian Bach, including Bach cantatas such as Singet dem Herrn ein neues Lied, BWV 190, with the Windsbacher Knabenchor conducted by Hans Thamm, alongside Teresa Żylis-Gara, Peter Schreier and Franz Crass. In 1967, she recorded his short masses with the Gächinger Kantorei and the Bach-Collegium Stuttgart conducted by Helmuth Rilling, alongside Elisabeth Speiser, John van Kesteren, Gerhard Faulstich and Jakob Stämpfli. She recorded in 1979 his St John Passion with the Amadeus Choir and Amadeus Orchestra conducted by Karl-Friedrich Beringer, alongside Alejandro Ramírez as the Evangelist, Michel Brodard as the vox Christi, Gerda Hagner, Boldizsár Keönch and Manfred Volz, and his Christmas Oratorio with the Windsbacher Knabenchor conducted by Beringer.

She was an academic voice teacher, at the Nuremberg Conservatory, the Musikhochschule in Würzburg, finally from 1983 to 2002, at the Musikhochschule Detmold. Among her students are Christina Gerstberger and Petra Schmidt.
