= Mungonzazal Janshindulam =

Mongolian musical artist

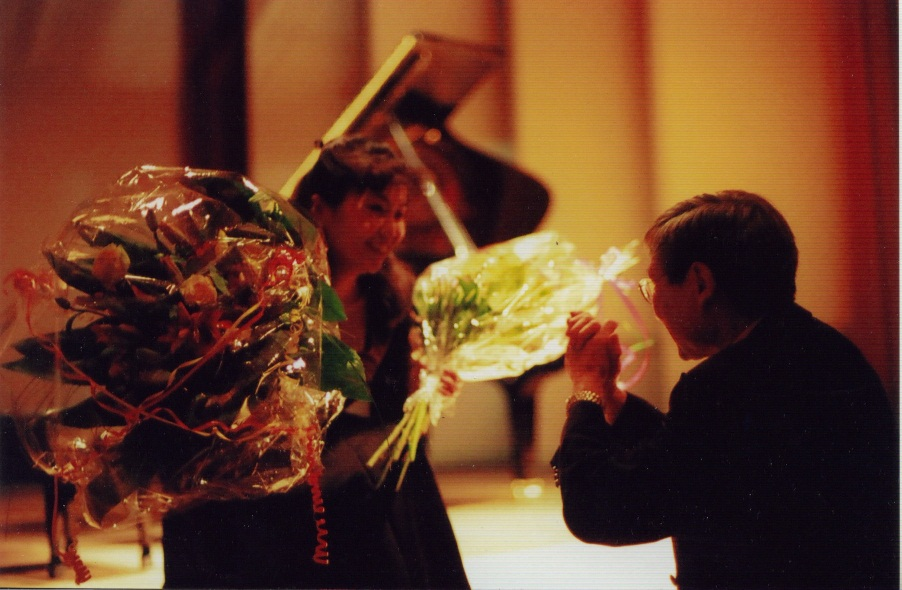
- Mungo Janshindulam (left) at the Konzerthaus Berlin in 2001

Background information
- Birth name: Янжиндуламын Мөнгөнцацал
- Born: November 28, 1972
- Origin: Ulaanbaatar, Mongolia
- Died: November 7, 2007 (aged 34); Berlin, Germany
- Occupation(s): Pianist, music teacher
- Instrument: piano

Mungonzazal Janshindulam (Mongolian: Янжиндуламын Мөнгөнцацал Yanjindulamyn Möngöntsatsal; 1972–2007), also known as "Mungo", was a Mongolian pianist and music teacher who lived and taught until her death in Düsseldorf and Dortmund, Germany. She was the first Mongolian pianist to have widespread European fame and won multiple piano competition awards. It is unknown how she died.

== Life ==
As a young child, Mungo already showed a huge interest in music, particularly in playing the piano. At eight years of age, her mother brought her to the music and choreography school in Ulan Bator so she could learn. Her early recitals included major Mongolian piano concertos at theatres and participated in local operas. In school, she scored very well in mathematics and Russian. She graduated with honors from the school of music and choreography.

In recognition of her outstanding academic performance, she had the opportunity to attend the 12th World Festival of Youth and Students in 1985 in Moscow, Russia. At age 16, she was accepted into the Gnessin State Musical College in Moscow to study the piano.

In 1993 she moved to Germany to study with Professor Richard Braun in the Dortmund Department of the Hochschule für Musik Detmold, where she graduated in 1997. That same year, she continued her musical studies at the Musikhochschule Münster with Professor Weichert, where she graduated in 2000 with honors. At the same time she began working as a teaching assistant for Professor Schmidt in a singing class at the Hochschule für Musik Detmold. In addition, she attended master classes in Japan, Spain, and many other European countries.

In October 1996 she became the first Mongolian pianist to receive first prize at the 9th chamber music competition during the Rassegna Internazionale Pescara Musica in Pescara, Italy. Afterwards, her highly playful skill has been praised in the press. Aside from numerous concerts as either soloist or accompanist, she made notable appearances in 1999 and 2001 at the Konzerthaus Berlin in Berlin.

From 1999 to 2003 she was a teaching assistant at the Musikhochschule in Dortmund and an accompanist for the Madrigal Choir at the University of Münster. From 1999 to her death in 2007, she worked as a piano teacher and music teacher at the private Institut für Musikalische Bildung (IMB) in Dortmund. From 2002 to 2005 she continued studying at the Hochschule für Musik Detmold. In 2002 she co-founded of the well-known TrioMusarto. In 2006, she made her final appearance with TrioMusarto.

== Legacy ==
In honor of the pianist, Mungonzazal's family established the Mungonzazal-Piano-Stiftung (Mungonzazal Piano Foundation) in the spring of 2008. The Foundation supports general charity in addition to the musical education of musically inclined individuals.

On 28 November (Mungonzazal's birthday) every other year, the Foundation organizes a chamber music competition, the first of which was held in Mongolia in 2008. Over 50 Mongolian music students and students participated in the premiere competition. This competition awarded nine students with certificates for first, second and third places. Following the competition, the participants were presented with a Mungonzazal tribute gala concert in Ulaanbaatar. The progress of competition and the concert was nationally broadcast on radio and television. In 2010, the competition was called "Mungo" and took place once again in Mongolia.

== Discography ==
=== 2001 ===
- Mozart: Sonate C-Dur KV 330(300h)
- Schumann: Davidsbündlertänze op.6

=== 2004 (TrioMusarto) ===
- Beethoven: Trio c-moll op.1 Nr.3
- Brahms: Trio C-Dur op.87
- Gerigk: Derwischrequiem
