= Daniel Kurganov =

American violinist and educator (born 1986)

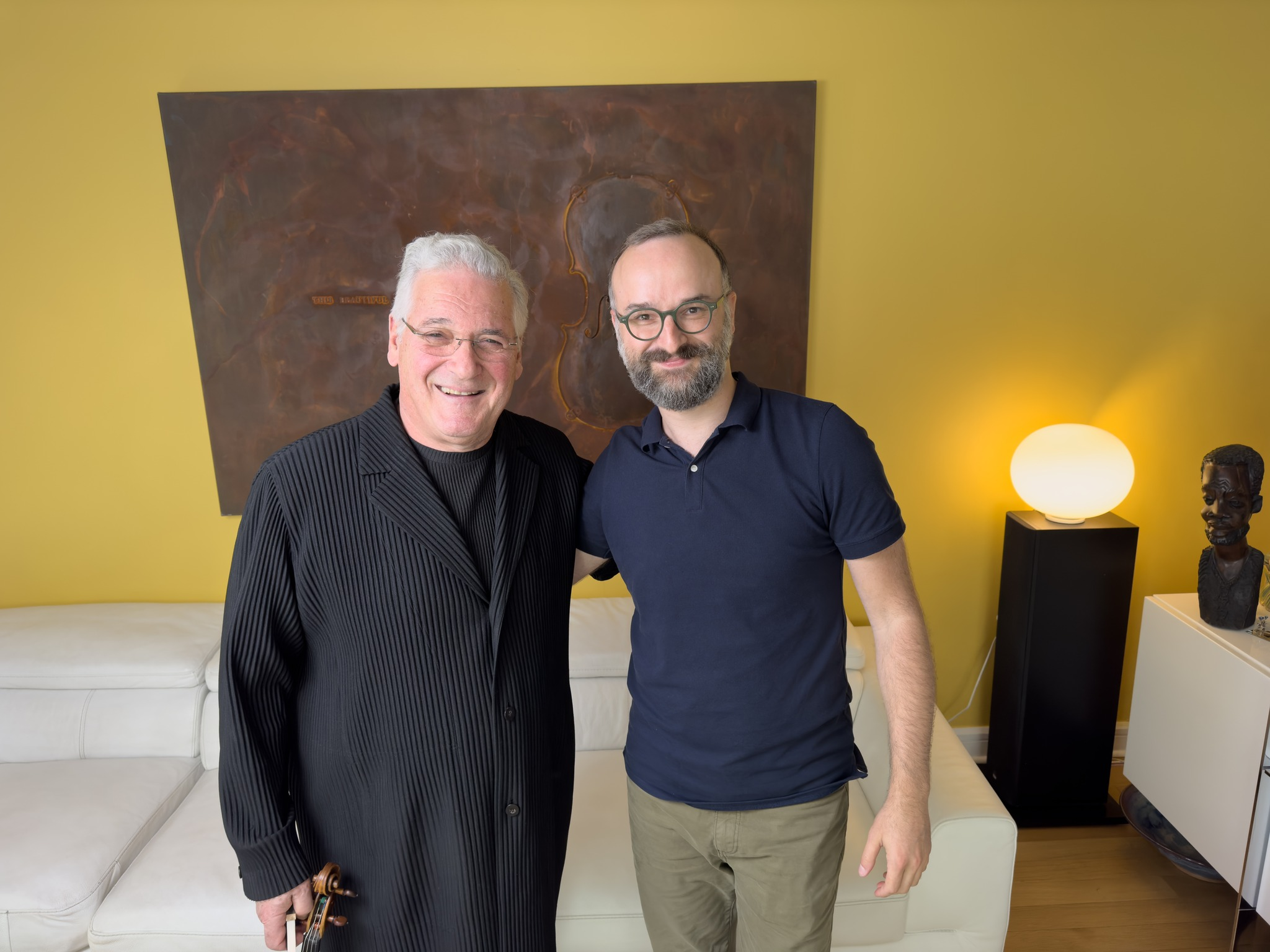
- Kurganov (right), with Pinchas Zukerman

Background information
- Born: November 29, 1986 (age 39); Minsk, Soviet Union (now Belarus)
- Origin: Chicago, Illinois, United States
- Genres: Classical
- Occupations: Violinist, music educator
- Instrument: Violin
- Years active: 2004–present
- Labels: Spice Classics, Orchid Classics, Hänssler Classics
- Website: www.kurganov.org

Daniel Kurganov (born November 29, 1986) is a Belarusian-American concert violinist and music educator. He began formal violin training at the age of 16. He has performed across the United States, Europe, and Japan, recorded several albums with pianist Constantine Finehouse, and maintains a YouTube channel with 94,600 subscribers.

== Early life and education ==
Kurganov was born in Minsk, then part of the Soviet Union (now Belarus), to a Jewish family, and immigrated to the United States with his family as a toddler, settling near Chicago. Initially studying piano as a child, he later switched to guitar in his early teens before commencing violin studies at age 16 under Alla Danichkina. He joined his high school orchestra and studied with violinists Ilya Kaler and Olga Kaler in Chicago.

He pursued further education at the Zurich University of the Arts in Switzerland, studying under Rudolf Koelman, a protégé of Jascha Heifetz. Kurganov also received instruction from Desirée Ruhstrat and Alexander Belavsky and is an alumnus of the Keshet Eilon International Mastercourse in Israel.

== Career ==
=== Performing ===
Kurganov performs as a soloist, chamber musician, and orchestral guest artist in venues across the United States, Europe, and Japan. He is a founding member of the Kurganov–Finehouse Duo, specializing in Romantic-era sonatas, and the Aegis Piano Trio. He has toured Japan with the Kurofune Ensemble, which he founded to blend classical and modern Japanese arts.

He collaborated with composer Stephanie Ann Boyd, performing her work "Aurora" during a tour with Finehouse in 2022. In 2011, He was invited to participate in the Violins of Hope project in Sion, Switzerland, where he performed on a violin rescued from the Auschwitz concentration camp. Other notable appearances include concerts at Merkin Hall, Bargemusic, the Museum of Fine Arts, Boston, and the Harvard Musical Association.

=== Teaching ===
Kurganov founded the Boston Violin Intensive in 2018. He has conducted masterclasses at institutions including the Boston Conservatory, the University of Maryland, and Musikhochschule Münster. Kurganov maintains a YouTube channel with instructional videos.

He regularly contributes articles to publications such as The Strad, where he was voted Best of The Strad 2021, and the Boston Musical Intelligencer. He has partnered with the music education platform Tonebase and served as a Featured Artist-Teacher from 2022 to 2025, producing educational content with Pinchas Zukerman, Seymour Bernstein, Marc-André Hamelin and Ron Carter.

== Musical style ==
Music critic Jed Distler, reviewing Kurganov's Brahms recording, notes: "Kurganov employs vibrato judiciously, and on occasion sneaks in just a hint of upward portamento à la Kreisler or Elman when reiterating a motive."

== Discography ==
Selected discography
Title	Year	Collaborator(s)	Label	Notes
Between the Notes	2018	Constantine Finehouse	Spice Classics	Includes works by Brahms, Prokofiev, Tchaikovsky, and a Gershwin arrangement by Heifetz
Rhythm and the Borrowed Past	2021	Constantine Finehouse	Orchid Classics	Features pieces by Lera Auerbach, Richard Beaudoin, Messiaen, and Cage
Brahms Violin Sonatas	2023	Constantine Finehouse	Hänssler Classics	Brahms's three violin sonatas, recorded on a 1706 Guarneri violin; rated 10/10 by Classics Today
