= Christina Brabetz =

South African-German violinist

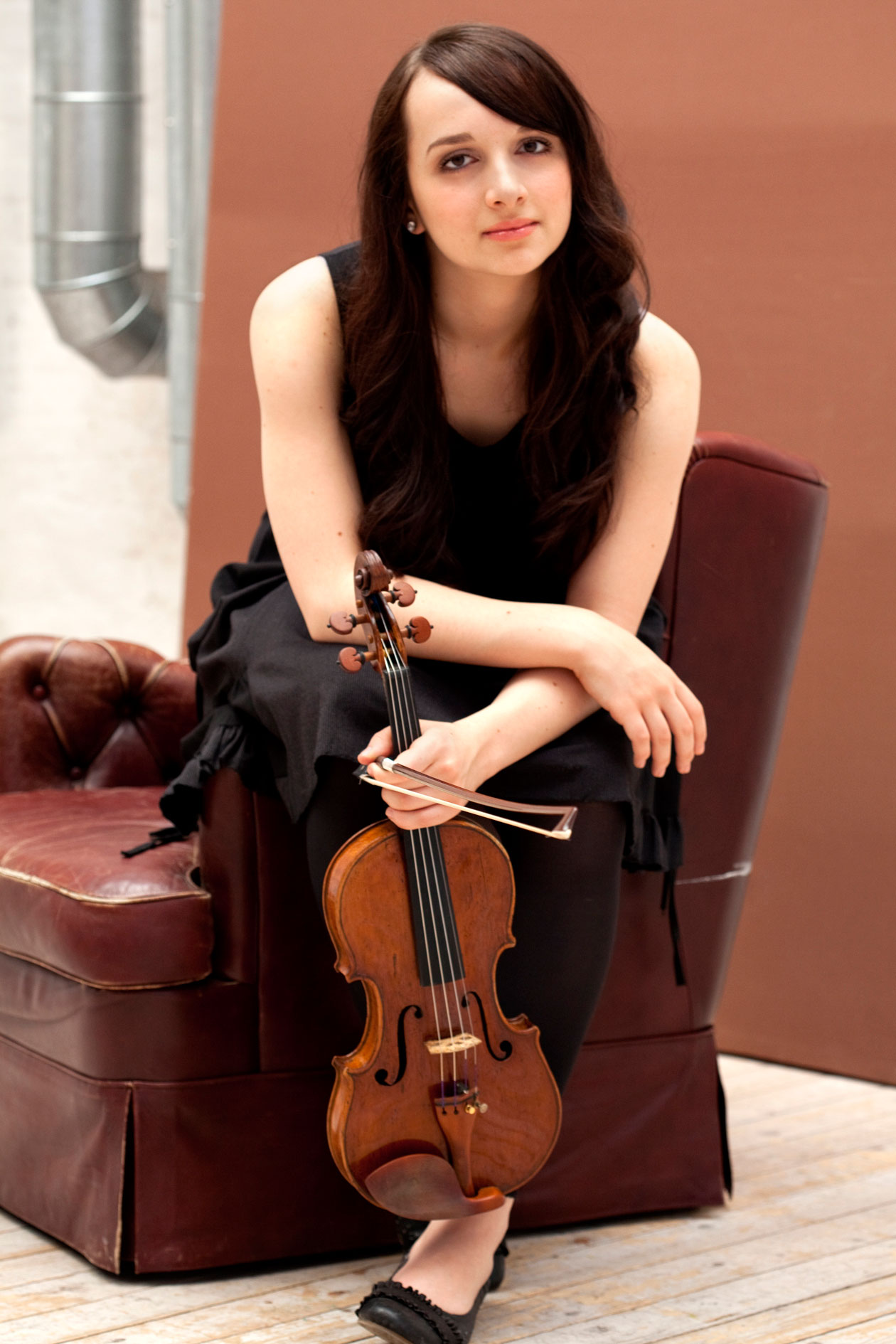

Christina Brabetz (* born 8 October 1993 in Windhoek, Namibia) is a South African-German violinist.

== Biography ==
Christina Brabetz, born in 1993, attended the German School in Cape Town and won her first musical awards in local and national competitions and was soon acclaimed as the „most promising candidate“. At the early age of eleven she was able to demonstrate her virtuosity by playing at the famous „Hugo Landbrechts Concert Festival“. Two years later she was admitted to the University of Music Detmold to study with Prof. Thomas Christian. The peak of her career up to now was to win the highly remunerated TONALi GRAND PRIX, which led to a performance of Mendelssohns Violin Concerto with Kurt Masur as conductor and engagements at the Festspiele Mecklenburg-Vorpommern, the BASF concerts and other music festivals.

== Instrument ==
Christina Brabetz plays on a violin of Paolo Antonio Testore from 1860.

== Prizes and honors ==
- 2004 Winner of Junior String section and most promising candidate at Sanlam National Music Competition
- 2005 Winner of the silver medal at the Sanlam National Music Competition
- 2003-2006 Winner of several Gold awards at the South African Eisteddfodds
- 2010 Winner of the TONALi Grand Prix in Hamburg
- 2012 Special Award from Nordrhein-Westfalen for young artists
