= Music schools in Germany =

Music schools in Germany cater to pupils from an early age up to postgraduate students. They exist within and outside the formal education system.

== Musikschulen ==
Public Music Schools are foundations for the musical education of children, adolescents and adults. They are usually in public ownership. They supplement rather than replacing music instruction in school. Public Music Schools can be found in most cities and towns. There were 914 public music schools in Germany as of January 1, 2009. Private Music Schools also exist, such as the "Musikschule Fröhlich" and the "Yamaha Schools of Music".

== Musikgymnasium ==
A Music Gymnasium is a secondary school designed to prepare children for studies in music. They can be day or boarding schools. Full-time music education at a Musikgymnasium can begin as early as 10 years of age. The curriculum includes subjects such as Rhythm, Music Theory, Ear Training, Composition. Students normally study two musical instruments including piano. In some cases, such as the Sächsisches Landesgymnasium für Musik "Carl Maria von Weber" in Dresden, the Musikgymnasium Belvedere Weimar in Weimar, and the Musikgymnasium Carl Philipp Emanuel Bach in Berlin, a Music Gymnasium can work closely with a Hochschule or Conservatory, where the pupils receive their main instrumental and vocal instruction.

== Musikhochschulen and Conservatories ==
Prior to the introduction of Musikhochschulen, Germany had a long tradition of Conservatories. The famous ones were founded in the 19th century: Leipzig (1843), Munich (1846), Berlin (1850), Köln (1850), Dresden (1856), Stuttgart (1857), Bremen (1873) and Frankfurt (1878). Some of these, such as the Hoch Conservatory in Frankfurt, still exist today as Conservatories (with the status of a Musikakademie) offering BMus degree programs in music. They provide musical education in a three-tier system with the newer Musikhochschule as well as the Musikschule.

Today, Germany has 24 Musikhochschulen which carry out professional music training. These institutions have university status and are financed by the Bundesländer (states). The range of courses covers all musical disciplines including composition, music theory, conducting, performance (voice & instruments), musicology and music education.

A number of Musikhochschulen have a Hochbegabtenzentrum (Pre-college departments for highly gifted students) allowing students to receive instrumental lessons and music theory at weekend classes or after school. Students attend normal schools during the week. Pre-college departments are available at the Hochschule für Musik Köln, Hochschule für Musik, Theater und Medien Hannover, Hochschule für Musik und Darstellende Kunst Mannheim and the Hochschule für Musik Detmold. The Hoch Conservatory in Frankfurt also has a pre-college department: Pre-College Frankfurt.

== See also ==
- Education in Germany
- Music school
- List of pre-college music schools
- List of university and college schools of music
