= Jean-Baptiste-Louis-Théodore de Tschudi =

French botanist and poet (1734–1784)

Jean-Baptiste-Louis-Théodore de Tschudi also known as Tschoudi or Tschudy (16 August 1734 – 7 March 1784) was a French botanist and poet.

== Career ==
Born in Metz, he wrote the libretto for Gluck's opera Echo et Narcisse and with François-Louis Gand Le Bland Du Roullet co-wrote the libretto for Salieri's Les Danaïdes. He later served as Councillor to the Prince de Liège.

Tschudi contributed many articles on horticulture and natural history to the supplementary volumes of the Encyclopédie. He influenced the views of Jean-Baptiste Lamarck. In a 1790 letter to Charles-Joseph Panckoucke, Lamarck noted that the articles written by Tschudi "contain observations, even in great numbers, which I have used to advantage and which I shall not ignore."

In a 1777 article in the Encyclopédie that influenced Lamarck, he analysed the effect of climate and soil on transplants. According to science historian Richard W. Burkhardt:

Tschoudi observed that a plant's habitude had to be altered gradually if transplantation were to be successful. Organic changes occur, he said, as the result of factors that operate gradually and continually upon supple organs. He did not doubt that such acquired changes could be passed down to succeeding generations. He discussed the production of new varieties through hybridization.

Tschudi in his garden in Colombey planted many exotic plants and published articles and memoirs on agriculture and artificial grassland, the culture of alfalfa, the cultivation of forests and the utility of their planting, on trees and various plants. He wrote botanical articles in the Yverdon Encyclopedia. Tschoudi converted the area around Colombey Castle into a park. He had planted trees from Asia, Africa and America at great expense.

== Publications ==
- 1765: Discours de Mr de Tschoudi, bailli de Metz, à l'assemblée générale des deux religions du louable canton de Glaris où il a demandé le renouvellement de l'ancien droit de citoien de ses ancêtres(sic), (S. l.).
- 1768: De la transplantation, de la naturalisation, et du perfectionnement des végétaux. Londres et Paris.
- 1768: Traité des arbres résineux conifères, impr. de J. Collignon, Metz, 1768
- 1774: L'indigence, ode en stances libres, par M. le baron de Tschoudi, impr. de J. Antoine, Metz, 1774.
- 1775: Les vœux d'un citoyen, ode au Roi, avec un morceau de poésie champêtre, par M. le baron de Tschoudi, impr. de J. Antoine, Metz.
