= Petra Schmidt =

German operatic soprano and academic (born 1963)

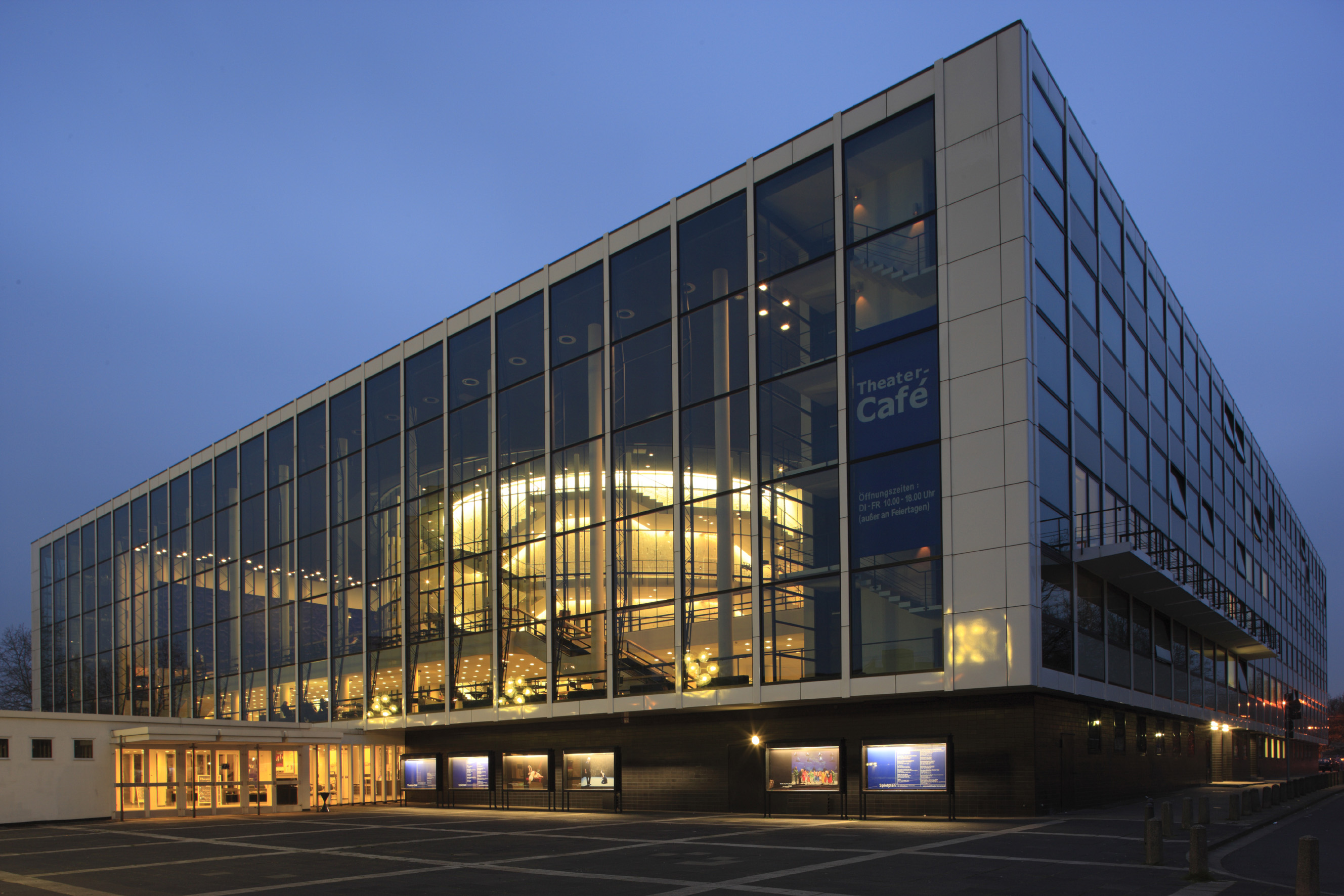
- Musiktheater im Revier in Gelsenkirchen, where the soprano is a member of the ensemble
- Born: 18 March 1963 (age 62); Nordhorn, West Germany
- Occupation: Operatic soprano
- Organizations: Wiener Kammeroper; Staatstheater Kassel; University of Kassel; Musiktheater im Revier

Petra Schmidt (born 18 March 1963) is a German operatic soprano and academic. A member of the Musiktheater im Revier (MiR), she has appeared in title roles such as Dvořák's Rusalka and Ponchielli's La Gioconda. She has also worked as a voice teacher at the Kassel University.

== Career ==
Petra Schmidt was born in Nordhorn, West Germany. She studied music pedagogy at the Musikhochschule Würzburg from 1983 to 1985, and continued her voice studies at the Musikhochschule Detmold from 1987, with Ingeborg Ruß from 1993 to 1996. Her first engagement was at the Wiener Kammeroper at the Schlosstheater Schönbrunn, where she performed in 1996 at the summer festival "Mozart in Schönbrunn", as the First Lady in Mozart's Die Zauberflöte. The same year, she took part in the premiere of Volker Blumenthaler's Jason und Medea at the Staatstheater Nürnberg.

She was a member of the Staatstheater Kassel from 1997 to the 2003/04 season. Her first role there was Wellgunde in Wagner's Das Rheingold. She appeared in leading roles, as Elettra in Mozart's Idomeneo, as Desdemona in Verdi's Otello, as Tatjana in Tchaikovsky's Eugene Onegin, as Micaëla in Bizet's Carmen, as Mimì in Puccini's La bohème and as Rosalinde in Die Fledermaus by Johann Strauss. She also appeared as Ortlinde in Wagner's Die Walküre. From 2005, she was a lecturer for voice and scenic action (Gesang und Szenisches Spiel) at the Kassel University.

Schmidt has been a member of the Musiktheater im Revier in Gelsenkirchen from the 2009/10 season. In Offenbach's Hoffmanns Erzählungen, she appeared as Giulietta. In 2012, she appeared in the title role of Dvořák's Rusalka. In 2016, she performed the title role of Ponchielli's opera La Gioconda, portraying the character as a sensitive woman, with a "steady, sonorous, luminous tone" ("mit stetigem, klanglich erfülltem, leuchtendem Ton"). She performed the role of Madame Lidoine in Poulenc's Dialogues des Carmélites, conducted by Rasmus Baumann.
