= Daniel Beckmann =

German organist at Mainz Cathedral

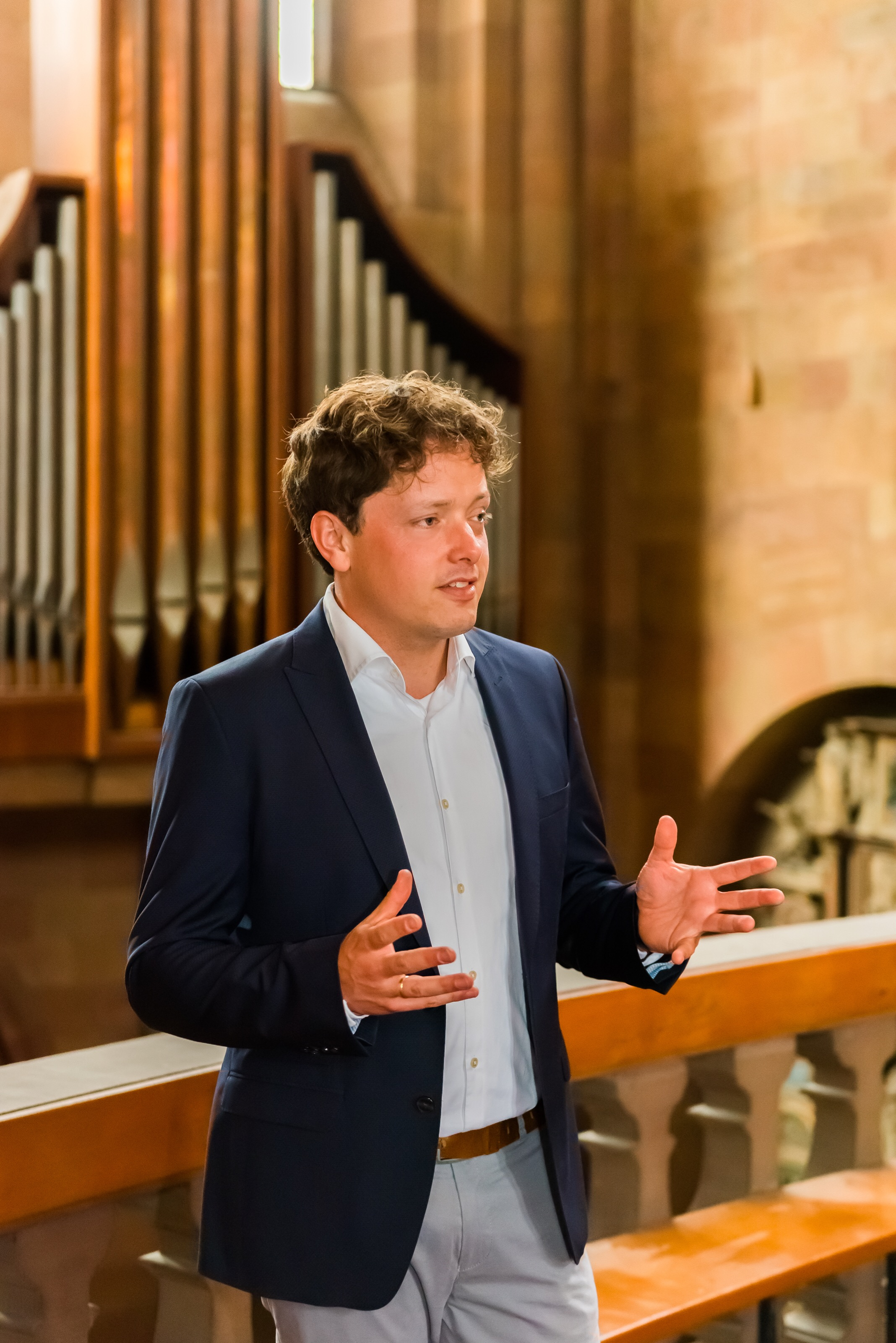
Daniel Beckmann

Daniel Beckmann (born 1980) is a German organist at Mainz Cathedral.

Beckmann studied catholic church music and organ at the Hochschule für Musik Detmold, where he acquired all degrees (church music A, artistic degree and concert degree) with distinction. In 2005 he received a scholarship under the sponsorship of Deutscher Musikrat (German Music Council) and was promoted in the Bundesauswahl Junger Künstler. In 2009 he was awarded the highest award at the International organ contest in Saint-Maurice/Switzerland. From 2006 to 2010 he worked as deanery church musician of the Roman Catholic Archdiocese of Paderborn for the deanery Paderborn. In 2010 he received a call as successor of Albert Schönberger as organist at Mainz Cathedral.
