= Liebe und Eifersucht =

1807 opera by E. T. A. Hoffmann

- Singspiel by E. T. A. Hoffmann
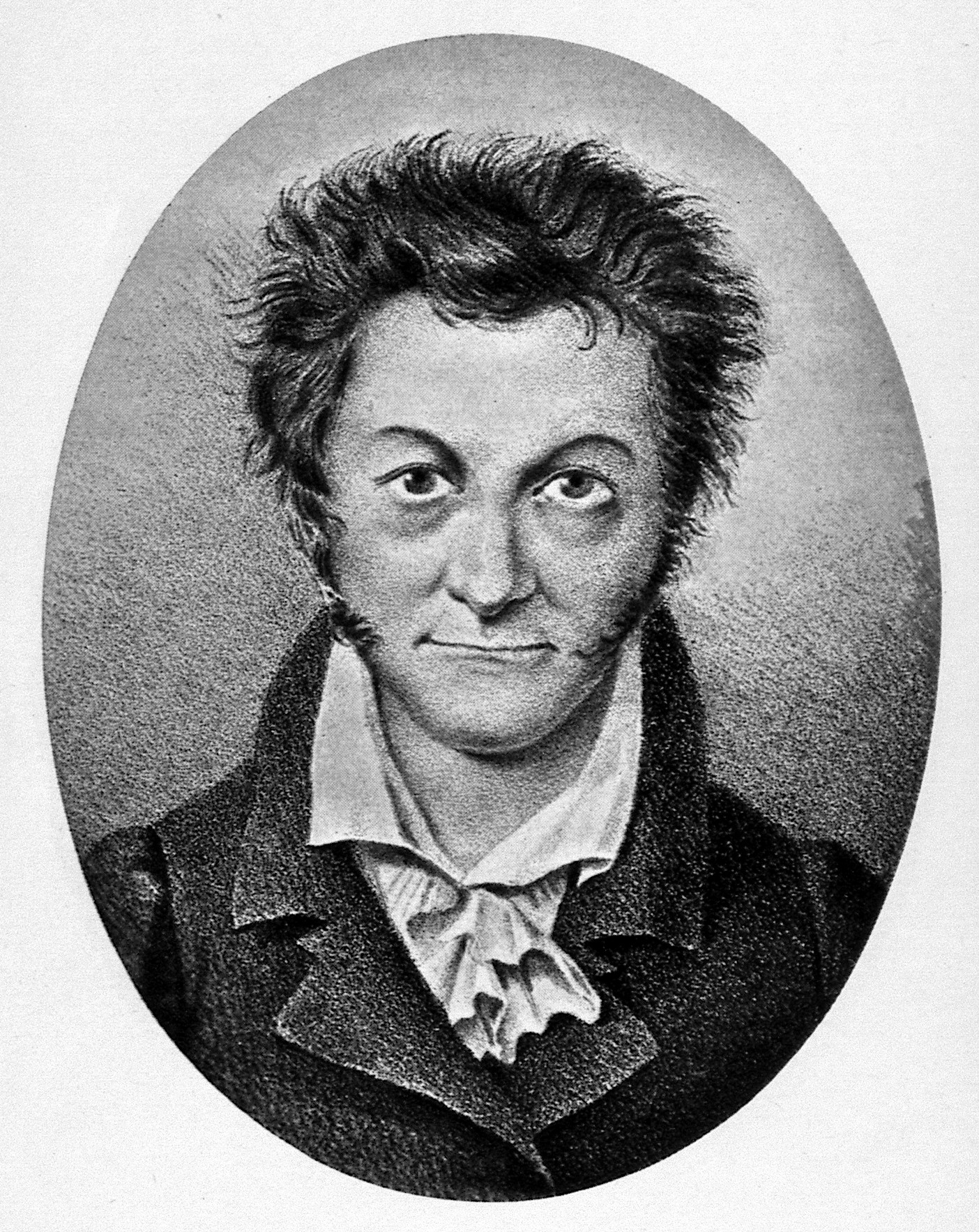
- The composer's self-portrait
- Librettist: Hoffman
- Language: German
- Based on: Calderón's play translated by August Wilhelm Schlegel
- Premiere: 27 November 2008; Ludwigsburger Schlossfestspiele

Liebe und Eifersucht (Love and Jealousy) is a Singspiel, an opera with spoken dialogue, in three acts by the German composer and author E. T. A. Hoffmann, composed in 1807 on his own libretto based on the translation by August Wilhelm Schlegel of a play by Calderón. The opera was first published by Schott in 1999, and premiered at the 2008 Ludwigsburger Schlossfestspiele.

== History ==
The author Ernst Theodor Amadeus Hoffmann was interested in music, wanted originally to become a musician, and added Amadeus to his names in honour of Mozart. He composed one successful opera in 1816, Undine, which became a major influence on the development of German Romantic opera. He wrote his own libretto for the earlier work Liebe und Eifersucht, based on August Wilhelm Schlegel's translation of a play by Pedro Calderón de la Barca, La banda y la flor (The Scarf and the Flower). Hoffmann composed the opera in 1807.

The opera was not performed in Hoffmann's lifetime. It was first published by Schott in 1999. and premiered at the Ludwigsburger Schlossfestspiele on 27 July 2008, at the Forum am Schlosspark in Ludwigsburg, in a coproduction with the Staatstheater am Gärtnerplatz in Munich, where it was first performed on 27 September that year. Michael Hofstetter, who staged a series of revivals of rarely played operas, conducted the Ludwigsburg Festival orchestra and singers from the Gärtnerplatztheater in performances and a recording. The first production in Switzerland was mounted in Zurich in 2016 by the Free Opera Company, with dialogues in more modern German and a reduced orchestra, conducted by Emmanuel Siffert.

== Roles and music ==
The action takes place in Florence.

Roles	Voice type	Premiere cast, 27 July 2008 Conductor: Michael Hofstetter
Duke of Florence	high bass	Gary Martin
Enrico, in the duke's service	tenor	Robert Sellier
Ottavio, in the duke's service	tenor	Florian Simson
Fabio	bass	Jörg Simon
Lisida, daughter of Fabio	soprano	Christina Gerstberger
Chloris, daughter of Fabio	soprano	Thérèse Wincent
Nisa	low soprano	Sybille Specht
Celia, servant	soprano	Sybilla Duffe
Ponlevi, Enrico's servant	bass	Stefan Sevenich
A singer (soprano), musicians, court people

The plot is marked by confusions in relationships, caused partly by disguise and by misunderstanding of signs and tokens of love. The music was described as inspired by Mozart, "everywhere marked by understanding and craftsmanship – and nowhere distinguished by genius."
