= François-Louis Gand Le Bland Du Roullet =

François-Louis Gand Le Bland Du Roullet (10 April 1716 in Normanville – 2 August 1786 in Paris) was a French diplomat and playwright. He is chiefly remembered today as the librettist of Gluck's operas Iphigénie en Aulide and Alceste (1776 French version). He also co-wrote (with Louis-Théodore de Tschudi) the libretto for Salieri's opera Les Danaïdes.
