= Musikhochschule Münster =

Music school in Münster, Germany

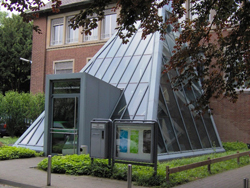
- Motto: human.music
- Type: university of music
- Established: 1972
- Principal: Michael Keller
- Location: Münster, North Rhine-Westphalia, Germany; 51°57′22″N 7°37′37″E
- Website: www.uni-muenster.de/Musikhochschule/

The Musikhochschule Münster (Münster School of Music) founded in 1972, is a university of music, part of the University of Münster, it is one of the five music universities in North Rhine-Westphalia.

The Musikhochschule Münster now comprises 220 students, 15 professors (from Germany, Brazil, Holland and Norway) and 65 part-time instructors. The Symphony Orchestra is the largest ensemble of the Musikhochschule Münster. Past music directors included Joachim Harder, Geoffrey Moull and René Gulikers. The present conductor is Christian Lorenz.

== History ==
From 1972 to 2003 the Musikhochschule Münster was integrated as a campus of the Hochschule für Musik Detmold. In 2004 the Musikhochschule Münster separated from Detmold and on the basis of the revision of the Hochschule law passed on 16 December 2003 became the Faculty of Music of the University of Münster on 1 April 2004.

In 2004, the Musikhochschule Münster was the first music school in Germany to introduce the degree Bachelor of Music. In addition to the bachelor's degree, the Hochschule now offers the degree of Master of Music, the Diploma of Music and the Certificate. As the new degree courses were introduced, the Hochschule benefitted from the long-year cooperation as a department of the Hochschule für Musik Detmold.

== Study ==
The Musikhochschule Münster offers degree programs in music performance, music education, and related disciplines at the undergraduate, graduate, and postgraduate levels. As part of the University of Münster, it operates under the regulations of the state of North Rhine-Westphalia and adheres to the framework of the German higher education system.

=== Undergraduate Programs ===
At the undergraduate level, the Musikhochschule Münster offers:

- Bachelor of Music (B.Mus.) in various performance disciplines, including instrumental and vocal studies
- Bachelor of Music Education (Lehramt Musik) for students preparing to teach music in general education schools

Programs typically combine practical musical training with academic coursework in music theory, musicology, and pedagogy.

=== Graduate Programs ===
Graduate-level offerings include:

- Master of Music (M.Mus.) in areas such as instrumental and vocal performance, composition, and conducting
- Master of Music Education with a focus on pedagogy and educational practice

Master’s programs generally require a relevant bachelor’s degree and successful completion of an entrance examination or audition.

=== Postgraduate Studies ===
The Musikhochschule Münster also offers:

- Konzertexamen (Concert Examination) – a postgraduate artistic degree for highly qualified performers, serving as a pre-professional credential
- Doctoral Studies (Dr. phil.) in collaboration with the Faculty of Musicology at the University of Münster, focusing on music research

=== Youth Academy ===
The institution cooperates with the Westphalian School of Music to operate a Youth Academy, offering pre-college instruction to musically talented children and adolescents.

=== Admission ===
Admission to most programs requires:

- A general university entrance qualification (Abitur or equivalent)
- A successful entrance examination assessing musical aptitude and theoretical knowledge
- For teaching programs, additional educational prerequisites may apply

Instruction is primarily conducted in German.

== Events ==
The Musikhochschule Münster organizes a variety of public events each academic year, including concerts, recitals, and festivals. These events involve participation from students, faculty members, and guest performers and take place primarily at the school’s concert venue on Ludgeriplatz.

Regular event formats include solo and ensemble performances across genres such as classical music, jazz, and popular music. The institution also hosts annual festivals, including mensch.musik.festival, a two-day internal performance series held in the autumn semester.

In addition to on-campus activities, the Musikhochschule is involved in outreach projects such as Neue Sterne für das Münsterland, which facilitates student performances at schools, cultural institutions, and regional venues.

The school also organizes competitions, including the PIANO! Klavierwettbewerb and the International Fürstenau Flute Competition (IFFC).

Event schedules are published in semester brochures and maintained in an online calendar accessible via the official website.

== Notable alumni ==
- Cico Beck, percussionist
- Tilo Beckmann, German singer, coach and arranger
- Mungonzazal Janshindulam, classical pianist
- Suyoen Kim, classical violinist
- Christoph Stegemann, German opera and concert singer
