= Écho et Narcisse =

Opera by Christoph Willibald Gluck

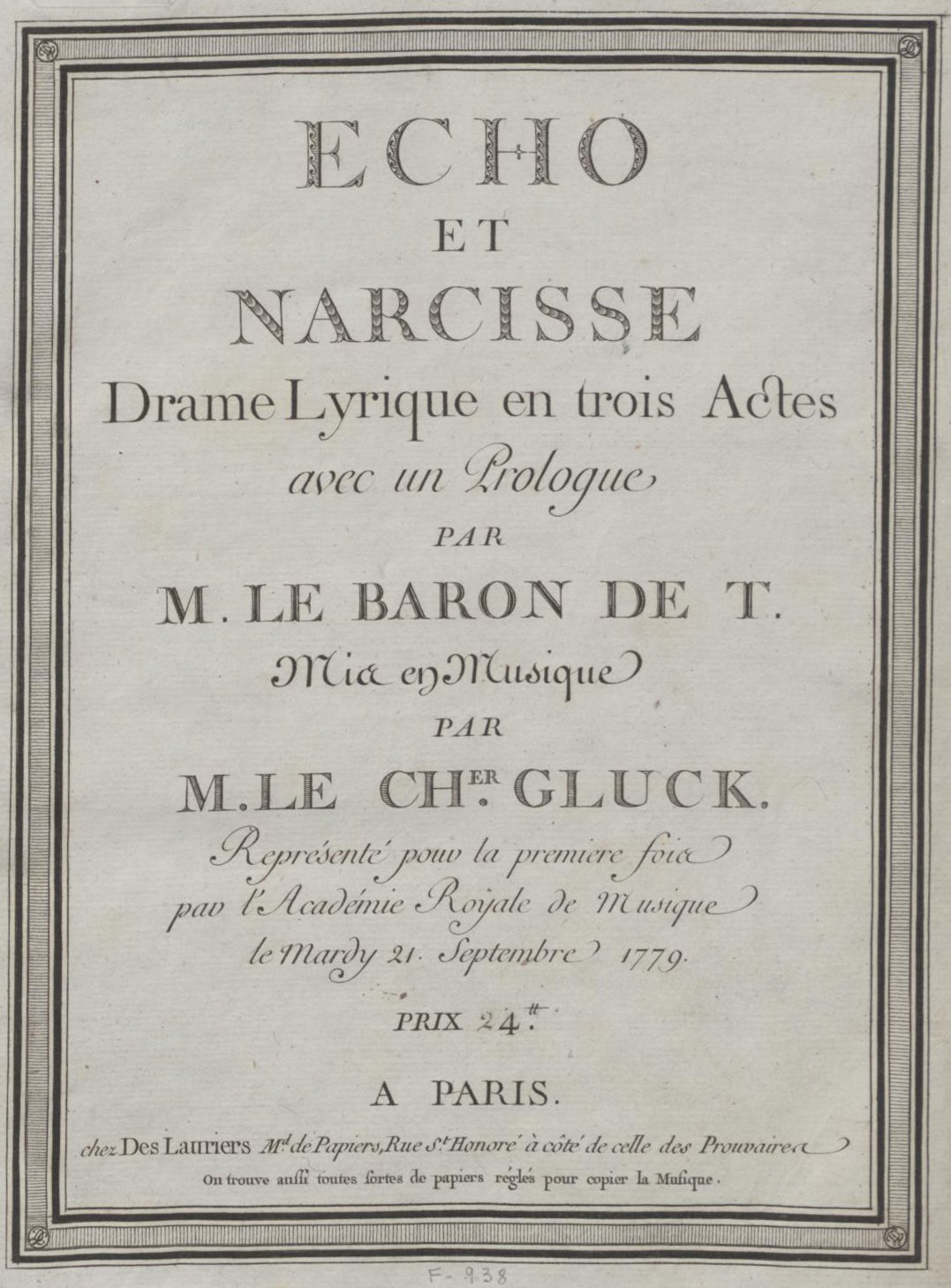
Cover page of a 1779 edition of the opera's score

Écho et Narcisse (Echo and Narcissus) is a 1779 drame lyrique in three acts, the last original opera written by Christoph Willibald Gluck, his sixth for the French stage. The libretto, written by Louis-Théodore de Tschudi, tells the story of the love between Echo and Narcissus.

== Performance history ==
Écho et Narcisse was first performed on 24 September 1779 by the Paris Opéra in the second Salle du Palais-Royal. The opera is in the pastoral tradition, a genre not in favor at the Opéra at the time, and it was a failure, discontinued after only 12 performances. Gluck decided to go back to Vienna and never returned to Paris. He revised the work for 8 August 1780, but this version only enjoyed nine performances.

A third version was presented to the public on 8 June 1781. This was better received. However, it was infrequently produced until René Jacobs revived it in 1987 at the Schwetzingen Festival. Jacobs used the revised version as the original one has not survived, except for the libretto.

== Roles ==
Roles, voice types, premiere cast
Role	Voice type	Premiere cast, 24 September 1779
Écho, a nymph, ruler of the woods and waters	soprano	Mlle Beaumesnil
Aglaé, a nymph, friend of Écho	soprano	Adelaïde Gavaudan 'cadette'
Eglé, a nymph, friend of Écho	soprano	Anne-Marie-Jeanne Gavaudan, 'L'aînée'
Amour (Cupid)	soprano	Gertrude Girardin
Narcisse, a hunter, son of Cephisus	haute-contre	Étienne Lainez
Cynire, friend of Narcisse	haute-contre	Joseph Legros
Sylphie, a nymph	soprano	
Thanais, a nymph	soprano	
Two sylvans	bass haute-contre	Auguste-Athanase (Augustin) Chéron; Jean-Joseph Rousseau
Sylphs, Zephyrs and attendants and followers of Amour, Écho and Narcisse.
Ballet – ballerinas: Marie-Madeleine Guimard, Anne Heinel, Marie Allard, Peslin; male dancers: Gaetano Vestris, Auguste Vestris, Maximilien Gardel, Jean D'Auberval

== Synopsis ==
The nymph Écho is loved by Narcisse, but also desired by Apollo. Apollo puts a spell on Narcisse so he falls in love with his own reflection, but Cupid is eventually successful in securing a happy ending by re-uniting Écho and Narcisse.
