= Gerigk =

Gerigk is a German surname. Notable people with the surname include:

- Herbert Gerigk (1905–1996), German musicologist
- Patrick Gerigk (born 1972), American football wide receiver

== See also ==
- The dictionary definition of Gerigk at Wiktionary
