= Hochschule für Musik Detmold =

Music school in Detmold, Germany

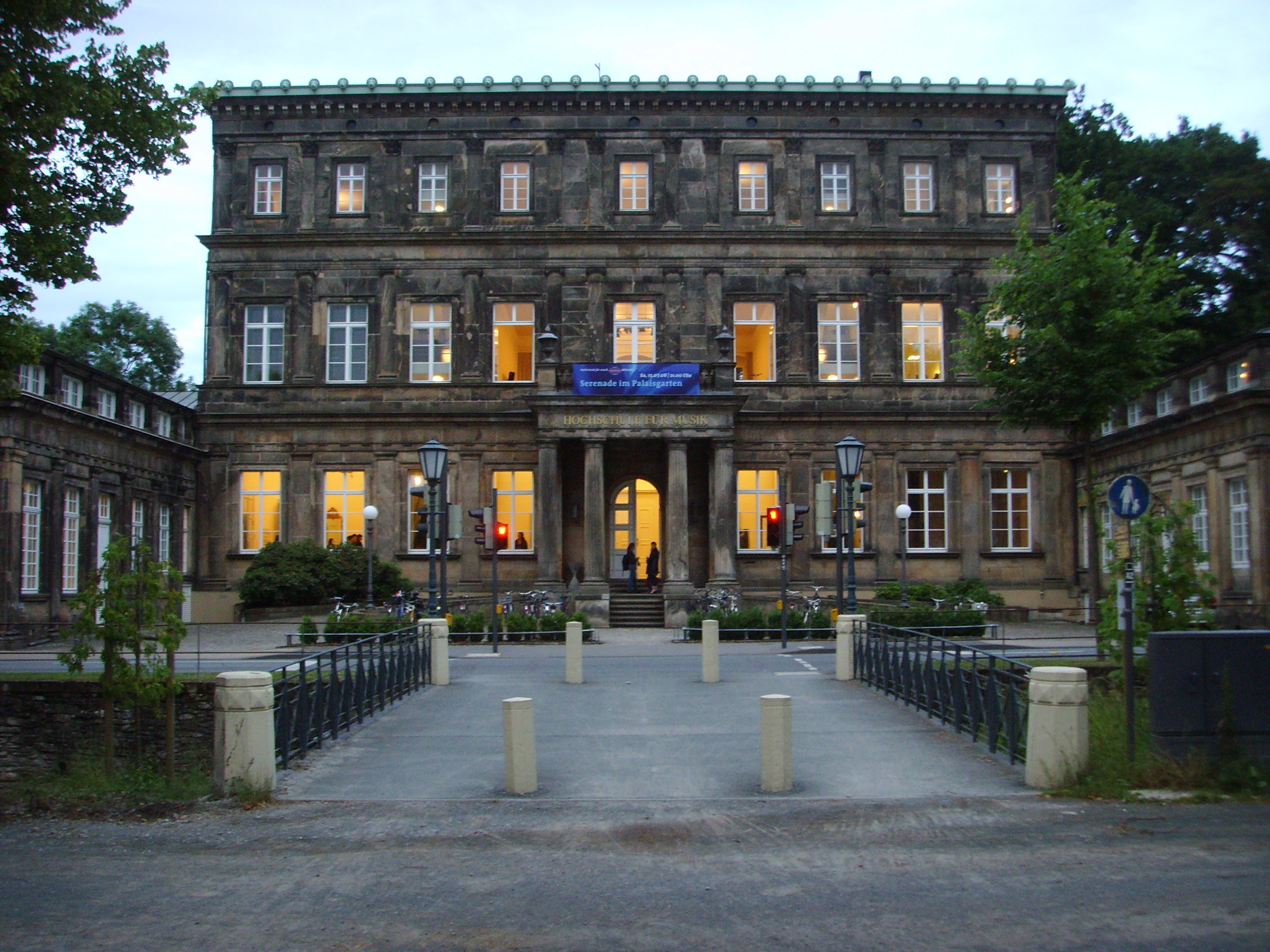
Main building, 2008

The Hochschule für Musik Detmold is a university-level music school situated in Detmold, North Rhine–Westphalia, Germany.

== Academics ==
The Hochschule offers performance degrees in composition, all orchestral instruments, piano, voice, opera, art-song and conducting, as well as degrees in church music and music education. Artistic Music Production (Musik-Tonmeister) is also offered at the Erich Thienhaus Institute.

== Structure ==
In 2007 there were 594 students matriculated, plus an additional 22 junior students. The Hochschule offers about 300 concerts per year. Professor Godelieve Schrama serves as rector of the Hochschule from 2026. Hans Bertels was appointed chancellor in May 2007. In December 2006 the Hochschule für Music Detmold Foundation was formed to help finance extraordinary activities. An alumni association was founded in October 2006; its present chairman is Prof. Martin Christoph Redel.

== History ==
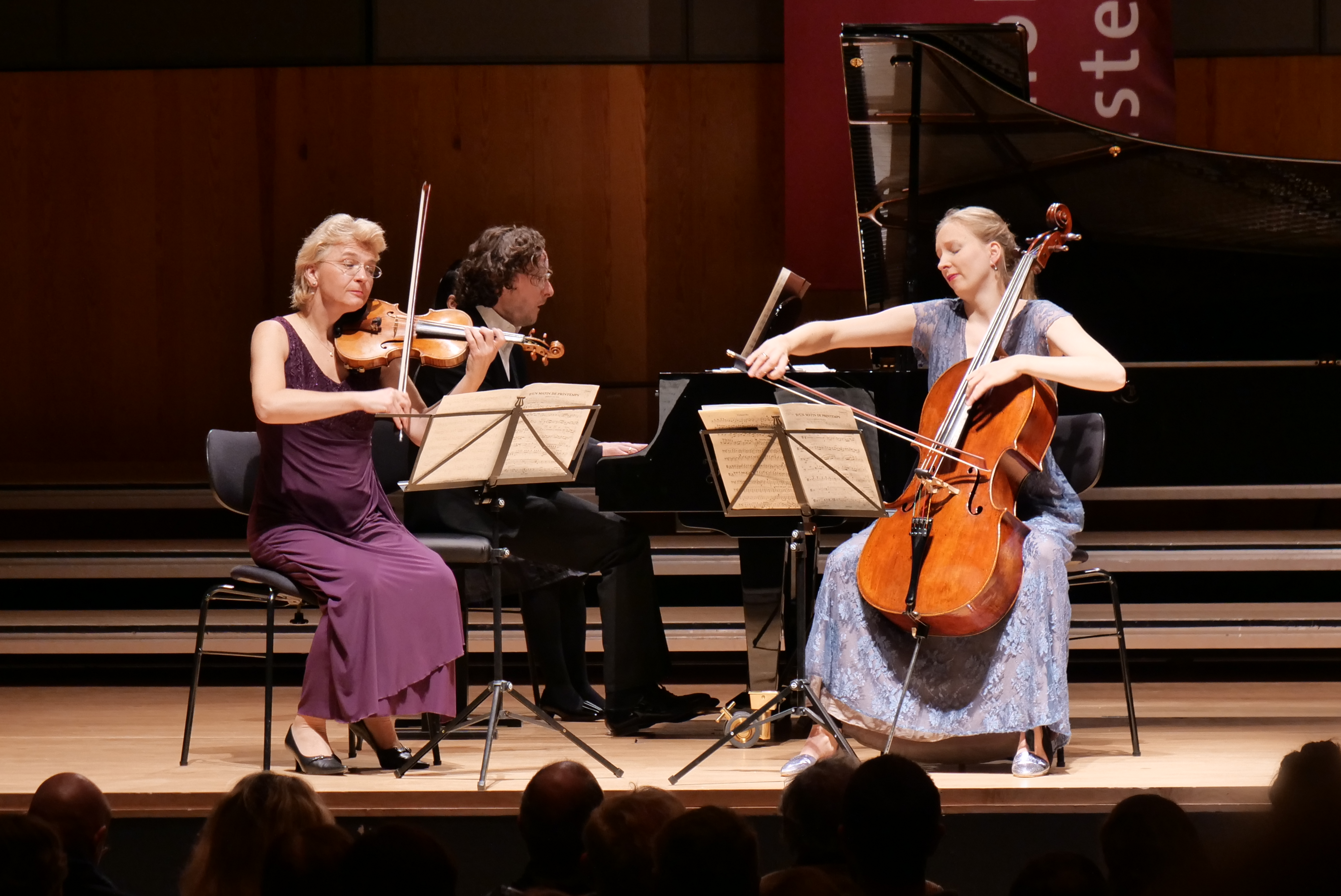
Antje Weithaas, Martin Helmchen, Marie-Elisabeth Hecker, 2019 chamber concert in 2019 at the Hochschule für Musik Detmold

After initial planning that started in 1944, the Hochschule was founded in 1946 as Nordwestdeutsche Musikakademie Detmold. In 1956 the name was officially expanded to Nordwestdeutsche Musikakademie Detmold, Staatliche Hochschule für Musik. After the Hochschule in Münster and Dortmund were officially merged with the Detmold Hochschule, the name was changed again in 1972 to Staatliche Hochschule für Musik Westfalen-Lippe. Nordwestdeutsche Musikakademie Detmold, with campuses in Münster and Dortmund. In 1987 the present name was given: Hochschule für Musik Detmold. In 2003, the Münster campus separated and became the Musikhochschule Münster and part of the Westfälische Wilhelms-Universität Münster. The Dortmund campus was closed in 2004.

The first director was Wilhelm Maler from 1946 to 1959. The second director was Martin Stephani from 1959 to 1982, the longest tenure in that position. Stephani was also professor of conducting and conductor of the Hochschule's orchestra.

== Campus ==
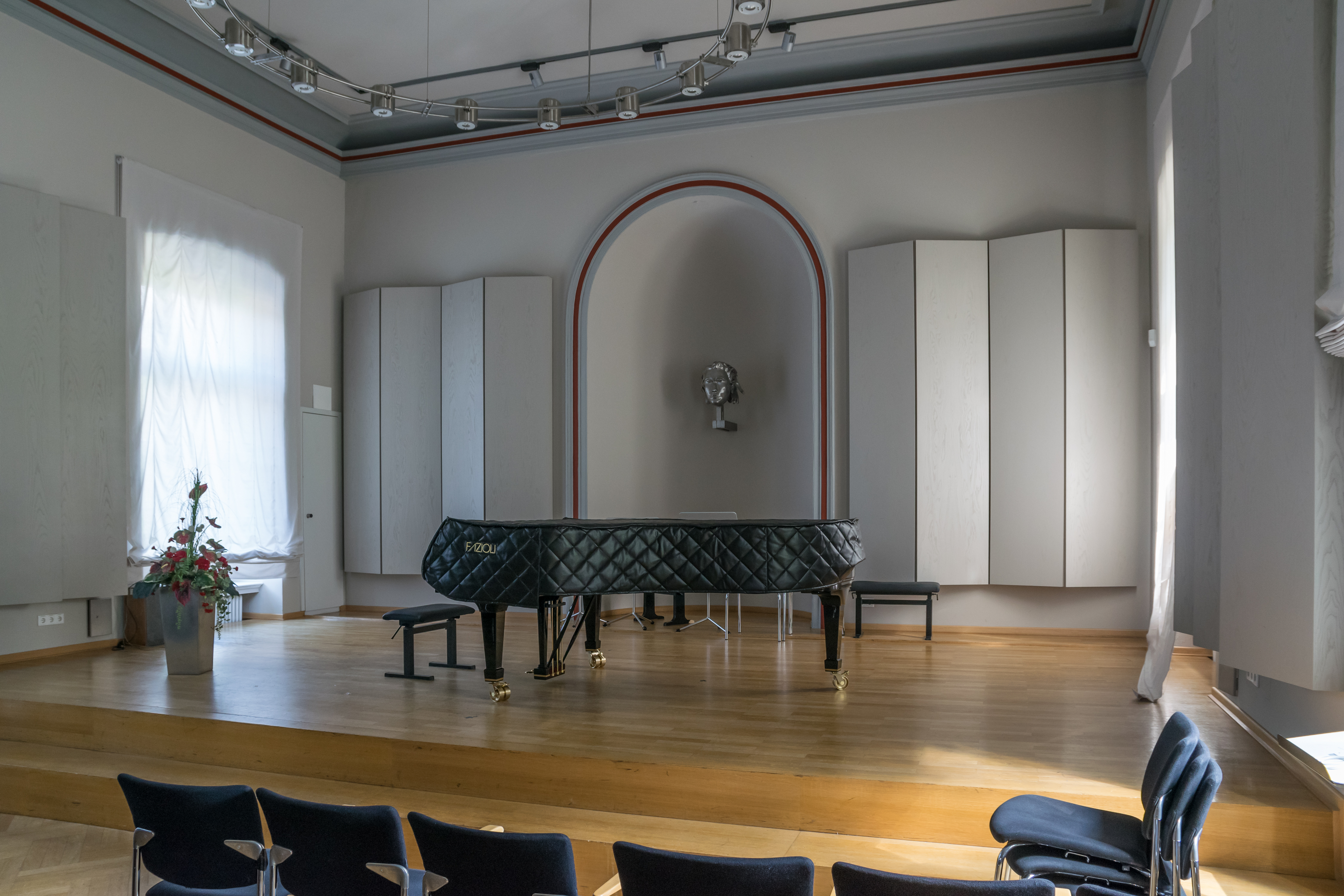
Brahms Recital Hall

The Hochschule has ten specifically equipped buildings at its disposal, which are arranged as a campus in and around the gardens of the Neues Palais: string-players, wind instruments, singers and percussionists have their own buildings; pianists and organists reside in the historic palace, where rehearsals and concerts for larger chamber music groups also take place. The musicologists work in an Art Nouveau building at the outskirts of the gardens, and music-education students and future music teachers hold their academic seminars in the technically equipped Pädagogikhaus.

Also at the fringe of the campus, opera students may use the historic Sommertheater to gain concert experience and the taste of a fully staged opera performance. The Erich Thienhaus Institute is built directly onto the large concert hall. The concert hall is equipped with a unique spatial audio rendering technique (Wave Field Synthesis). About 180 artists and teachers as well as the many national and international partners work at the Hochschule. Students from Detmold are very often found among prizewinners in competitions. They are represented not only in the contemporary classical music scene in all important opera houses and orchestras, but also work worldwide in prominent positions as teachers in universities, academies and music schools.

== Notable alumni ==
- María Bayo
- Daniel Beckmann
- Frank Beermann
- Christina Brabetz
- Ingeborg Danz
- Christina Gerstberger
- Sabine Grofmeier
- Sébastien Hurtaud
- Mungonzazal Janshindulam
- Dirk Kaftan
- Volker David Kirchner
- Matthias Kirschnereit
- Sándor Kónya
- Helmut Kretschmar
- Diether de la Motte
- Geoffrey Moull
- Marita Napier
- Petra Schmidt
- Vera Schwarz
- Klaus Storck
- Alexander Wagner
- Cornelia Wulkopf
- Karlheinz Zöller

== Notable faculty ==
- Günter Bialas
- Georg Christoph Biller
- Johannes Driessler
- Wolfgang Fortner
- Werner Genuit
- Nobuko Imai
- Conrad Hansen
- Koh Gabriel Kameda
- Rudolf Kelterborn
- Giselher Klebe
- Richard Rudolf Klein
- Dieter Klöcker
- Helmut Kretschmar
- Fabien Lévy
- André Navarra
- Christoph Poppen
- Roland Pröll
- Thomas Quasthoff
- Kurt Redel
- Hans Richter-Haaser
- Kurt Thomas
- Elina Vähälä
- Tibor Varga
- Alexander Wagner
- Günther Weißenborn
- Helmut Winschermann

== International relations ==
The Hochschule für Musik Detmold partners with the following institutions:

- University of Sydney (Australia)
- Pontifical Catholic University of Chile
- Sibelius Academy Helsinki (Finland)
- Pirkanmaa Polytechnic School of Music, Tampere (Finland)
- Conservatoire de Paris (France)
- Hogeschool voor de Kunsten Utrecht (Netherlands)
- Hogeschool voor Muziek en Dans in Rotterdam (Netherlands)
- Koninklijk Conservatorium Den Haag (Netherlands)
- Conservatorium van Amsterdam (Netherlands)
- Erasmus Hogeschool Brussel (Belgium)
- Universität für Musik und Darstellende Kunst in Wien (Austria)
- Akademia Muzyczna Kraków (Poland)
- Jan Długosz University Czᶒstochowa (Poland)
- Royal College of Music, Stockholm (Sweden)
- Academy of Music and Dramatic Arts in Bratislava (Slowakia)
- University of Ljubljana (Academy of Music) (Slovenia)
- Real Conservatorio Superior de Música de Madrid (Spain)
- Conservatorio Superior de Música de Salamanca (Spain)
- Academy of Performing Arts in Prague (Czech Republic)
- Academy of Music, Łódź (Poland)
- Liszt Ferenc Zeneművészeti Egyetem Budapest (Hungary)
- Karol Lipinski Academy of Music Wrocław (Poland)
- Taipei National University of the Arts (Taiwan)

== See also ==
- Music schools in Germany
