= Michael Hofstetter =

German conductor and academic (born 1961)

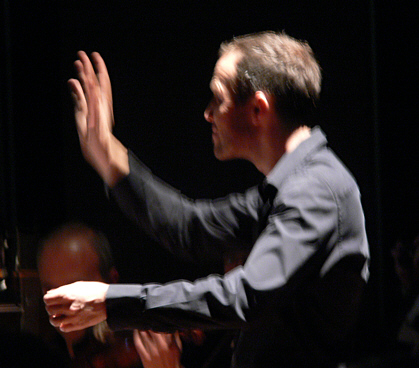
- Michael Hofstetter conducting, November 2008
- Born: 6 September 1961 (age 65); Munich, Bavaria, West Germany
- Occupations: Conductor; Academic
- Organizations: Ludwigsburger Schlossfestspiele; Stuttgarter Kammerorchester; Theater Gießen; Hochschule für Musik Mainz
- Website: www.michaelhofstetter.com

Michael Hofstetter (born 6 September 1961) is a German conductor and academic. He was chief conductor of the festival Ludwigsburger Schlossfestspiele from 2005 to 2012, and has been Generalmusikdirektor of Gießen since. He has worked internationally at notable opera houses and festivals. He is regarded as an expert of historically informed performance, who has rediscovered and recorded rarely performed operas.

== Career ==
Born in Munich, Hofstetter studied organ, piano and conducting at the Richard Strauss Conservatory in his hometown. He worked as Kapellmeister at the Staatstheater Wiesbaden. He was the chief conductor of the festival Ludwigsburger Schlossfestspiele from 2005 to 2012, where he performed and recorded rarely played operas, including Salieri's opera Les Danaïdes in 2006, and in 2008 the premiere of E. T. A. Hoffmann's Liebe und Eifersucht which was never performed in the composer's lifetime. He performed there Verdi's Il trovatore in a 2011 production with period instruments. A review noted that "Michael Hofstetter's well-chosen tempos, elegant yet unfussy phrasing, and precise control of dynamics propel the opera with real excitement". From 2006 to 2012, he was chief conductor of the Stuttgarter Kammerorchester, conducting premieres of works by Moritz Eggert and Helmut Oehring. Beginning in 2012, he has been Generalmusikdirektor at the Theater Gießen. He was also from 2012 to 2017 chief conductor of the orchestra recreation - Großes Orchester Graz.

Hofstetter was professor of orchestral conducting and Early Music at the Hochschule für Musik Mainz. He is regarded as an expert for historically informed performance. He has performed internationally at opera houses such as Hamburgische Staatsoper, Bavarian State Opera, Staatsoper Stuttgart, Deutsche Oper Berlin, Staatsoper Hannover, Gran Teatre del Liceu in Barcelona, and the Canadian Opera Company in Toronto, and at festivals including styriarte in Graz the Salzburg Festival.

He has regularly worked at the Handel Festival Karlsruhe from 1999, including Partenope in 2011. At the Houston Grand Opera, he conducted a production of Béatrice et Bénédict by Berlioz in 2008, and Beethoven's Fidelio in 2012. He conducted Mozart's Le nozze di Figaro at the Welsh National Opera in Cardiff in 2009, and Verdi's La traviata at the English National Opera in London in 2013, staged by Peter Konwitschny.

Hofstetter was nominated as Conductor of the Year several times, for Wagner's Tristan und Isolde at the Opernhaus Dortmund in 2000, for Hasse's Didone abbandonata at the Prinzregententheater in Munich in 2011, and in 2013 for his work as GMD in Gießen, which included Handel's Agrippina and Weber's Der Freischütz.

== Awards ==
- Robert-Stolz-Medaille (Gold)
- Horst-Stein-Preis

== Literature ==
- Michael Hofstetter: Das Historische hört nie auf. Quellen und Akteure in der historisch informierten Aufführungspraxis. In: Susanne Rode-Breymann u. Sven Limbeck (Hrsg.): Verklingend und ewig. Tausend Jahre Musikgedächtnis 800–1800. Herzog August Bibliothek, Wolfenbüttel 2011, ISBN 978-3-44706596-2.
- Eckhard Roelcke: Der Taktstock. Dirigenten erzählen von ihrem Instrument. Zsolnay, Wien 2000, ISBN 3-552-04985-1.
- Julia Spinola: Die großen Dirigenten unserer Zeit. Henschel, Berlin 2005, ISBN 3-89487-480-5.
