= Ludwigsburg Festival =

German culture festival

Ludwigsburger Schlossfestspiele Ludwigsburg Festival
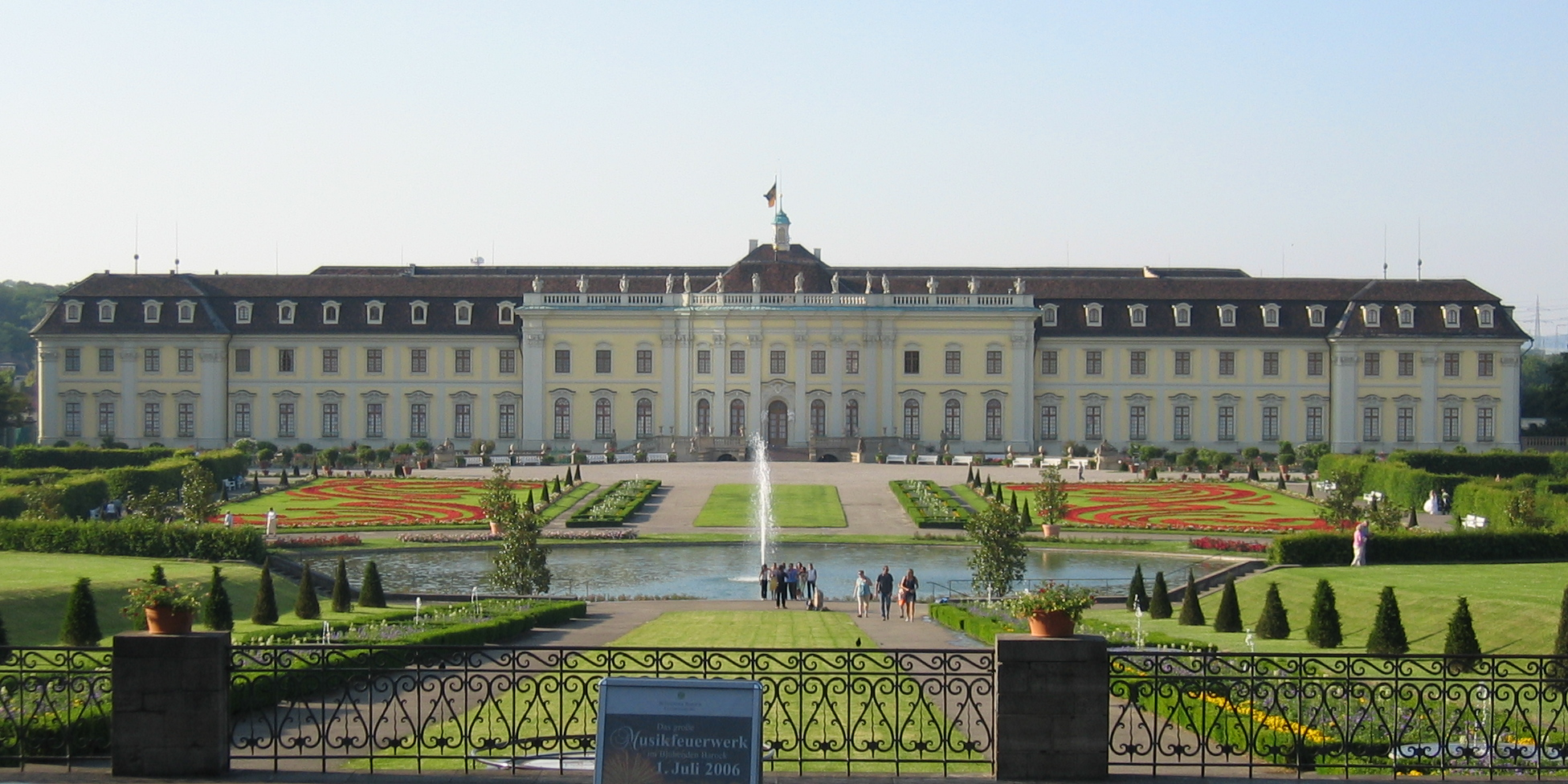
- Schloss Ludwigsburg, venue of events
- Genre: mostly music
- Begins: May
- Ends: July
- Frequency: annual
- Inaugurated: 1932; 94 years ago
- Participants: 100 events
- People: Wolfgang Gönnenwein; Michael Hofstetter; Thomas Wördehoff
- Website: www.schlossfestspiele.de/en/index.htm

The Ludwigsburg Festival (Ludwigsburger Schlossfestspiele, also Internationale Festspiele Baden-Württemberg) is a culture festival with programs in music, dance, theatre and literature. The festival is held in Ludwigsburg annually between May and July. Founded in 1932, the festival is among the oldest festivals in German-speaking countries. Many events are held at the Ludwigsburg Palace.

== History ==
Wilhelm Krämer founded the Ludwigsburger Mozartgemeinde in 1931 and a year later began chamber music concerts at the palace. Wolfgang Gönnenwein, who was the artistic director from 1972 to 2004, developed the festival into an event of three months with around 100 events. The state of Baden-Württemberg made the festival a state event with a new official name in 1980. From 2005 to 2009 it was directed by Wulf Konold and the conductor Michael Hofstetter, who initiated a series of rarely performed operas, including the premiere of E. T. A. Hoffmann's 1807 singspiel Liebe und Eifersucht in 2008. Thomas Wördehoff has been director since 2009.
